= Thought of Norea =

Sethian Gnostic text

The Thought of Norea is a Sethian Gnostic text. It is the second of three treatises in Codex IX of the Nag Hammadi library texts, taking up pages 27–29 of the codex's 74 pages. The text consists of only 52 lines, making it one of the shortest treatises in the entire library. The work is untitled; editor Birger A. Pearson created the title from the phrase "the thought of Norea" (Sahidic Coptic: ⲦⲚⲞⲎⲤⲒⲤ Ⲛ̅ⲚⲞⲢⲈⲀ) that appears in the final sentence of the text. The text expands Norea's plea for deliverance from the archons in Hypostasis of the Archons. It is divided into four parts: an invocation, Norea's cry and deliverance, her activity in the Pleroma, and salvation.

== History and Composition ==
The text was discovered in Nag Hammadi, Egypt in 1945 as one of the 51 total treatises transcribed into the 13 codices that make up the Nag Hammadi library. The codices had been buried around 400 AD. The authorship of the original text is estimated to the late second century or early third century. The text gives no indication of its author.

The writing is a Coptic translation of a Greek original. The Coptic manuscript contains grammatical mistakes such as incorrectly conjugated verbs, and at one point misspells Norea's name as ⲛⲟⲣⲉⲁ instead of ⲛⲱⲣⲉⲁ. The text is only 52 lines long, and appears to be self contained rather than an excerpt of a longer work. The manuscript is untitled, although the phrase "thought of Norea" appears in the body of the text. Birger Pearson describes its genre as a "prose hymn".

Along with the rest of the works in the Nag Hammadi library, the text was translated into English and published in The Nag Hammadi Library in English in 1977. The publication was part of the work of the Coptic Gnostic Library Project, which began in 1966 at Claremont Graduate University.

== Summary ==
The brief text consists of four sections: An invocation of the Father of All, Norea's cry for help and subsequent rescue, a description of her in the Pleroma, and a prophecy of salvation for Norea and her children.

Norea calls out to Father of All, Ennoia of the Light, who dwells in the heights. Her cry is heard and she is welcomed eternally. She is given a place in the Father of Nous, Adamas, and the voice of the Holy Ones. She rests in the indescribable Epinoia and inherits the first mind she received. She rests in the divine Autogenes and generates herself. She possesses the living Logos and joins the Imperishable Ones, speaking with the mind of the Father. She speaks words of Life and stays in the presence of the Exalted One, having what she received before the world existed. She has the great mind of the Invisible One, glorifying her Father, dwelling within those in the Pleroma, and she beholds the Pleroma. There will be days when she sees the Pleroma completely, supported by the four holy helpers who intercede for her with the Father of the All, Adamas. Adamas possesses Norea's thought, is within all Adams, and talks about the two names that create a single name.

== Analysis ==
Professor John D. Turner writes that Norea appears in the Thought of Norea as a manifestation of the fallen Sophia. According to the cosmic narrative outlined in the Apocryphon of John, Sophia (Wisdom) is an aeon of the Pleroma (fullness of the divine). Sophia fell when she independently used her productive power without approval from the Spirit nor from her masculine counterpart. Her malformed offspring Yaldabaoth, existing outside the Pleroma, created the material world as a poor imitation of the divine. The ensuing repentance and restoration of Sophia is equivalent to Norea's precosmic restoration to the Pleroma.

The text presents Norea as a "saved savior" whose salvation is not yet complete. She prophesies about "two names which create a single name", representing an eventual integration of humanity and the divine. Birger Pearson and Søren Giversen speculate that the two names in question are either Adamas and Norea or Adamas and Adam.

=== Relationship to Sethianism ===
The Thought of Norea is one of at least 11 texts in the Nag Hammadi library classified by Professor Hans-Martin Schenke as Sethian, which is a system that is primarily characterized by Gnostic self-identification as the spiritual seed of Seth. The term 'Sethian' comes from ancient antiheretical writers Irenaeus, Epiphanius of Salamis, and Pseudo-Tertullian. Schenke's Sethian classification requires the text to have multiple Sethian features; the Thought of Norea's Sethian features are "the divine Autogenes" and "the four holy helpers." Although Seth does not appear in the text, Norea is utilized as his female equivalent.

The text shares features with other Sethian treatises. Norea demonstrates belief in the heavenly trinity of the Father (Invisible Spirit), Mother (Ennoia), and Son (Autogenes), like Sethian works such as the Apocryphon of John, Trimorphic Protennoia, and Zostrianos. All Sethian works combine Jewish traditions with Platonic doctrines, but some, such as Norea, Three Steles of Seth, and Marsanes, lack clear Christian features. A common thematic element in Sethian works is a descent or ascent component; Norea employs the descent pattern.

Unlike other Sethian texts, the Thought of Norea does not contain any distinctive Jewish or Christian elements. However, the text may have been influenced by Valentinianism, as it uses Valentinian terminology like Pleroma and Nous (the son of the divine triad).

=== Connection to Hypostasis of the Archons ===
Researcher Sergey Minov notes that the Thought of Norea is closely related to Hypostasis of the Archons. In Hypostasis, Norea is the daughter of Eve. The archons attempt to seduce her, leading her to plea to the God of all for help, and she receives aid from the angel Eleleth. In the Thought of Norea, she directs her plea to the divine triad (including the Father of All) and receives help from the Four Luminaries.

The Thought of Norea assumes its audience is already familiar with the story of Norea's cry and rescue. However, while Hypostasis treats Norea and Sophia as distinct entities, Thought assigns Sophia's symbolism to Norea as well. Norea's cry for help also recalls elements of the Pistis Sophia.

It is not clear whether the Thought of Norea directly depends on Hypostasis. The two works do not share similar language, but may have independently derived from an earlier source.

== Sources ==
- Pearson, Birger A.; Giversen, Søren (1981). NHC IX, 2: The Thought of Norea. Brill. ISBN 978-90-04-43887-3.
- Turner, John Douglas (2001). Sethian Gnosticism and the Platonic Tradition (2 ed.). Paris: Presses Université Laval. ISBN 978-2-7637-7834-1.
