= Gnosticism and Neoplatonism =

While Gnosticism was influenced by Middle Platonism, neoplatonists from the third century onward rejected Gnosticism. Nevertheless, Alexander J. Mazur argues that many neoplatonic concepts and ideas are ultimately derived from Sethian Gnosticism during the third century in Lower Egypt, and that Plotinus, the founder of neoplatonism, himself may have been a Gnostic before nominally distancing himself from the movement.

== Gnosticism ==
Gnosticism originated in the late first century AD in nonrabbinical Jewish sects and early Christian sects, and many of the Nag Hammadi texts make reference to Judaism, in some cases with a violent rejection of the Jewish God.

Sethianism may have started as a pre-Christian tradition, possibly a syncretic Hebrew Mediterranean baptismal movement from the Jordan Valley, with Babylonian and Egyptian pagan elements, and elements from Hellenic philosophy. Both Sethian Gnostics and the Valentinian Gnostics incorporated elements of Christianity and Hellenic philosophy as it grew, including elements from Plato, middle Platonism and Neo-Pythagoreanism.

Earlier Sethian texts such as Apocalypse of Adam show signs of being pre-Christian and focus on the Seth of the Jewish Bible. (Note: Not the Egyptian God Set who is sometimes called Seth in Greek.) Later Sethian texts are continuing to interact with Platonism, and texts such as Zostrianos and Allogenes draw on the imagery of older Sethian texts, but utilize "a large fund of philosophical conceptuality derived from contemporary Platonism, (that is late middle Platonism) with no traces of Christian content."

Scholarship on Gnosticism has been greatly advanced by the discovery and translation of the Nag Hammadi texts, which shed light on some of the more puzzling comments by Plotinus and Porphyry regarding the Gnostics. It now seems clear that "Sethian" and "Valentinian" gnostics attempted "an effort towards conciliation, even affiliation" with late antique philosophy.

== Platonism ==
By the third century, Plotinus had shifted Platonist thought far enough that modern scholars consider the period a new movement called "neoplatonism".

== Philosophical relations ==
Gnostics structured their world of transcendent being by ontological distinctions. The plenitude of the divine world emerges from a sole high deity by emanation, radiation, unfolding, and mental self-reflection. The technique of self-performable contemplative mystical ascent towards and beyond a realm of pure being, which is rooted in Plato's Symposium and was common in Gnostic thought, was also expressed by Plotinus. (Note: See Life of Plotinus)

Divine triads, tetrads, and ogdoads in Gnostic thought often are closely related to Neopythagorean arithmology. The trinity of the "triple-powered one" (with the powers consisting of the modalities of existence, life, and mind) in Allogenes mirrors quite closely the neoplatonic doctrine of the Intellect differentiating itself from the One in three phases, called Existence or reality (hypostasis), Life, and Intellect (nous). Both traditions heavily emphasize the role of negative theology or apophasis, and Gnostic emphasis on the ineffability of God often echoes Platonic (and neoplatonic) formulations of the ineffability of the One or the Good.

There were some important philosophical differences. Gnostics emphasized magic and ritual in a way that would have been disagreeable to the more sober neoplatonists such as Plotinus and Porphyry, though perhaps not to later neoplatonists such as Iamblichus. Gnostics were in conflict with the idea expressed by Plotinus that the approach to the infinite force, which is the One or Monad, cannot be through knowing or not knowing. Although there has been dispute as to which gnostics Plotinus was referring to, it appears they were Sethian.

== Neoplatonist objections ==
In the third century CE, both Christianity and neoplatonism reject and turn against Gnosticism, with neoplatonists as Plotinus, Porphyry and Amelius attacking the Sethians. John D. Turner believes that this double attack led Sethianism to fragment into numerous smaller groups (Audians, Borborites, Archontics and perhaps Phibionites, Stratiotici, and Secundians).

Plotinus' objections seem applicable to some of the Nag Hammadi texts, although others such as the Valentinians, or the Tripartite Tractate, appear to insist on the goodness of the world and the Demiurge. In particular, Plotinus seems to direct his attacks at a very specific sect of Gnostics, most notably a sect that held anti-polytheistic and anti-daemon views, expressed anti-Greek sentiments, believed magic was a cure for diseases, and preached salvation was possible without struggle. Certainly, the aforementioned points are not part of any scholarly definition of Gnosticism, and might have been unique to the sect Plotinus had interacted with.

Plotinus raises objections to several core tenets of Gnosticism, although some of them might have come from misunderstandings: Plotinus states that he did not have the opportunity to see the Gnostics explain their teachings in a considerate and philosophical manner. Indeed, it seems most of his conceptions of Gnosticism had come from foreign preachers that he perceived as harboring resentment against his homeland. Nonetheless, the major differences between Plotinus and Gnostics can be summarized as follows:

1. Plotinus felt Gnostics were trying to cut in line in what he considered a natural hierarchy of ascension, whereas Gnostics considered they had to step aside from the material realm in order to start ascending in the first place. Like Aristotle, Plotinus believed the hierarchy to be observable in the celestial bodies, which he considered as conscious beings above the rank of humans.
2. Plotinus thought that the observable universe is the consequence of timeless divine activity and therefore eternal, whereas the Gnostics believed the material realm to be the result of the fall of a divine principle called Sophia (Wisdom) and her offspring, the Demiurge. Because Sophia must have undergone a change when turning her attention away from the divine realm, the Gnostics (according to Plotinus) must think that the world was created in time.
3. Plotinus considered that human souls must be new compared to the beings inhabiting the celestial plane, and thus must have been born from the observable cosmos, whereas Gnostics considered that at least a part of the human soul must have come from the celestial plane, either falling due to ignorance or purposefully descending to illuminate the lower plane, thus originating the longing to ascend. Consequently, Plotinus implied that such pretensions were arrogant.
4. Plotinus felt that, although admittedly not the ideal existence for a soul, experiencing the cosmos was absolutely necessary in order to ascend, whereas Gnostics considered the material realm as merely a distraction.
5. Plotinus considered that no evil entity could possibly arise from the celestial plane such as the Demiurge as described by some Gnostics, whereas some Gnostics indeed believed the Demiurge to be evil. However, some other Gnostics believed it to be simply ignorant, and some others even believed it to be good, placing the blame on themselves for depending on it.
6. Plotinus believed that, should one accept the Gnostic premises, awaiting death would be enough to free oneself of the material plane, whereas Gnostics thought that death without proper preparation would just lead one to reincarnate again or to lose themselves in the winds of the sensible plane. This in part shows that Plotinus did not interpret Gnostic teachings charitably.
7. Plotinus believed that Gnostics should simply think of evil as a deficiency in wisdom, whereas most Gnostics did so already. This highlights another aspect that Plotinus might have misunderstood, perhaps due to his interactions with a particular Gnostic sect that was not representative of Gnosticism as a whole.
8. Plotinus believed that, in order to attain the path of ascension, one needed precise explanations of what virtue entails; whereas Gnostics believed this kind of knowledge could be attained intuitively from one's eternal connection to the Monad.
9. Plotinus argued that trying to establish a relationship with God without celestial intermediaries would be disrespectful to the deities, favored sons of God, whereas Gnostics believed that they too were the sons of God, and that most celestial beings would not take offense.
10. Plotinus, at least in his texts against the Gnostics, portrayed God as a separate entity that human souls needed to go towards, whereas Gnostics believed that in every human soul there was a divine spark of God already. However, Gnostics did not disagree with the neoplatonist notion of getting closer to the source.
11. Plotinus argued that God should be everywhere according to Gnostic teachings, and thus they were being contradictory in claiming that matter is evil, whereas Gnostics differentiated soul from substance, the latter not necessarily having God in it, or having a considerably lesser amount. This might be another case of Plotinus misunderstanding Gnostics, perhaps due to the lack of access to most of their written doctrines.
12. Plotinus argued that the good in the material realm is an indication of the goodness of it as a whole, whereas most Gnostics thought it was merely the result of the good nature of God slipping in through the cracks that the Demiurge could not cover.

Plotinus himself attempted to summarize the differences between neoplatonism and certain forms of Gnosticism with an analogy:

There are two people occupying the identical house, a beautiful house, where one of them censures its construction and its builder but nevertheless keeps living in it, and the other does not censure him and says rather that the builder made it most proficiently, and yet he is waiting for the time to come when he will be released from the house and will no longer require it.

[...]

It is possible, then, not to be lovers of the body, and to become pure, and to disdain death, and to know the higher beings and pursue them.

== See also ==
- Allegorical interpretations of Plato
- Henology
- Julian the Philosopher
- Modern paganism and New Age
- Neoplatonism and Christianity
- New religious movement
- On the Cave of the Nymphs in the Odyssey
- Sophism

== Sources ==
- Magris, Aldo (2005), "Gnosticism: Gnosticism from its origins to the Middle Ages (further considerations)", in Jones, Lindsay (ed.), MacMillan Encyclopedia of Religion, MacMillan
