= Allogenes =

Series of Gnostic texts

Allogenes is a series of Gnostic texts. The main character in these texts is Allogenes (Greek: ἀλλογενής), which translates as 'stranger,' 'foreigner,' or 'of another race.' The first text discovered was Allogenes as the third tractate in Codex XI of the Nag Hammadi library. The Coptic manuscript is a translation of a Greek original, likely written in Alexandria before 300 AD. In this text, containing Middle Platonic or Neoplatonic elements, Allogenes receives divine revelations.

A different text, The Temptation of Allogenes, was discovered as the fourth tractate in the Codex Tchacos. In this text, Allogenes resists temptation and ascends. Codex Tchacos, also written in Coptic, is likely older than NHC XI based on radiocarbon dating, but it is unknown exactly when the original texts were composed. Both texts have some damage and are incomplete.

Other Allogenes texts may have been written. In section 39.5.1 of the Panarion, Epiphanius of Salamis writes, "They (the Sethians) compose certain books in the name of great men, and say that there are seven books in Seth's name, and give the name 'Strangers' to other, different books." In section 40.2.2, Epiphanius also adds, "And by now they (the Archontics) also have the ones called the 'Strangers'—there are books with this title." Porphyry, in Life of Plotinus, mentions a Revelation bearing the name Allogenes.

== Summary of Allogenes (NHC XI,3) ==
The opening of the text discusses the existence of perfect individuals who are joined together with the mind and a guardian that taught Allogenes. The Triple-Powered One is the power that exists within the individuals and extends itself as word. The Triple-Powered One is a male virginal youth and the first of the Aeons from a unique triple-powered Aeon. He knows himself and the perfect Invisible Spirit and came to be in an Aeon who knows That One. The Triple-Powered One is a perfect, invisible, noetic Protophanes-Harmedon, and Kalyptos, a Triple-Male, empowers the individuals. The passage also describes the invisible, spiritual Triple-Powered-One, who contains all the individuals within himself and is greater than perfect, blessed, and always One. He provides for every power and is a nonsubstantial substance. Individuals can apprehend the Universal One by means of a First Thought, and that Vitality, Mentality, and That-Which-Is are one, although individually they are three.

The all-glorious One, Youel, speaks to Allogenes and reveals that he was given a great power by the Eternal before he arrived to distinguish things that are difficult and unknown. She anoints him and gives him power, telling him to guard the information about the Triple-Powered One in great silence and mystery. She describes the greatness of the Universal One that is higher than perfect and the Aeon of Barbelo, which acts within individuals to rectify failures from nature. The text describes the Universal One as being all-encompassing and known through the third silence of Mentality and the second undivided activity in the First Thought.

Youel reveals to Allogenes the existence of a powerful being that utters a sound. Youel proceeds to praise this being, calling it by various names and attributing to it great power and divinity. She then praises the Universal One, before Allogenes sees the glories of perfect individuals and all-perfect ones. Youel explains that the Triple-Powered One exists beyond those who exist, as divinity and non-substantiality. Youel reveals that the Triple-Male is beyond substance and that the self-begotten ones exist with it.

The text speaks about seeking and knowing the Good within oneself to become divine and perfect. After a hundred years of seeking, Allogenes experiences a revelation of the divine Autogenes, the youthful Savior, and other spiritual beings. He then sees holy powers by means of the Luminaries of the virginal male Barbelo, who guide him to the Vitality and Existence where he can know himself and the Unknown One. Allogenes is advised to still himself and not desire to be active, in order to maintain the inactivity of the Unknown One within him. He is told to be ignorant of the Unknown One even if he knows him, and to not dissipate in order to stand. Allogenes hears the Blessedness that allows him to know his proper self.

Allogenes describes his journey of seeking self-knowledge and encountering an eternal, intellectual, undivided motion that pertains to all the formless powers. He experiences a primary revelation of the Unknowable One, which fills him with revelation and power. Allogenes seeks the ineffable and Unknowable God, the Mediator of the Triple-Powered One who subsists in stillness and silence and is unknowable. He is then advised by the powers of the Luminaries to hear about God in so far as it is possible by means of a primary revelation. Allogenes proceeds to describe God as something that exists without Mind or Life or Existence or Non-Existence, incomprehensibly, and as another one superior to blessedness, divinity, and perfection. God is not boundless or corporeal or existent, but self-comprehending and unknowable.

Allogenes describes the Unknowable One as having blessedness, perfection, silence, and stillness. These attributes are entities of him that cannot be known and are beyond human comprehension. The Unknowable One is higher in beauty than all those that are good and exists in all things but is unknowable in every respect. Those who do not know God will be judged by themselves for not finding the true origin. The Unknowable One is corporeal but properly incorporeal and exists without any desire. It surrounds and empowers all things, but is an airless place of boundlessness. Allogenes advises not to seek more knowledge of the Unknowable One, but to leave the book upon a mountain and adjure the guardian. Finally, Allogenes, speaking to his son Messos, proclaims the seal for all the books of Allogenes.

== Summary of The Temptation of Allogenes (CT,4) ==
In the introduction, Allogenes and his son pray to God for a spirit of knowledge to reveal mysteries and understand where they come from, where they're going, and what they need to do to live, while on a mountain called Tabor. Satan appears and tempts Allogenes to enjoy the material world, but Allogenes refuses and says he seeks his Father who is above all realms. Satan tries to deceive Allogenes many times but ultimately fails and leaves in great shame. Allogenes cries out to God for mercy and help while in a deserted place. A bright cloud surrounds him, and he hears a message from it telling him that his prayer has been heard, and he will be told the gospel before leaving this place.

Allogenes is warned that as he ascends he will encounter six powers (Desire, Darkness, Ignorance, Death, Kingdom of the Flesh, and Foolish 'Wisdom' of Flesh), each of which will bind him and demand to know where he is going, but he is instructed to respond that what bound him has been killed and he is going to his Father above, and when he does so he will go over the angels and without fear.

== Origin and concordances ==
Although the roughly contemporary opponents of Allogenes literature provide some clues to its origin by virtue of their opinions, there is little concord among scholars in this regard; other than that it is Gnostic, it has yet to be definitively classified. The Temptation of Allogenes is a Christian Gnostic text that places Allogenes in Christ's stead in Matthew Chapter 4, adding Gnostic allusions; he describes "my Father" as "[he] who is raised high above all great Aeons of heavens, each with their own God." The NHC Allogenes is a non-Christian, wholly Gnostic text; it is largely thought to be Sethian, with Allogenes as an allegory for Seth. However, Wire clarifies that the text nowhere mentions Seth or his children. When The Temptation of Allogenes first appeared, there was hope that the new discovery might help to fill in some of the missing lines of Allogenes, but it is clear from what has been published that The Temptation of Allogenes is a wholly independent composition. At least it confirms the plurality of Allogenes books hinted at by Epiphanius, Porphyry and in the closing lines of Allogenes itself: "Proclaim them, O my son Mesos, as the seal for all the books of Allogenes."

Wire identifies concordances between Allogenes and the Greek Corpus Hermeticum or Hermetica, Apocryphon of John, Trimorphic Protennoia, Epistle of Eugnostos, the Sophia of Jesus Christ and the NHC Gospel of the Egyptians. Porphyry identified Allogenes in the same breath as Zostrianos, and in this purely Gnostic context, Wire adds the Untitled Text of the Bruce Codex, Marsanes and The Three Steles of Seth. Despite Porphyry's dismay at the Sethians' lack of digestion of Plato, some common turns of phrase between the Nag Hammadi Allogenes and Proclus' Elements of Theology turn up in the Fifth Century CE, but not before that. Nevertheless, based on the considerable Neoplatonic content and negative theology of Allogenes, Wire concludes that the text that we have is the same one read by Plotinus and his school in the 260s. John Douglas Turner suggests that Allogenes was written in direct response to the Neoplatonists' rejection of Zostrianos; Porphyry notes that his colleague Amelius wrote a 40-volume refutation to that text, which no longer survives and may have appeared around 240 CE. As a result, scholarship on Allogenes has largely existed in the shadow of Zostrianos. On the other hand, Dylan Burns separates from the rest in proposing that the NHC Allogenes is a post-Plotonian redaction of an earlier Greek text and is therefore not the same as the one known to Plotinus.

David Brons identifies the NHC Allogenes as "Non-Valentinian," but used by the school, and the Nag Hammadi Codex in which it has been recovered is otherwise devoted exclusively to Valentian texts.
