= Kalyptos =

Gnostic deity of Barbelo

In Sethian Gnosticism, Kalyptos ("the Hidden One") is one of the three emanations of Barbelo (along with Protophanes and Autogenes according to Zostrianos). Kalyptos is mentioned in Nag Hammadi texts such as Zostrianos, The Three Steles of Seth, Allogenes the Stranger, and Marsanes.

== See also ==
- Aeon (Gnosticism)
- Hypostasis (philosophy and religion)
