= Protophanes =

Gnostic deity of Barbelo

In Sethian Gnosticism, Protophanes ("the First-Appearing One") is one of the three emanations of Barbelo (along with Kalyptos and Autogenes according to Zostrianos). Protophanes is mentioned in Nag Hammadi texts such as Zostrianos, The Three Steles of Seth, Allogenes the Stranger, and Marsanes.

== See also ==
- Aeon (Gnosticism)
- Phanes
