= Luminary (Gnosticism) =

Angel-like being in Sethian Gnosticism

In Sethian Gnosticism, a luminary is an angel-like being (or heavenly dwelling place in the Apocryphon of John). Four luminaries are typically listed in Sethian Gnostic texts, such as the Secret Book of John, the Holy Book of the Great Invisible Spirit, and Zostrianos. The luminaries are considered to be emanations of the supreme divine triad consisting of the Father (Invisible Spirit), the Mother (Barbelo), and the Child (Autogenes). Listed from highest to lowest hierarchical order, they are:

1. Harmozel (or Armozel)
2. Oroiael
3. Daveithe (or Daveithai)
4. Eleleth

== Eleleth ==
Eleleth is a luminary in Gnostic cosmology and one of the four Sethian luminaries. Eleleth appears in Hypostasis of the Archons, Apocryphon of John, and The Three Forms of the First Thought found in the Nag Hammadi library in 1945 and is probably mentioned in the Gospel of Judas as El.

In The Hypostasis of the Archons, Eleleth comes down from the pleroma to save Norea after she cried out to the Monad for help against the Archons, who try to seize her. After Eleleth appeared, the Archons withdraw from Norea, and Eleleth informs Norea about her true origin and the origin of the world.

== Parallels in Mandaeism ==
In Mandaeism, a few Qulasta prayers list the names of lesser-known uthras in sets of four. They are referred to as the "four men, the sons of peace" (arba gubria bnia šlama) in Qulasta prayers 8, 49, 71, 75, and 77, as well as Right Ginza 5.4, 14, and 15.8. Qulasta prayer 17 and Left Ginza 1.2 refer to them as the "four uthras, the sons of light" (arba ʿutria bnia nhura). Mark J. Lofts (2010) considers them to be parallel to the Four Luminaries in Sethian Gnosticism. Qulasta prayers 17 and 77 list them as:

- Rhum-Hai ("Mercy")
- Īn-Hai ("Wellspring" or "Source of Life")
- Šum-Hai ("Name")
- Zamar-Hai ("Singer")

Qulasta prayer 49 lists the "four men, the sons of peace" as:

- Īn-Hai
- Šum-Hai (Šum can mean both Shem and "Name")
- Ziw-Hai ("Radiance")
- Nhur-Hai ("Light")

These four uthras are considered to be the kings (malkia) of the North Star, who give strength and life to the sun. Together with Malka Ziwa (another name for Hayyi Rabbi), they make up the "five primal beings of light." Conversely, Mandaeans consider the "five lords of the World of Darkness" to be Zartai-Zartanai, Hag and Mag, Gap and Gapan, Šdum, and Krun (the paired demons are considered to rule together as single lords). (See Manichaeism § The World of Light for similar parallels.)

== See also ==
- Angels in Judaism
- Hierarchy of angels
- List of angels in theology
- Uthra in Mandaeism
- Shkinta in Mandaeism
- Shekhinah
