= Trimorphic Protennoia =

Sethian Gnostic text from the New Testament apocrypha

Trimorphic Protennoia or Three Forms of First Thought is a Sethian Gnostic text from the New Testament apocrypha. The only surviving copy comes from the Nag Hammadi library (Codex XIII). The text describes three descents using the voice of Barbelo in first person. The voice is the source of life, knowledge, and the first thought. The voice is said to have three names, three masculinities, and three powers, and it is described as androgynous. It explains that Sophia descended to help counter the plan of the demon Yaldabaoth and the archons. The speaker invites the reader to enter the high perfect light and receive glory, enthronement, and baptism.

== Summary ==
=== The First Descent ===
Speaking in first person, the text starts by describing the speaker as the first thought, a movement in all things, and the source of life and knowledge. The speaker is called by three names, and is invisible yet able to reveal itself. The voice that comes from the speaker's thought is said to exist as three permanences: the father, the mother, and the son. The voice is a rich and glorious speech with three masculinities, powers, and names. The speaker descended into the underworld and shone down on the darkness and through the voice, knowledge comes. The Son, who is the Word, revealed the everlasting and preached to those in darkness and in the abyss, teaching ineffable mysteries to those who became children of the light. The voice is described as having three shapes in the manner of a triad, secretly in silence of the ineffable one.

The text continues by describing the creation and establishment of the eternal realms by the perfect son, the anointed, and his glory. The great light Eleleth (a luminary) says that he is king, and a great demon named Yaldabaoth, who took power from Sophia, appears. Sophia then reveals her voice secretly and comes down to the world of mortals to counter the plan of the demon. The demon creates a human being in Sophia's likeness, but it is a decree of his annulment. Sophia comes down to chaos and empowers her own, and reveals herself to the children of light, who are her portion. She breaks the bonds of the underworld demons and informs the children of light how to return to where they first were. Sophia is the first to descend for her portion, which is the spirit in the soul.

=== The Second Descent ===
The speaker is a voice that appeared through thought and is one joined to another. The speaker is called the unchanging speech, the mother of the voice, and the thought of the invisible one. The speaker has come twice, once in the likeness of masculinity and the second time in the likeness of a female. The speaker reveals the coming end of this realm and the beginning of the eternal realm without change. The powers are disturbed by the voice of the speaker, but do not recognize it. The speaker is androgynous, both mother and father, and gives shape to all through bearing light. The speaker invites the listener into the high perfect light and offers to glorify, enthrone, and baptize them. The speaker also reveals that they have hidden in everyone and revealed themselves in them, and that they created breath and cast the eternally holy spirit into their people.

=== The Third Descent ===
The speaker is the word in the ineffable voice and light that came from the great speech of the mother. The speaker reveals its mysteries to the reader, who is considered a brother or sister. The speaker then came three times: once as the voice's speech, then as the word, and finally as light. The speaker delivered the reader to various entities, and the reader was given the five seals from the light of the mother. The speaker wore Jesus and took him from the cross to his father's house. The text ends with the speaker proclaiming the ineffable five seals (a Sethian baptismal rite) to live in the reader and for the reader to live in it.

== Similarities with other texts ==
The content of the text is Sethian and, thus, shares beliefs with other Sethian Gnostic works, such as the Apocryphon of John, Zostrianos, Holy Book of the Great Invisible Spirit, and Three Steles of Seth.

The first-person pronouncements are similar to those in The Thunder, Perfect Mind.

Buckley (2010) notes similarities with Mandaean baptism (masbuta) as described in Mandaean texts.
