= Cainites =

Heresy described by Irenaeus to descredit Gnostic movements

The Cainites or Cainians (Ancient Greek: Καϊνοί, Kainoi, and Καϊανοί, Kaianoi) were a heresy allegedly venerating Cain and celebrating him for his sins, described by Irenaeus.

Irenaeus asserts in his Against Heresies. i. 31 that the Cainites are enemies of the God of Israel and venerated everyone who opposed him, including Cain. They would claim fellowship with Esau, Korah, and the men of Sodom. Liberation would be achieved by committing sins against the Creator. He further asserts that their holy scripture is the Gospel of Judas, which he believed to teach immorality. However, since the discovery of primary sources in the Nag Hammadi library, the descriptions by Irenaeus do not match the actual sources, and there is no reference to Cain in the sole extant manuscript of the Gospel of Judas. Although some descriptions attributed to Cainites bear resemblances to certain Gnostic sects, no Gnostic sect held a positive depiction of Cain or encouraged sins.

In none of the known Gnostic sources has Cain ever been portrayed in a positive light. In the Secret Book of John, Cain is identified with Yahweh and the evil brother of Abel (identified with Elohim). The Apocalypse of Adam, found in the Nag Hammadi library, also portrays Cain, as a son of Yaldabaoth, entirely negatively. The Valentinian Gospel of Phillip describes murder as the result of adultery, and blames Cain for introducing murder into the world, following into the footsteps of his demonic father. The Cainites did not exist outside the mind of heresiologists and was merely a designation for whatever belief-system they accused of heresy.

The Cainites are also mentioned by his contemporary Tertullian. He describes a Cainite woman using the Acta Pauli as authority for her teachings.

== In popular culture ==
- The book Demian, by Hermann Hesse, extensively draws upon the beliefs of the Cainite sect. The eponymous character Max Demian even convinces the protagonist Emil Sinclair that Christianity had misunderstood Cain's virtue over Abel's.
- The sect is mentioned by Lucifer in The Sandman #22 when talking to Cain in Hell, noting "no greater percentage of them turned up here than of any other religion".
- The sect is included as a dualist heresy in the computer game Crusader Kings 3.
- The Cainites are featured as antagonists in the Spanish HBO series 30 Coins.
- In Vampire: The Masquerade, the titular vampires are known as Cainites, and the so-called "Cainite Heresy" is re-imagined as a heretical vampire sect that persisted secretly into the Middle Ages.
- In the novel Sorrowland, the story revolves around the main character fleeing from a Cainite sect where they grew up in.

== See also ==
- Adamites
- Sethians
- Valentinianism

== Bibliography ==
- "Cainites" from the Catholic Encyclopedia
- "Cainities," Hastings' Dictionary of the New Testament

Attribution
