= Barbelo =

First emanation of God in some Gnostic cosmogony

Barbēlō (Greek: Βαρβηλώ) refers to the first emanation of God in several forms of Gnostic cosmogony. Barbēlō is often depicted as a supreme female principle, the single passive antecedent of creation in its manifold. This figure is also variously referred to as 'Mother-Father' (hinting at her apparent androgyny), 'The Triple Androgynous Name', or 'Eternal Aeon'. So prominent was her place amongst some Gnostics that some schools were designated as Barbeliotae, Barbēlō worshippers or Barbēlō gnostics.

== The nature of Barbēlō ==
=== Nag Hammadi Library ===
In the Apocryphon of John, a tractate in the Nag Hammadi Library containing the most extensive recounting of the Sethian Gnostic creation myth, the Barbēlō is described as "the first power, the glory, Barbēlō, the perfect glory in the aeons, the glory of the revelation". All subsequent acts of creation within the divine sphere (save, crucially, that of the lowest aeon Sophia) occurs through her coaction with God. The text describes her thus:

This is the first thought, his image; she became the womb of everything, for it is she who is prior to them all, the Mother-Father (Anthropos), the holy Spirit, the thrice-male, the thrice-powerful, the thrice-named androgynous one, and the eternal aeon among the invisible ones, and the first to come forth.

Barbēlō is found in other Nag Hammadi writings:

- Allogenes makes reference to a Double Powerful Invisible Spirit, a masculine female virgin, who is the Barbēlō.
- The Holy Book of the Great Invisible Spirit refers to a divine emanation called 'Mother', who is also identified as the Barbēlō.
- Marsanes—several places.
- Melchizedek—twice, the second time in a prayer of Melchizedek: "Holy are you, Holy are you, Holy are you, Mother of the aeons, Barbelo, for ever and ever, Amen."
- The Three Steles of Seth offers a description of "the first aeon, male virginal Barbelo, the first glory of the invisible Father, she who is called 'perfect'."
- Trimorphic Protennoia ('First Thought in Three Forms'), even in the first person: "He perpetuated the Father of all Aeons, who am I, the Thought of the Father, Protennoia, that is, Barbelo, the perfect Glory, and the immeasurable Invisible One who is hidden. I am the Image of the Invisible Spirit, and it is through me that the All took shape, and (I am) the Mother (as well as) the Light which she appointed as Virgin, she who is called 'Meirothea', the incomprehensible Womb, the unrestrainable and immeasurable Voice."
- Zostrianos—the aeon Barbēlō is referred to in many places.

In Zostrianos, Barbelo has three sublevels or subaeons that represent three distinct phases:

1. Kalyptos ("Hidden One"), the first and highest subaeon within the Aeon of Barbelo, representing the initial latency or potential existence of the Aeon of Barbelo.
2. Protophanes ("First Appearing One"), the second highest subaeon, is called a great perfect male Mind and represents the initial manifestation of the Barbelo Aeon.
3. Autogenes ("Self-Generated"), the self-generated actualization of the Barbelo Aeon, is the lowest of the three subaeons.

=== The Gospel of Judas ===
In The Gospel of Judas, Jesus challenges the Twelve Apostles to stand up and face him if they are "[strong enough] among humans to bring out the perfect Humanity. Only Judas is able to meet Jesus' challenge, standing before him and saying "I know who you are and where you've come from. You've come from the immortal realm of Barbelo, and I'm not worthy to utter the name of the one who's sent you."p. 23 Jesus responds by commanding him to "Step away from the others and I shall tell you the mysteries of the kingdom."p. 23 The scene is modeled after the Confession of Peter in the synoptic Gospels, where Jesus asks the Disciples who people say he is, and then who the disciples themselves think he is; Peter correctly states that he is the Messiah, and Jesus responds by giving him favored status among the Apostles (Matthew 16:13–23). There is a similar scene in the Gospel of Thomas, which climaxes with Thomas saying "Teacher, my mouth is utterly unable to say what you are like."p. 23

=== Pistis Sophia ===
In the Pistis Sophia Barbēlō is named often, but her place is not clearly defined. She is one of the gods (p. 359), "a great power of the Invisible God" (373), joined with Him and the three "Thrice-powerful deities" (379), the mother of Pistis Sophia (361) and of other beings (49); from her Jesus received His "garment of light" or heavenly body (13, 128; cf. 116, 121); the earth apparently is the "matter of Barbēlō" (128) or the "place of Barbēlō" (373).

=== In patristic texts ===
She is obscurely described by Irenaeus as "a never-aging aeon in a virginal spirit", to whom, according to certain "Gnostici", the Innominable Father wished to manifest Himself, and who, when four successive beings, whose names express thought and life, had come forth from Him, was quickened with joy at the sight, and herself gave birth to three (or four) other like beings.

She is noticed in several neighbouring passages of Epiphanius, who in part must be following the Compendium of Hippolytus, as is shown by comparison with Philaster (c. 33), but also speaks from personal knowledge of the Ophitic sects specially called "Gnostici" (i. 100 f.). The first passage is in the article on the Nicolaitans (i. 77 f.), but is apparently an anticipatory reference to their alleged descendants the "Gnostici" (77 A; Philast.). According to their view Barbēlō lives "above in the eighth heaven"; she had been 'put forth' (προβεβλῆσθαι) "of the Father"; she was mother of Yaldabaoth (some said, of Sabaoth), who insolently took possession of the seventh heaven, and proclaimed himself to be the only God; and when she heard this word she lamented. She was always appearing to the Archons in a beautiful form, that by beguiling them she might gather up her own scattered power.

Others, Epiphanius further seems to say (78 f.), told a similar tale of Prunikos, substituting Caulacau for Yaldabaoth. In his next article, on the "Gnostici", or Borborites (83 C D), the idea of the recovery of the scattered powers of Barbēlō recurs as set forth in an apocryphal Book of Noria, Noah's legendary wife.

For Noah was obedient to the archon, they say, but Noria revealed the powers on high and Barbelo, the scion of the powers—the opposite of the archon, as the other powers are. And she intimated that what has been taken from the Mother on High by the archon who made the world, and others with him—gods, demons, and angels—must be gathered from the power in the bodies, through the male and female emissions.

In both places Epiphanius represents the doctrine as giving rise to sexual libertinism. Mircea Eliade has compared these Borborite beliefs and practices involving Barbēlō to Tantric rituals and beliefs, noting that both systems have a common goal of attaining primordial spiritual unity through erotic bliss and the consumption of menses and semen.

In a third passage (91 f.), enumerating the Archons said to have their seat in each heaven, Epiphanius mentions as the inhabitants of the eighth or highest heaven "her who is called Barbēlō", and the self-gendered Father and Lord of all things, and the virgin-born (αὐτολόχευτον) Christ (evidently as her son, for according to Irenaeus her first progeny, "the Light", was called Christ); and similarly he tells how the ascent of souls through the different heavens terminated in the upper region, "where Barbērō or Barbēlō is, the Mother of the Living" (Genesis 3:20).

Theodoret (H. F. f. 13) merely paraphrases Irenaeus, with a few words from Epiphanius. Jerome several times includes Barbēlō in lists of portentous names current in Spanish heresy, that is, among Priscillianists; Balsamus and Leusibora being three times associated with it (Ep. 75 c. 3, p. 453 c. Vall.; c. Vigil. p. 393 A; in Esai. lxvi. 4 p. 361 c; in Amos iii. 9 p. 257 E).

== Significance ==
In Gnostic accounts of God, the notions of impenetrability, stasis and ineffability are of central importance. The emanation of Barbēlō may be said to function as an intermediary generative aspect of the Divine, or as an abstraction of the generative aspect of the Divine through its Fullness. The most transcendent hidden invisible Spirit is not depicted as actively participating in creation. This significance is reflected both in her apparent androgyny (reinforced by several of her given epithets), and in the name Barbēlō itself. Several plausible etymologies of the name (Βαρβηλώ, Βαρβηρώ, Βαρβηλώθ) have been proposed.

- William Wigan Harvey (on Irenaeus), and Richard Adelbert Lipsius (Gnosticismus, p. 115; Ophit. Syst. in Hilgenfeld's Zeitschrift for 1863, p. 445) have proposed Barba-Elo, 'The Deity-in Four', with reference to the tetrad, which by the report of Irenaeus proceeds from her. Her relation to this tetrad bears however no true analogy to the Col-Arba of Marcus; it forms only the earliest group of her progeny; and it is mentioned but once.
- 'The supreme Limit,' paravela, from the Indian vela, 'limit'—a suggestion made by Julius Grill (Untersuchungen über die Entstehung des vierten Evangeliums, Tübingen, 1902, pp. 396–397), who connects it with the Valentinian Horos, the Barbēlō being called 'the supreme limit' in relation to the Patēr akatonomastos on the one side and to the lower syzygies on the other.
- Wilhelm Bousset (Hauptprobleme der Gnosis, Göttingen, 1907, p. 14 f.) suggests that the word is a mutilation of parthenos—the intermediate form, Barthenōs, actually occurring in Epiphanius (Haer. xxvi. 1) as the name of Noah's wife.
- Fenton John Anthony Hort (DCB i. 235, 249) states that the "root balbel much used in the Targums (Buxtorf, Lex, Rabb. 309), in biblical Hebrew balal, signifying mixture or confusion, suggests a better derivation for Barbelo, as denoting the chaotic germ of various and discrete existence: the change from ל to ר is common enough, and may be seen in the alternative form Βαρβηρώ. If the Babel of Justinus (Hipp. Haer. v. 26; x. 15) is identical with Barbelo, as is at least possible, this derivation becomes still more probable."
- It may be an ad hoc Coptic construction signifying both 'Great Emission' (according to Bentley Layton's The Gnostic Scriptures) and 'Seed' according to F.C. Burkitt (in Church and Gnosis).

== See also ==
- Diana (mythology) – Roman goddess of hunting and the wild
- Ogdoad – Gnostic cosmology of eight heavens
- Tripura Sundari – Hindu goddess
