= Holy Book of the Great Invisible Spirit =

Gnostic text from the Nag Hammadi library

The Holy Book of the Great Invisible Spirit, also known as the Coptic Gospel of the Egyptians, is a Sethian Gnostic text found in Codices III and IV of the Nag Hammadi library. The text describes the origin of three powers: the Father, the Mother, and the Son, who came forth from the great invisible Spirit. The text emphasizes Seth as the origin of the seed of eternal life and the great, incorruptible race. It concludes with a prayer and a statement that it was written by the great Seth and placed in the mountain Charaxio to be revealed at the end of times.

== Summary ==
This opening describes the creation of the universe and the origin of the three powers: the Father, the Mother, and the Son. These powers are said to have come forth from the great invisible Spirit, who is the light of the aeons, the truth, and the incorruptions. The three powers are said to have emerged from the silence of the unknown Father, and they each have their own ogdoad-power. The first ogdoad is associated with the Father, the second with the Mother, and the third with the Son. The text describes the characteristics and powers of each of these three entities and how they were brought forth from the bosom of the Father through his providence.

Part of the text has multiple missing and unrecoverable lines, making it difficult to understand. A hidden, invisible mystery comes forth, written as the seven vowels, 22 times each. Several beings sing praises and give glory to the great, invisible, virginal Spirit and his male virgin. The great self-begotten living Word also appears, the son of the great Christ and the silence, who is the true god and the unborn physis. The text also mentions the singing of myriad angels, the eternal aeons, and providence from silence.

The text describes the creation of the divine Autogenes and the incorruptible man Adamas through the power of the great Logos. They give praise to the great Spirit and ask for a son, who is born as the great incorruptible Seth. The Father approves and the perfect hebdomad is completed, with the four great lights Harmozel, Oroiael, Daveithe, Eleleth, and the ministers Gamaliel, Gabriel, Samlo, and Abrasax, who bring forth Memory, Love, Peace, and eternal Life. The five ogdoads are completed, making a total of forty as an uninterpretable power.

The great Logos, the Autogenes, and the word of the pleroma of the four lights praise the Spirit along with various other entities such as the male virgin, the great Doxomedon-aeons, the thrice-male child, Youel, Esephech, and others. The passage also mentions the great Seth, the son of the incorruptible man Adamas, who also gives praise to the entities mentioned before and asks for his seed. Then, the great power of the light Plesithea, the mother of the angels and lights, comes forth and brings the fruit of Sodom and Gomorrah as a gift to Seth, who rejoices and takes his seed from her.

The world is created by the great light Eleleth and a cloud named hylic Sophia appears. The great angel Gamaliel requests the creation of an angel to rule over chaos and Hades, and the cloud agrees. Sakla and Nebruel create twelve angels (archons). Sakla declares himself as a jealous god, but a voice from on high reveals the existence of the Man and the Son of the Man. Metanoia is created and receives power to fill the deficiency. Hormos prepares the seed of the great Seth in a holy vessel, and Seth brings his seed to be sown in the aeons. The place where this seed was sown is known as Sodom, which some believe is the pasture of the great Seth, while others believe Seth took the plant out of Gomorrah and planted it in the second place, which he named Sodom.

The race that came forth through Edokla is the origin of the seed of eternal life. It will face challenges such as flooding, famine, plagues, and false prophets, but grace will be with those who belong to the race. The great Seth saw the schemes of the devil and his powers and gave praise to the great, uncallable Spirit. Four hundred ethereal angels were sent to guard the race, and Seth was sent to save it through a baptism through a Logos-begotten body. The saints are begotten by the holy Spirit through invisible symbols, and the holy baptism surpasses heaven. The text describes Jesus the living one as the Logos-begotten one and the one who armed the believers with knowledge of truth and an unconquerable power of incorruptibility.

The text describes a vision of various spiritual beings and leaders. These beings are associated with aspects of reality such as the sun, water, life, truth, and the incorruptible. The text states that through the renunciation of the Five Seals in the spring-baptism, those who are worthy of invocation will know these receivers and will never taste death. The text then goes on to address a prayer to Yesseus Mazareus Yessedekeus and to the Great Aeon and concludes with a statement that the book was written by the great Seth and placed in the mountain Charaxio, so that at the end of times, it may be revealed by the will of the divine Autogenes and the father.

== Analysis ==
The main contents concern the Sethian Gnostic understanding of how the earth came into being, how Seth, in the Gnostic interpretation, is incarnated as Jesus in order to release people's souls from the evil prison that is creation. More specifically, the text can be divided into four parts concerning: the creation of the heavenly world, the creation and significance of the race of Seth, a hymn, and the history behind the creation of the text itself. The text's usage of sequences of vowels (perhaps a representation of early Christian glossolalia) is mysterious, although the vowels of the final paragraph (u aei eis aei ei o ei ei os ei) can be partitioned to read (in Greek) who exists as Son for ever and ever. You are what you are, you are who you are. One explanation could be that these vowels are connected to the divine name YHWH. Another possibility is that the vowels could represent a secret, sacred way for the soul of the reader to move closer to gnosis much like Buddhist and Hindu dharani.

== Triads ==
The Holy Book of the Great Invisible Spirit lists a series of six different divine triads. The fourth, fifth, and sixth triads are also mentioned in Zostrianos.

| | Father | Mother | Child |
|---|---|---|---|
| 1. | Invisible Spirit | Silence-Pronoia-Barbelo | Thrice Male Child–Great Christ |
| 2. | Triple-Male Child | Youel | Esephech, Child of the Child |
| 3. | Great Christ | Pronoia | Self-Generated Logos |
| 4. | Self-Generated Logos | Mirothoe | Adamas |
| 5. | Adamas, Self-Generated Logos | Prophania | Seth and the Four Luminaries |
| 6. | Seth | Plesithea | Seed of Seth |

== See also ==
- Gnostic Gospels
- List of Gospels
- Monad (Gnosticism)
- New Testament apocrypha
