= Youel =

Youel may refer to:

- Jim Youel, an American football player
- Curtis Youel, an American sports coach
- Youel (Gnosticism), an angel in Gnosticism
