= Knights of Seth =

The Knights of Seth were a 19th-century British-German Neo-Sethian group that attempted to resurrect medieval Gnostic and dualistic Christian ideas. While achieving a certain popularity among wealthy young Englishmen in the 1850s, the Knights never gained considerable influence and were by many considered a mere gentlemen's club rather than a religious movement. Apart from a handful of members in Edinburgh and Berlin, the group presently appears to be almost extinct. The group is sometimes referred to by its Latin name Ordo Equester Sethiani.

== Core beliefs ==
Like the gnostics, the Knights of Seth believe that there is a true God and a false one. The latter is known as the demiurge. According to gnostic tradition the demiurge created the world. In doing so, the demiurge (Classical Greek for craftsman-creator) carried out an order of the true god. The malevolent demiurge, which sometimes goes by the name of Yaldabaoth, then usurped the true god's position.

According to the Ordo Equester, Adam's third son Seth was a messiah who could get in touch with the true god and acted as his herald, thwarting the plans of the evil demiurge. The Knights believe that seven prophets will deliver various teachings to humanity. These will then enable men to experience the true, hidden god. This allegedly requires studying different religions and meditation, resulting in a process of recognition (gnosis, Greek language for knowledge).

== Sources ==
- Stoyanov, Yuri (2004). The Other God. Dualist Religions from Antiquity to the Cathar Heresy. Yale University Press. ISBN 0-300-08253-3.
