= Youel (Gnosticism) =

Sethian Gnostic angel

In Sethian Gnosticism, Youel or Yoel is an angel who is described as a male virgin. Youel is mentioned in Nag Hammadi texts such as The Holy Book of the Great Invisible Spirit, Zostrianos, Allogenes the Stranger. In the latter two texts, Youel gives five revelations to protagonists Zostrianos and Allogenes, respectively, during their visionary ascents to heaven.

== See also ==
- Jehoel
