= Borborites =

Christian Gnostic sect

The Borborites or Borborians (Greek: Βορβοριανοί; in Egypt, Phibionites; in other countries, Koddians, Barbelites, Secundians, Socratites, Zacchaeans, Stratiotics) were claimed to be a Christian Gnostic sect, said to be descended from the Nicolaitans. The group is described in the Panarion of Epiphanius of Salamis (ch. 26), and Theodoret's Haereticarum Fabularum Compendium, the only extant sources on them from antiquity.

It is difficult to definitively know the practices of the group, as both Epiphanius and Theodoret were opponents of the group. According to Epiphanius, the sect were libertines who embraced pleasures of the earthly world.

== Etymology ==
The word Borborite comes from the Greek word βόρβορος, meaning "mud"; the name Borborites can therefore be translated as "filthy ones", and is unlikely to be the term the sect used for themselves. The name Koddian is claimed by Epiphanius to derive from an Aramaic term for a dish or bowl; J. J. Buckley writes that the likely root, kuda, refers in both Syriac Aramaic and Mandaic Aramaic to a hemorrhage after birth, or to the caul of a fetus, suggesting that the reference to a 'bowl' is euphemistic.

== Teachings ==
=== Sacred texts ===
The Borborites possessed a number of sacred books, including Noria (the name they gave to Noah's wife), a Gospel of Eve, The Apocalypse of Adam, and The Gospel of Perfection. They also used a version of The Gospel of Philip, but a quotation from the Borborite Gospel of Philip found in Epiphanius' Panarion is not found anywhere in the surviving version from Nag Hammadi. Several of the Borborites' sacred scriptures revolved around the figure of Mary Magdalene, including The Questions of Mary, The Greater Questions of Mary, The Lesser Questions of Mary, and The Birth of Mary. The Borborites also used a number of sacred texts attributed to Seth, the son of Adam and Eve, including the Second Treatise of the Great Seth and the Three Steles of Seth. Although the Borborites did also use both the Old Testament and the New Testament, they renounced the God of the Old Testament as an impostor deity.

=== Cosmology ===
They taught that there were eight heavens, each under a separate archon. In the seventh reigned a figure variously called Yaldabaoth or Sabaoth, creator of heaven and earth, the God of the Jews, represented by some Borborites under the form of an ass or a hog; hence the Jewish prohibition of swine's flesh. In the eighth heaven reigned Barbelo, the mother of the living; the Father of All, the supreme God; and Jesus Christ. They denied that Christ was born of Mary, or had a real body, defending instead docetism; and also denied the resurrection of the body. The human soul after death wanders through the seven heavens, until it obtains rest with Barbelo. Man possesses a soul in common with plants and beasts.

Epiphanius also indicates that the Phibionites honored 365 archons, with the 8 listed archons merely being the greatest of them. According to him, a male would have sex for each one of the archons as an offering.

Tangentially during his description of the Nicolaitans, Epiphanius claims that certain Gnostics, a subset of those "who are called Gnostics and Phibionites, the so-called disciples of Epiphanes, the Stratiotics, Levitics, Borborites and the rest", believed Barbelo to appear repeatedly to the archons in an attractive form so as to collect their semen, and in the process of doing so recover the power that had been "sown" in them. J. J. Buckley notes that this belief may have served as the grounds for certain Phibionite rituals.

=== Sexual sacramentalism ===
Epiphanius claims that the Borborites were inspired by Sethianism and that elements of sexual sacramentalism formed an important role in their rituals. He asserts that the Borborites engaged in a version of the eucharist in which they would smear their hands with menstrual blood and semen and consume them as the blood and body of Christ respectively. He also alleges that, whenever one of the women in their church was experiencing her monthly period, they would take her menstrual blood and everyone in the church would eat it as part of a sacred ritual.

The Borborites were also said to extract fetuses from pregnant women and consume them, particularly if the women accidentally became pregnant during related sexual rituals. Buckley notes that this implies treatment of an aborted foetus as "strayed semen", and would serve to prevent it from developing into another body "for the archons' clutches".

== Historiography ==
=== Background of Epiphanius ===
Epiphanius wrote that he had some first-hand knowledge of the sect. According to him, two Gnostic women approached him and attempted to recruit him into the sect and seduce him. They also allowed him to read their scriptures, yet Epiphanius claims he was untempted and did not join. Instead, he reported the group to the bishops, resulting in the expulsion of around 80 people from the city of Alexandria.

17:4 For I happened on this sect myself, beloved, and was actually taught these things in person, out of the mouths of people who really undertook them. Not only did women under this delusion offer me this line of talk, and divulge this sort of thing to me. With impudent boldness moreover, they even tried to seduce me themselves—like that murderous, villainous Egyptian wife of the chief cook—because they wanted me in my youth.... Now the women who taught this dirty myth were very lovely in their outward appearance but in their wicked minds they had all the devil's ugliness. But the merciful God rescued me from their wickedness, so that after reading their books, understanding their real intent and not being carried away with it, and after escaping without taking the bait, I lost no time reporting them to the bishops who were there, and finding out which ones were hidden in the church. Thus they were expelled from the city, about 80 persons, and the city was cleared of their tare-like, thorny growth.

— Epiphanius, Panarion, 26, 17.4, 17:8–9. Translated Frank Williams.

=== Opinions of modern scholars on reliability ===
Because everything that is known about the Borborites comes exclusively from polemics written by their opponents, it is still disputed whether or not these reports accurately reflect Borborite teachings or if they are unreliable propaganda intended to discredit them.

Stephen Gero finds the accounts written by Epiphanius and later writers plausible and connects them with earlier Gnostic myths.

J. J. Buckley, similarly, highlights parallels which the Phibionite or Koddian belief system and rituals described by Epiphanius show with other Gnostic groups. The consumption of seminal and fetal material, as a microcosm of Barbelo's seduction of the archons to recover captive light, shows parallels with the Manichaean belief that when vegetables are consumed by the Elect, the captive light-particles or divine sparks within are purified and liberated. The ritual use of semen and menses parallels the use of water and hamra, respectively, in a ritual metaphor for fertilization in a Mandaean masiqta. Contrasts include Mandaean pronatalism versus Phibionite antinatalism, the stratification of society into priests and laity (Mandaeism) or elect and hearers (Manichaeism) versus the work to liberate divine sparks being carried out by the Phibionite laity, and the Manichaean view of semen and menses as demonic versus the Phibionite identification of their own bodily fluids with the body of Christ.

Bart Ehrman, conversely, finds Epiphanius almost entirely unreliable. Ehrman writes that accusing opponents of wild sexual practices was common in Roman antiquity, so Epiphanius's lurid accounts should be seen as an outgrowth of that. He also finds Epiphanius's story of how he learned of their alleged doctrines implausible – if they truly were having scandalous rites, they would be unlikely to share them with non-members. More generally, documents written by Egyptian Gnostics themselves such as those found in the Nag Hammadi library do not seem to match what the anti-heresy writers claimed. While both their opponents and the Gnostics agreed that Gnosticism scorned the material world of the flesh, Gnostic writing has generally indicated a trend toward asceticism as a result – of ignoring or punishing the flesh through exertion and fasting. Proto-Orthodox writers instead concluded that if the Gnostics believed the material world to be inferior to that of the spirit, they would have thrown themselves into debauchery, a claim Ehrman finds unsupported by evidence and the opposite of what the actual Gnostics likely thought.

== Potential mention in Mandaean texts ==
Carlos Gelbert suggests that one passage in the Ginza Rabba (Right Ginza 9.1, paragraph 26) might describe the Borobites, although they are not given a name in Mandaic.
