= Melchizedek (text) =

Gnostic text

Melchizedek is the first tractate from Codex IX of the Nag Hammadi Library. It is a Gnostic work that features the Biblical figure Melchizedek. The text is fragmentary and highly damaged. The original text was 750 lines; of these, only 19 are complete, and 467 are fragmentary. The remaining 264 lines have been lost from the damage to the text. Like much of Nag Hammadi, the text was likely used by Gnostic Christians in Roman Egypt. It makes reference to Seth, suggesting it may have been used in Sethianism, a school of Gnosticism. The date it was written is unknown; all that can be said is that it was created during the period of early Christianity, presumably at some point during the 3rd century.

== Content ==
The main character and purported author is Melchizedek, who was the king of Salem and priest of El Elyon (the "most high God") in the Hebrew Bible. The text identifies Melchizedek with Jesus Christ; whether this was as a precursor or earlier equivalent, or as exactly the same entity, is disputed by scholars. Melchizedek, as Jesus, lives, preaches, dies, and experiences the resurrection over the Aeons, a Gnostic concept where different emanations of God appear at different stages of history. Melchizedek himself records a revelation given to him by the aeon Gamaliel, as well as a liturgical rite performed by Melchizedek.

The text also includes some anti-docetic passages that advocate for a Christology wherein the Incarnation of Jesus was a flesh-and-blood human who was born, ate and drank, suffered, and died. This is unusual for Gnostic writings; most Gnostics seemed to endorse docetic views that Jesus did not truly suffer, as he was a divine being separate from the mortal realm. Several possibilities exist to explain the difference. Orthodox writers who wrote about heresies, including Hippolytus of Rome and Epiphanius of Salamis, discuss a group called the Melchizedekians that subordinated Christ to Melchizedek and believed Jesus to be born a mortal man who suffered, in comparison to their more exalted view of Melchizedek. It is thus possible that the text was used by this group of Melchizedekians. Another possibility is that the text was written comparatively late in the time period, when Gnosticism was on the wane and was being influenced by the views that would eventually become orthodoxy. In this case, the text would stand as an example of a work of a writer influenced by both classic Gnosticism as well as orthodoxy, and had merged views from both.
