= Monad (Gnosticism) =

Adaptation of the Greek philosophical concept

In some Gnostic systems, the supreme being is known as the Monad, the One, the Absolute, Aiōn Teleos (the Perfect Aeon, αἰών τέλεος), Bythos (Depth or Profundity, Βυθός), Proarchē (Before the Beginning, προαρχή), Hē Archē (The Beginning, ἡ ἀρχή), the Ineffable Parent, and/or the Primal Father. The Monad is an adaptation of concepts of the monad in Greek philosophy to Christian belief systems.

The Apocryphon of John, written c. 120 CE, gives the following description:

The Monad is a monarchy with nothing above it. It is he who exists as God and Father of everything, the invisible One who is above everything, who exists as incorruption, which is in the pure light into which no eye can look. "He is the invisible Spirit, of whom it is not right to think of him as a god, or something similar. For he is more than a god, since there is nothing above him, for no one lords it over him. For he does not exist in something inferior to him, since everything exists in him. For it is he who establishes himself. He is eternal, since he does not need anything. For he is total perfection.

== Historical background ==
The term monad comes from the Greek feminine noun monas (nominative singular, μονάς), "one unit," where the ending -s in the nominative form resolves to the ending -d in declension.

Prominent early Christian gnostics like Valentinus taught that the Monad is the high source of the Pleroma, the region of light constituting "the fullness of the Godhead." Through a process of emanation, various divine entities and realms emerge from the One. Arranged hierarchically, they become progressively degraded due to their remoteness from the Father. The various emanations of the One, totaling thirty in number (or 365, according to Basilides), are called Aeons. Among them exist Jesus Christ (who resides close to the Father) and the lowest emanation, Sophia (wisdom), whose fall results in the creation of the material world.

According to Theodoret's book on heresies (Haereticarum Fabularum Compendium i.18), the Arab Christian Monoimus (c. 150–210) used the term Monad to mean the highest god that created lesser gods, or elements (similar to Aeons). In some versions of Christian gnosticism, especially those deriving from Valentinius, a lesser deity known as the Demiurge (see also Neoplatonism, Plotinus) had a role in the creation of the material world separate from the Monad. In these forms of Gnosticism, the God of the Old Testament (Hebrew Bible), YHWH, is often considered to have been the Demiurge, not the Monad, or sometimes different passages are interpreted as referring to each.

According to Hippolytus of Rome, this view was inspired by the Pythagoreans, for whom the first existing thing was the Monad, which begat the dyad, which begat the numbers, which begat the point, begetting lines, and so on. Pythagorean and Platonic philosophers like Plotinus and Porphyry condemned the "gnosis" that would later characterize Gnostic systems for their treatment of the Monad or One (see Neoplatonism and Gnosticism).

For a long time, the legend persisted that a young man named Epiphanes, who died at 17, was the leader of Monadic Gnosticism. However, scholars think the legend may have come from a misunderstanding of the Greek word epiphanēs, which may have been mistaken as a personal name if in text, when in fact the Greek word means distinguished, as in a distinguished teacher.

== See also ==
- Ein Sof
- Hayyi Rabbi
- Holy Book of the Great Invisible Spirit
- La Monadologie
- Monad (disambiguation)
