= Marsanes =

Gnostic text

Marsanes is a Sethian Gnostic text from the New Testament apocrypha. The only surviving copy comes from the Nag Hammadi library, albeit with 14 pages completely missing and a large number of lines throughout the text damaged beyond recovery. Scholars speculate that the text was originally written by a Syrian in Greek during the third century. The content of the text focuses on the 13 seals, the Triple-Powered One, the shape and structure of the soul, acquiring power and knowledge, and an apocalyptic vision.

== Summary ==
The opening lines of the document are mostly unrecoverable. The thirteenth seal is established "with the summit of knowledge and the certainty of rest." The text discusses the other 12 seals, first mentioning the power that will provide rest and protect those who receive it from passions and division. Other seals concern the conversion of those within, the self-begotten ones, salvation and wisdom, the mind, Barbelo, the Invisible One, and the Spirit. The thirteenth seal speaks of the Silent One who was not known and the primacy of the undistinguished one. Marsanes has achieved understanding of the true existence of everything, including unbegotten beings, divine aeons, the sense-perceptible and intelligible worlds, and has come to know the boundary of the sense-perceptible world, with a focus on the Self-begotten One who descended from the Unbegotten One who is the Spirit and has the ability to save a multitude.

Marsanes searches for the kingdom of the Triple-Powered One and questions its origin, the differences among the aeons, and the number of unbegotten ones. Marsanes perceives that the Triple-Powered One worked from silence and exists among those that truly exist. The third power of the Triple-powered leads Marsanes into the aeon Barbelo and explains that the knowledge and hypostasis of the Triple-Powered One is the source of its power. Marsanes sees the place of the invisible Spirit and it unfolds until it reaches the upper region, causing the whole place to be illuminated.

The text continues discussing the spirit and power of the One who possesses three powers and the importance of knowledge and understanding. The text mentions the great crown and the elect ones in the last times, and also mentions the Silent One, the Triple-Powered One, and the One who does not have breath. The text also speaks of a being who exists completely and is seen by the great feminine, but knowledge is limited and one runs the risk of ignorance. The text also mentions the cosmic hebdomad and a day that lasts forever. It explains the division of powers among beings, including those in the form of beasts and animals, and their origin from being. Much of the text is missing or unrecoverable and the full meaning is unclear.

The text discusses the shape and structure of the soul. It mentions that the soul has different shapes and that the second shape of the soul is spherical and is made up of simple vowels and diphthongs. The third shape of the soul is different from the first but resembles it, and the fourth and fifth shapes were not fully revealed. The text mentions that consonants exist with vowels and are commanded and submit, and they make up the nomenclature of the angels. The text also mentions that some sounds are superior to others, such as the aspirates over the inaspirates, and that there are names made up of vowels and consonants that resemble each other.

Marsanes discusses acquiring power and knowledge for oneself to bear fruit. Committing sin will result in the opposite of salvation. Marsanes urges the reader to examine who is worthy to reveal divine knowledge and not to desire the sense-perceptible world. The text mentions the intelligible world and the embodied souls not understanding the perfection, which is more than the angels, stars, and planets. Marsanes mentions numbers and relationships among them, with the ultimate goal of submitting to a power above.

The final part of the text is heavily fragmented and many details are missing or unclear. It appears to be a vision concerning the destiny of souls. Marsanes asks about the power of the names and receives a response. He then has a vision of fearsome angels and is aided by an angel named Gamaliel, who leads him to a revelation about judgment and a cleansing from sin through a living water.

== Analysis ==
Like Zostrianos, and Allogenes, the text describes a very elaborate esoteric cosmogony of successive emanations from an original God, as revealed by Marsanes, who is recognized as a Gnostic prophet. Within the text there are indications that the Sethians had developed ideas of monism, an idea comparable to Heracleon's notion of universal perfection and permanence as expressed through the constancy of the total mass of things within it (that is, all matter in the universe may only change form, and may not be created or destroyed), and the later Stoic insistence of nothing existing beyond the material. The text also is an apocalypse that may at one point have been used by the school of Plotinus in Rome. Common Gnostic thought is especially prominent through the text's discussion on the power of sacred knowledge, which can allow readers to ascend through the levels of the universe until they reach the highest heaven where God resides.

== Seals ==
The 13 seals in Marsanes are listed from in lowest to highest, ascending order.

Number	Seal	Notes
1	The First	corporeal; the physical, material realm?
2	The Second	corporeal; the sublunar realm?
3	The Third	noncorporeal but sensible; the planetary spheres?
4	The Sojourn	incorporeal; disembodied souls
5	The Repentance	incorporeal; repentant souls "in Marsanes"
6	The Self-Generated Aeons	incorporeal; the individuals?
7	Autogenes (the Self-Generated One)	
8	Protophanes (Mind)	
9	Kalyptos (the Hidden One)	
10	The Barbelo Aeon	
11	The Triple-Powered One	
12	The Invisible Spirit	
13	The Unknown Silent One	
