= Archontics =

2nd century Christian sect

The Archontics, or Archontici, were a Gnostic sect that existed in Syria and Armenia, who arose towards the mid 4th century CE. They were thus called from the Greek word ἄρχοντες, "principalities", or "rulers", by reason that they held the world to have been created and ruled by malevolent Archons.

== History ==
Epiphanius of Salamis seems to be the earliest Christian writer who speaks of this sect. He relates that a young priest in Palestine named Peter had been charged with heresy, deposed from the office of the priesthood and expelled by Bishop Aëtius. He fled into a part of Arabia, where there was a center of Ebionitism. In his old age, he returned to Palestine, where he lived the life of an anchorite in a cave near Jerusalem and attracted followers by the austerity of his life and the practice of extreme poverty. Shortly before the death of Constantius II (337–361), Eutactus, coming from Egypt, visited the anchorite Peter and was imbued by him with the doctrines of the sect and carried them into Greater and Lesser Armenia.

== Beliefs ==
The Archontics held that there were Seven Heavens, ruled by the Demiurge, surrounded by Archons, begotten by him, who are the jailers of the souls. In the eighth heaven dwells the supreme Mother of light. The king or tyrant of the seventh heaven is Sabaoth, who they argued was the god of the Jews and the father of the Devil. The Devil, dwelling upon earth, rebelled against his father, and opposed him in all things, and by Eve begot Cain and Abel. Cain slew Abel in a quarrel about their sister, whom both loved.

"They say," records Epiphanius, "that the soul is the food of the Archons and Powers without which they cannot live, because she is of the dew from above and gives them strength. When she has become imbued with knowledge ... she ascends to heaven and gives a defence before each Power and thus mounts beyond them to the upper Mother and Father of the All whence she came down into this world."

== Practices ==
"Some of them", continues Epiphanius, "pretend to fast after the manner of the monks, deceiving the simple, and boast of having renounced all property." Theodoret reports that it was the practice of some to pour oil and water on the heads of the dead, thereby rendering them invisible to the Archons and withdrawing them from their power. However, Epiphanius states that "they condemn baptism and reject the participation of the Holy Mysteries as something introduced by the tyrant Sabaoth, and teach other fables full of impiety."

== Texts ==
Their apocryphal books included:

- The greater and lesser Symphonia
- The Ascension of Isaiah
- Allogenes

== In Mandaean texts ==
Gelbert (2023) suggests that in the Ginza Rabba (Right Ginza 9.1), the Mandaic term nakriṭia is actually a reference to the Archontics.

== Bibliography ==
- Jonas, Hans (1958). The Gnostic Religion. p. 169.
- Layton, Bentley (1987). The Gnostic Scriptures. Doubleday. pp. 191–198.

Attribution
