= William Harvey (priest) =

English cleric and academic

William Wigan Harvey (17 January 1810 – 7 May 1883) was an English cleric and academic. Born at Great Stanmore, he was educated at Eton College and King's College, Cambridge. He became a Fellow of King's in 1831, and a Fellow of the Society of Antiquaries of London. Later he was rector of Buckland, and then of Ewelme, a controversial appointment that brought criticism on William Gladstone. He died at Ewelme.

Harvey was also a cricketer with amateur status, active in 1831. He made his debut in 1831 and appeared in one match, playing for Cambridge University. He scored nine runs with a highest score of 5 and took no wickets.

== Bibliography ==
- Haygarth, Arthur (1996) [1862]. Scores & Biographies, Volume 1 (1744–1826). Kennington: Frederick Lillywhite. ISBN 978-19-00592-23-9.
- Haygarth, Arthur (1997) [1862]. Scores & Biographies, Volume 2 (1827–1840). Kennington: Frederick Lillywhite. ISBN 978-19-00592-23-9.
