= Norea =

Figure in Gnostic cosmology

Norea is a figure in Gnostic cosmology. She plays a prominent role in two surviving texts from the Nag Hammadi library. In Hypostasis of the Archons, she is the daughter of Adam and Eve and sister of Seth. She sets fire to Noah's Ark and receives a divine revelation from the Luminary Eleleth. In Thought of Norea, she "extends into prehistory" as "she assumes the features here of the fallen Sophia." In Mandean literature, she is instead identified as the wife of either Noah or Shem.

Birger A. Pearson identifies her as "a feminine counterpart to Seth, just as Eve is the 'female counterpart' to Adam," and Roel van den Broek refers to her as "on the one hand [...] a saviour figure and on the other the prototype of the saved gnostic."

== Names and associations ==
According to Epiphanius of Salamis, the Borborites identified Norea with Pyrrha, the wife of Deucalion (a Greek figure similar to Noah). He suggested that the name Norea was a mistranslation of Pyrrha based on an assumed connection with nura, Syriac for "fire".

Elsewhere, Epiphanius says that the Sethians identify Seth's wife as Horaia, almost certainly another name for Norea. Birger Pearson argues that Norea is based on the Jewish legend of Naamah, and that the name Norea derives from Horaia (meaning "beautiful", "pleasant", or "lovely"), the Greek equivalent of the Hebrew name Naamah. According to Jewish legend, Naamah married Seth and was sexually involved with angelic beings, characteristics shared by Norea in Hypostasis; late medieval legends that Pearson and M. R. James take to reflect much earlier traditions also have Noah's wife oppose the construction of the Ark, which again echoes the account in the Hypostasis. However, Pearson notes that "her role as a seductress of the 'sons of God' has [...] been transposed in the gnostic literature, in a typically gnostic hermeneutical inversion." Pearson also argues that Noba, named as a daughter of Adam and Eve in the Chronicles of Jerahmeel, is a corrupted Latin translation of Norea.

Ross Kraemer draws comparisons between Norea and Aseneth as described in Joseph and Aseneth. Both are virgins who resemble or are linked to divine female beings, receive heavenly revelations, and help others find salvation. She suggests that the stories around Norea may have developed in a Jewish community "characterized by the presence and public activity of women not unlike Norea and Aseneth."

In Hypostasis, Norea is given the epithet "The virgin whom no power has defiled". This same phrase is applied to Mary in the Gospel of Philip, another Nag Hammadi text.

== In Gnostic literature ==
In The Hypostasis of the Archons (The Reality of the Rulers), Norea is the daughter of Eve and the younger sister of Seth; both are members of the pure race. The archons decide to destroy the world with a deluge, but their leader, the Demiurge, warns Noah to build an ark, which Norea tries to board. Noah stops her, so she blows upon the ark and sets it ablaze. The rulers try to rape her, but she cries to the God of the Entirety for help. The angel Eleleth appears and frightens the rulers away before revealing her origins; she is a child of the spirit.

On the Origin of the World refers to an Account of Oraia and the First Book of Noraia. These books were not preserved in the Nag Hammadi library.

Epiphanius of Salamis summarizes a book called Noria in the Panarion (Against Heresies) (26.1.3-9). According to this summary, she burned Noah's Ark three times, then revealed the means of recovering stolen sparks through sexual emissions. It is unknown whether this is one of the books mentioned in Origin.

== Sources ==
- Bullard, Roger (1970). The Hypostasis of the Archons: The Coptic Text with Translation and Commentary. Berlin: Walter De Gruyter & Co.
- Robinson, James, ed. The Nag Hammadi Library in English. 3rd edition. San Francisco: Harper and Row, 1988. (Introductions to the translations of some texts include information about Norea)
- Stroumsa, Gedaliahu A. G. Another Seed: Studies in Gnostic Mythology. Nag Hammadi Studies 24. Leiden: E. J. Brill, 1984.
- Elaine Pagels & Karen King Reading Judas – The Gospel and the Shaping of Christianity. Viking Penguin, 2007. – German edition: Das Evangelium des Verräters – Judas und der Kampf um das wahre Christentum. – Verlag dtv, 2011. – loc. cit. p. 133.
- Epiphanius (2009). The Panerion of Epiphanius of Salamis. Book I (Sects 1-46). Translated by Williams, Frank. Boston: Brill.
- Pearson, Birger (1990). Gnosticism, Judaism, and Egyptian Christianity. Minneapolis: Fortress Press.
- Pearson, Birger (1988). "Revisiting Norea". In King, Karen (ed.). Images of the Feminine in Gnosticism (1st Trinity Press International ed.). Harrisburg: Trinity Press International. p. 273.
- van den Broek, Roelof (2013). Gnostic Religion in Antiquity. Cambridge: Cambridge University Press.
