= Sethianism =

Gnostic religion of the 2nd and 3rd centuries

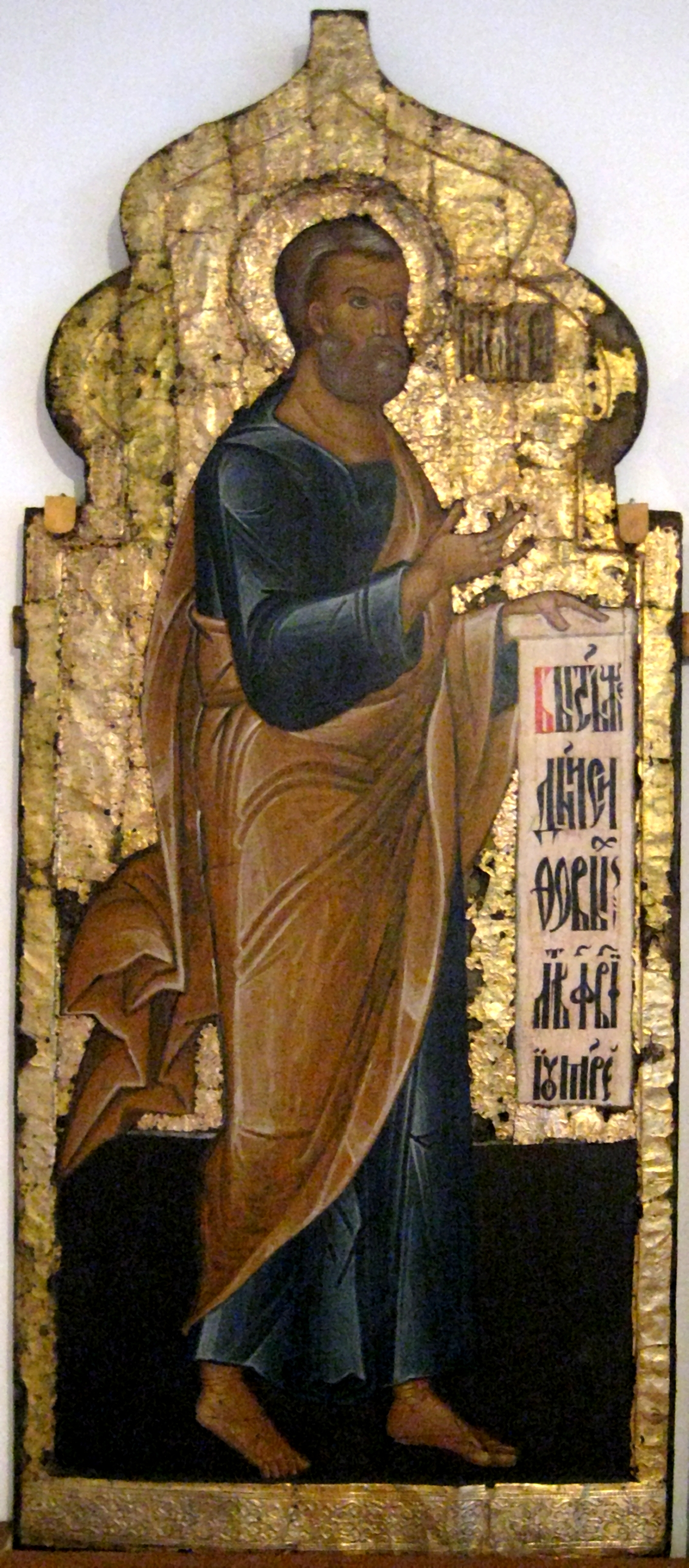
Seth. Patriarchs line in iconostasis. Zhdan Dementiev, Vologda. Cathedral of the Assumption, St. Cyril-Belozersky Monastery. Museum of Cyril Belozersky Monastery.

The Sethians (Ancient Greek: Σηθιανοί, romanized: Sēthianoi) are one of the main currents of Gnosticism during the 2nd and 3rd century AD, along with Valentinianism and the Basilidians. According to John D. Turner, it originated in the 2nd century AD as a fusion of two distinct Hellenistic Judaic philosophies and was influenced by Christianity and Middle Platonism. However, the exact origin of Sethianism is not properly understood.

== History ==
=== Mentions ===
The Sethians (Latin Sethoitae) are first mentioned, alongside the Ophites, in the 2nd century, by Irenaeus (who was antagonistic towards Gnosticism) and in Pseudo-Tertullian (Ch. 30). According to Frederik Wisse, all subsequent accounts appear to be largely dependent on Irenaeus. Hippolytus repeats information from Irenaeus.

According to Epiphanius of Salamis (c. 375), Sethians were in his time found only in Egypt and Palestine, but fifty years earlier, they had been found as far away as Greater Armenia. (Note: Turner: "Around 375 A.D., Epiphanius has difficulty recalling where he had encountered Sethians, and says that they are not to be found everywhere, but now only in Egypt and Palestine, although fifty years before they had spread as far as Greater Armenia (Pan. 39.1.1 2; 40.1).")

Philaster's (4th century AD) Catalogue of Heresies (Note: One of the sources of Epiphanius, the lost Syntagma of Hippolytus of Rome, was also the source for Christian heresies before Noetus.) places the Ophites, Cainites, and Sethians as pre-Christian Jewish sects. (Note: Nathaniel Lardner (1838): "Philaster has three chapters of Ophites, Cainites, and Sethians. They are placed by him among the heresies before Christ, and are the very first in his catalogue. Nor has he any thing that might lead us to think them Christians") However, since Sethians identified Seth with Christ (Second Logos of the Great Seth), Philaster's belief that the Sethians had pre-Christian origins, other than in syncretic absorption of Jewish and Greek pre-Christian sources, has not found acceptance in later scholarship.

=== Origins and development ===
Hans-Martin Schenke was one of the first scholars to categorize several texts in the Nag Hammadi library as Sethian.

According to John D. Turner, British and French scholarship tends to see Sethianism as "a form of heterodox Christian speculation", while German and American scholarship views it as "a distinctly inner-Jewish, albeit syncretistic and heterodox, phenomenon." Roelof van den Broek notes that "Sethianism" may never have been a separate religious movement but that the term rather refers to a set of mythological themes that occur in various texts. According to Turner, Sethianism was influenced by Christianity and Middle Platonism, and six phases can be discerned in the interaction of Sethianism with Christianity and Platonism.

Phase 1. According to Turner, two different groups, existing before the 2nd century CE, formed the basis for the Sethians: a Jewish group of possibly priestly lineage, the so-called Barbeloites, named after Barbelo, the first emanation of the Highest God, and a group of Biblical exegetes, the Sethites, the "seed of Seth".

Phase 2. The Barbeloites were a baptizing group that in the mid-2nd century fused with Christian baptizing groups. They started to view the pre-existing Christ as the "self-generated (Autogenes) Son of Barbelo", who was "anointed with the Invisible Spirit's 'Christhood'". According to Turner, this "same anointing [was] received by the Barbeloites in their baptismal rite by which they were assimilated to the archetypal Son of Man." The earthly Jesus was regarded as the guise of Barbelo, appearing as the Divine Logos, and receiving Christhood when he was baptized.

Phase 3. In the later 2nd century CE, the Christianized Barbeloites fused with the Sethites, together forming the Gnostic Sethianists. Seth and Christ were identified as bearers of "the true image of God who had recently appeared in the world as the Logos to rescue Jesus from the cross."

Phase 4. At the end of the 2nd century, Sethianism grew apart from the developing Christian orthodoxy, which rejected the Docetian view of the Sethians on Christ.

Phase 5. In the early 3rd century, Sethianism was fully rejected by Christian heresiologists, and Sethianism shifted toward the contemplative practices of Platonism, while losing their interest in their own origins.

Phase 6. In the late 3rd century, Sethianism was attacked by neo-Platonists like Plotinus, and Sethianism alienated from Platonism. In the early to mid-4th century, Sethianism fragmented into various sectarian Gnostic groups, like the Archontics, Audians, Borborites, and Phibionites. Some of these groups existed into the Middle Ages.

=== Relationship with Mandaeism ===
Various scholars have noted many similarities between Mandaeism and Sethianism. Kurt Rudolph (1975) has observed many parallels between Mandaean texts and Sethian Gnostic texts from the Nag Hammadi library. Birger A. Pearson also compares the "Five Seals" of Sethianism, which he believes is a reference to quintuple ritual immersion in water, to Mandaean masbuta. According to Buckley (2010), "Sethian Gnostic literature ... is related, perhaps as a younger sibling, to Mandaean baptism ideology." Mark J. Lofts (2010) makes a bolder claim by arguing that Mandaeism is in fact a living tradition of Sethian Gnosticism.

== Theology ==
Sethianism claims that gnosis first descended upon Seth, the third son of Eve and Adam, whose knowledge the Sethians regard as their origin. Norea, the wife of Noah, may also have played a role, as seen in Mandaeism and Manichaeism. The Sethian cosmogonic myth gives a prologue to book of Genesis and the rest of the Pentateuch, presenting a radical reinterpretation of the orthodox Jewish conception of creation and the divine's relation to reality. The Sethian cosmogony is most famously contained in the Apocryphon of John, which describes an Unknown God. (Note: In contrast to cataphatic theology, which describes God through a series of positive statements such as omniscient and omnipotent, the Sethian mythology approaches God by apophatic theology ("negative theology"), stating that God is immovable, invisible, intangible, ineffable.) Many of the Sethian concepts were derived from a fusion of Platonic or Neoplatonic concepts with the Old Testament (Hebrew Bible), as was common in Hellenistic Judaism, exemplified by Philo (20 BC–40 AD).

=== Creation ===
From the "Unknown God" emanate aeons, a series of paired female and male beings. The first of these is Barbelo, who is a co-actor in subsequent emanations. The aeons that result are representative of the various attributes of God, which are indiscernible when they are not abstracted from their origin. (Note: In this way, Barbelo and the emanations may be seen as poetic devices allowing an otherwise utterly unknowable God to be discussed in a meaningful way amongst initiates.) God and the aeons comprise the total of the spiritual universe, known as the Pleroma.

In some versions of the myth, the aeon Sophia imitates God's actions, performing an emanation of her own without the prior approval of the other aeons in the Pleroma. This results in a crisis within the Pleroma, leading to the appearance of the Yaldabaoth, a "serpent with a lion's head". This figure is commonly known as the demiurge, the "artisan" or "craftsman", after the figure in Plato's Timaeus. (Note: Ancient Greek: δημιουργός, romanized: dēmiourgós; Latin: demiurgus, lit. 'public worker' or 'skilled worker', idiomatically closer to 'artisan' or 'craftsperson'. Derived from the Ancient Greek δήμος, demos, 'belonging to the public' + έργον, ergon, 'work'.) Sophia at first hides this being, but it subsequently escapes, stealing a portion of divine power from her in the process.

The Yaldabaoth uses this stolen power to create a material world imitating the divine Pleroma. To complete this task, he spawns a group of entities known collectively as Archons—the "petty rulers" and craftsmen of the physical world. Like him, they are commonly depicted as zoomorphic, with animal heads. Some texts explicitly identify the Archons with the fallen angels described in the Jewish apocryphal book of Enoch and its descendant Enochic traditions, using the myth of Watchers to explain the corruption of the material world.

At this point, the events of the Sethian narrative begin to cohere with the events of Genesis, with the demiurge and his archontic cohorts fulfilling the role of the creator. In Genesis, the demiurge proclaims himself the only god, asserting that no other gods are superior to him. However, the audience's understanding of the context and prior events reinterprets this declaration and the creator's nature in a dramatically different way.

The demiurge unknowingly emanates a shadow "Image" of Adam while unwittingly transferring the portion of power stolen from Sophia into the first physical human body. He then creates Eve from Adam's rib in an attempt to isolate and regain the power he has lost. By way of this, he attempts to rape Eve, who now contains Sophia's divine power; several texts depict him as failing when Sophia's spirit transplants itself into the Tree of the Knowledge of Good and Evil. The pair eats from the tree of divine epignosis, guided by Jesus, appearing as an "eagle" above it, to help them remember their true "nature above".

=== Theological significance ===
The addition of the prologue radically alters the significance of events in the Garden of Eden. Rather than emphasizing a fall of human weakness in breaking God's command, Sethians (and their inheritors) emphasize a crisis of the Divine Fullness as it encounters the ignorance of matter, as depicted in stories about Sophia. Eve and Adam's removal from the Archon's paradise is seen as a teleological step towards freedom from the Archons as part of the "sacred plan" hinted at in the Secret Apocryphon of John.

== Sethian texts ==
Most surviving Sethian texts are preserved only in Coptic translation of the Greek original. Very little direct evidence of Gnostic teaching was available prior to the discovery of the Nag Hammadi library, a collection of 4th-century Coptic translations of Gnostic texts, perhaps hidden in reaction to Athanasius of Alexandria's Easter letter of 367, which banned the use of non-canonical books. Some of these texts are known to have been in existence in the 2nd century, but it is impossible to exclude the presence of later syncretic material in their 4th-century translations.

- The Gospel of Judas (Codex Tchacos, c. 300; mentioned by Irenaeus, c. 180)
- Nag Hammadi library:
  - The Apocalypse of Adam
  - The Apocryphon of John (mentioned by Irenaeus, c. 180)
  - The Thought of Norea
  - The Trimorphic Protennoia (Codex XIII)
  - The Holy Book of the Great Invisible Spirit (also known as the Coptic Gospel of the Egyptians)
  - Zostrianos
  - Three Steles of Seth
  - Marsanes
  - Melchizedek
  - Allogenes
  - The Second Treatise of the Great Seth
  - The Reality of the Rulers, also known as The Hypostasis of the Archons
  - The Thunder, Perfect Mind
- The Untitled Text (or Untitled Apocalypse or The Gnosis of the Light) (Bruce Codex, c. 5th century)
- The Coptic Apocalypse of Paul

The Gospel of Judas is the most recently discovered Gnostic text. National Geographic has published an English translation of it, bringing it into mainstream awareness. It portrays Judas Iscariot as the "thirteenth spirit (daemon)", who "exceeded" the evil sacrifices the disciples offered to Saklas by sacrificing the "man who clothed me (Jesus)". Its reference to Barbelo and inclusion of material similar to the Apocryphon of John and other such texts, connects the text to Barbeloite and/or Sethian Gnosticism.

== See also ==
- Gnosticism and Neoplatonism
- John D. Turner
- Knights of Seth (19th-century "Neo-Sethian" group)
- List of Gnostic sects
- Second Treatise of the Great Seth (Nag Hammadi text which in spite of its title does not actually make reference to Seth)
- Five Seals
- Valentinianism
- Euchites
- Adamites
- Cainites

== Sources ==
- Broek, Roelof van den (2013), Gnostic Religion in Antiquity, Cambridge University Press
- Hancock, Curtis L. (1991), "Negative Theology in Gnosticism and Neoplatonism", in Wallis; Bregman (eds.), Studies in Neoplatonism: Ancient and Modern, Volume 6, SUNY Press, ISBN 0-7914-1337-3
- Klijn, Albertus Frederik Johannes (1977), Seth: in Jewish, Christian and gnostic literature, BRILL
- Lardner, Nathaniel (1838), The works of Nathaniel Lardner
- Meyer, Marvin (2007), The Nag Hammadi Scriptures: International Edition
- Segal, Alan F. (2002), Two powers in heaven: early rabbinic reports about Christianity and Gnosticism, BRILL
- Schaff (n.d.), Ante-Nicene Fathers Volume 1
- Turner, John (1986), "Sethian Gnosticism: A Literary History", Nag Hammadi, Gnosticism and Early Christianity
- Turner, John D. (1992), "Gnosticism and Platonism: The Platonizing Sethian texts from Nag Hammadi in their Relation to Later Platonic Literature", in Wallis, Richard T.; Bregman, Jay (eds.), Neoplatonism and Gnosticism, SUNY Press, ISBN 0-7914-1338-1, archived from the original on 2007-06-22
- Turner, John D. (2001), Sethian Gnosticism and the Platonic Tradition, Presses Université Laval
- Wisse, Frederik (1981), "Stalking those elusive Sethians", Studies in the History of Religions
