= Apocryphon of John =

Gnostic gospel

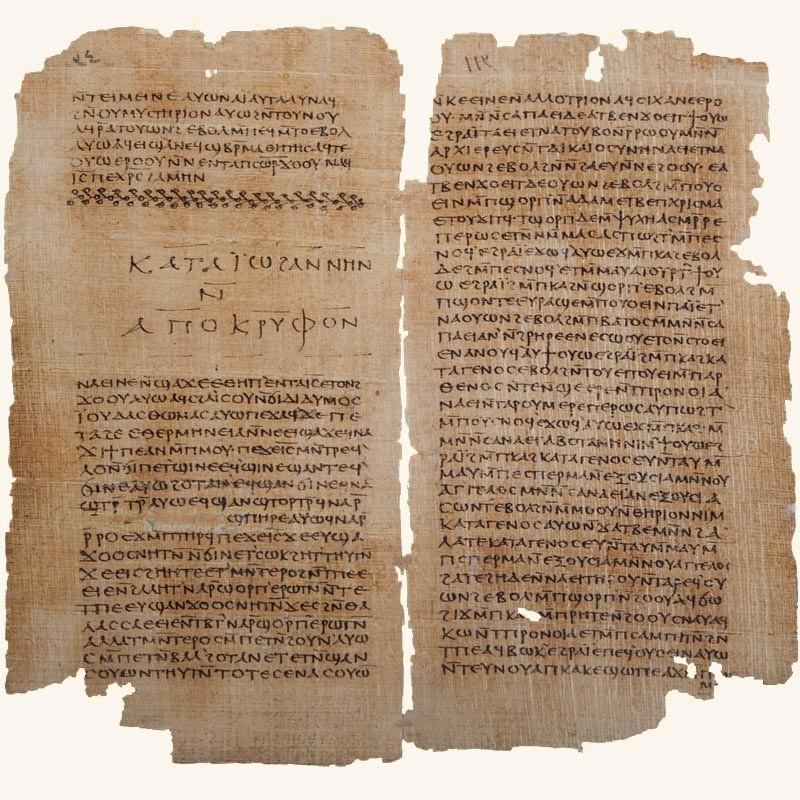
The Nag Hammadi manuscript of the Apocryphon of John (c. 330–350 AD), discovered in 1945.

The Apocryphon of John, also called the Secret Book of John or the Secret Revelation of John, is a 2nd-century Sethian Gnostic Christian pseudepigraphical text attributed to John the Apostle. It is one of the texts addressed by Irenaeus in his Christian polemic Against Heresies, placing its composition before 180 AD. It tells of the appearance of Jesus and the imparting of secret knowledge (gnosis) to his disciple John. The author describes it as having occurred after Jesus had "gone back to the place from which he came".

== Overview ==
Many second-century Christians, both Gnostic and orthodox, hoped to receive a transcendent personal revelation such as Paul the Apostle reported to the church at Corinth (2 Corinthians 12:1–4) or that John the Revelator claims to have experienced on the isle of Patmos, which inspired the Book of Revelation. As Acts narrates what happened after the time Jesus ascended to heaven, so the Apocryphon of John begins at the same point but relates how Christ reappeared to John.

The opening words of the Secret Book of John are, "The teaching of the saviour, and the revelation of the mysteries and the things hidden in silence, even these things which he taught John, his disciple." The author John is immediately specified as "John, the brother of James—who are the sons of Zebedee." The remainder of the book is a vision of spiritual realms and of the prior history of spiritual humanity.

There are four separate surviving manuscripts of "The Secret Book of John". One was purchased in Egypt in 1896 (the Berlin Codex) and three were found in the Nag Hammadi codices discovered in 1945. All date to the 4th century and are Coptic translations from Greek. Three appear to have been independently produced. Two of the four are similar enough that they probably were copied from a single source.

Although the different versions of the texts have minor variants (the Berlin Codex has many minor differences with Nag Hammadi II and IV), all texts generally agree on the assertion that the main revealing entity was Jesus.

== History ==
A book called the Apocryphon of John was referred to by Irenaeus in Adversus Haereses, written about 185, among "an indescribable number of secret and illegitimate writings, which they themselves have forged, to bewilder the minds of foolish people, who are ignorant of the true scriptures"—scriptures which Irenaeus himself helped to establish (see the canonical four). Among the writings he quotes from, in order to expose and refute them, are the Gospel of Truth, Gospel of Judas, and this secret book of John.

Little more was known of this text until an edition of it was discovered in an ancient Coptic Berlin Codex (BG 8502) acquired by Dr. Carl Reinhardt in Cairo in 1896. However, it would not be until the middle of the 20th century that it would be published. Carl Schmidt published a comparative study of the Apocryphon in the Codex with that described by Irenaeus in 1907, and then prepared an edition of the Coptic text, which was almost ready for publication in 1912 when a broken pipe in the printing house destroyed the whole run. Shortly before his death in 1938, Schmidt began work on an anastatic lithograph of the proofs; after some difficulty with his estate, the Coptic text finally saw print in 1938.

Walter Till then began work on a translation in 1941, but publication was delayed by World War II. After the war, Till became aware that three manuscripts of the Apocryphon in Coptic translated from the Greek were present in a cache of thirteen papyrus codices (bound books) that had been hidden away in the 4th century that had been fortuitously discovered at Nag Hammadi in Egypt (Nag Hammadi Codex II). He was permitted access to these manuscripts to prepare a critical edition. This edition finally saw print in 1955.

Two of the versions of the Apocalypse in the Nag Hammadi library are very similar and represent one manuscript tradition; they incorporate a lengthy excerpt from a certain Sethian Book of Zoroaster appended to the Apocryphon (as chapters 15:29–19:8f). Two shorter version of the Apocryphon (the one in the Berlin Codex and one found at Nag Hammadi) do not contain the interpolation, and constitute another manuscript tradition. All four versions found at Nag Hammadi have been used to produce the translations now available. The fact that four manuscript "editions" of this text survived—two "long" versions and two "short" versions—suggests how important this text was in early gnostic Christian circles. In the three Nag Hammadi codices the Apocryphon of John appears always in the first version.

== Influence ==
The Apocryphon, set in the framing device of a revelation delivered by the resurrected Christ to John the son of Zebedee, contains some of the most extensive detailing of classic dualistic Gnostic mythology that has survived. It is one of the principal texts of the Nag Hammadi library and an essential text in Gnosticism. Translator Frederick Wisse asserts that "The Apocryphon of John was still used in the eighth century by the Audians of Mesopotamia" (Wisse p. 104). The creation mythology it details has been studied by Carl Jung and Eric Voegelin.

== Texts ==
There are four surviving copies of The Secret Revelation of John. They are largely the same in their basic structure and content. The Berlin Codex and Nag Hammadi Codex III are shorter than the Nag Hammadi Codices II and IV. Another difference between codices is the portrayal of the Savior/Christ figure. While the Berlin Codex uses the term “Christ” frequently, the Nag Hammadi Codex III often uses the term “Lord” or “Savior” instead, and goes into greater detail about the descent of the Christ/Savior figure into the prison-world of Demiurge and of the Savior's power to reawaken and liberate mankind.

== Summary of the text and its cosmology ==
The following summary of the Apocryphon is derived from Wisse's translation.

The text begins with John describing his own state of grief and bewilderment after Christ's crucifixion. The Savior then appears, takes various forms, and after banishing John's fears, provides the following cosmological narrative.

The highest divine principle is the Monad. The Monad is described as a "monarchy with nothing above it". He is supreme, absolute, eternal, endless, perfect, holy and self-sufficient. However, his transcendent ineffability is also emphasized. He is neither quantifiable nor can his qualities ever truly be described. The Monad exists in inconceivable perfection.

The Monad produces from his thought a feminine divine entity or principle named Barbelo. She is described as "the first thought", and the "image" of the Monad. While Barbelo is always referred to as a "she", she is also described as both the primordial mother and father. She is also regarded as "the first man", "Holy Spirit", "Mother/Father", and described in various terms of androgyny. She is the first of a class of beings referred to as the Aeons, and an exchange between herself and the Monad brings the other Aeons into being. Additionally, the properties of Light and Mind are born from the Monad's reflection on Barbelo. Light is synonymous with Christ, also called "Christ the Autogenes". The Light and the Mind engage in further creative activity, aided by and glorifying the superior principles of Barbelo and the Monad. Together, they bring forth further Aeons and Powers.

Eventually, one of the Aeons, Sophia "of the Epinoia", disrupts the harmony of these processes by engaging in creative activity without the participation or consent of the Spirit of the Monad and without the aid of a male consort. The creative power of her thought produces an entity named Yaldabaoth, who is the first of a series of incomplete, demon entities called the Archons. Yaldabaoth is malevolent, arrogant, and has a grotesque form. His head is that of a lion while he possesses a serpentine body. Recognizing the deformed, imperfect nature of her offspring, Sophia attempts to conceal it somewhere where the other Aeons will not discover it. The act of hiding Yaldabaoth also has the result that Yaldabaoth himself remains ignorant of the upper world and the other Aeons.

Yaldabaoth is powerful enough to mimic the creative processes of the superior Aeons. He creates a whole host of other Archons, each of whom share his own deficient or malevolent character, and he creates a world for them to inhabit. This world is fundamentally inferior to the world above. It is fashioned out of darkness, but animated by light stolen from Sophia. The result is a world that is neither "light nor dark" but is instead "dim". In his arrogance and ignorance, Yaldabaoth declares himself the sole and jealous "God" of this realm.

Recognizing the imperfection of Yaldabaoth and his counterfeit world, Sophia repents. In forgiveness of her error, the Spirit of the Monad aids the other Aeons and Powers in an attempt to redeem Sophia and her creation. Yaldabaoth and his Archons hear the voice of the Monad's Spirit, and are terrified by the voice. The echo of the voice leaves a trace the Spirit's image on the waters that form the roof of their realm. The Archons decide to harness the power in the image for themselves, and attempt to create a copy of this image. As a result, the Archons create first human man, Adam.

Recognizing an opportunity to retrieve the light imprisoned in the darkness of Yaldabaoth and his world, Sophia and agents of the higher order, referred to variously as the "plenoria" or the "Epinoia", and later as the "pleroma", devise a scheme. They trick Yaldabaoth into blowing his own spiritual essence into Adam. This simultaneously animates Adam and empties Yaldabaoth of the portion of his being derived from Sophia.

Seeing the luminosity, intelligence, and general superiority of the now animate Adam, Yaldabaoth and the Archons regret their creation and do their best to imprison or dispose of him. Failing to do so, they then attempt to neutralize him by placing him in the Garden of Eden. In this narrative, the Garden of Eden is a false paradise where the fruit of the trees is sin, lust, ignorance, confinement, and death. While the Archons give Adam access to the Tree of Life, they conceal the Tree of Knowledge of Good and Evil, which is a manifestation of the forces of the pleroma and the Epinoia into Yaldabaoth's realm.

Christ reveals to John that it was he, Christ, who caused Adam to consume the fruit of the Tree of Knowledge. It is revealed that Eve is a helper sent by agents of the pleroma to help liberate the light imprisoned in Yaldabaoth's creation and in Adam. Eve is created when Yaldabaoth attempts to draw the light out of Adam, resulting in the creation of the female body. When Adam perceives her, he sees a reflection of his own essence and is freed from the bewitching power of Yaldabaoth.

The narrative then details Yaldabaoth's attempts to regain control over the essence of Light. His primary scheme is to initiate the activity of human reproduction, by which he hopes to create new human bodies inhabited by a counterfeit spirit. This counterfeit spirit allows Yaldabaoth and his Archons to deceive the human race, keeping them in ignorance of their true nature, and is the primary means by which Yaldabaoth keeps humanity in subjugation. This spirit is the source of all earthly evil and confusion, and causes people to die "not having found truth and without knowing the God of truth".

The narrative then takes a catechistic form as a series of questions and answers between John and the Savior. These address a number of subjects, but are largely soteriological in nature. John asks Christ who is eligible for salvation, and Christ responds with the answer that those who come in contact with the true Spirit will receive salvation, while those who are dominated by the counterfeit spirit will receive damnation. Christ also reveals his own role as a liberating agent of the higher realm, in this context. Christ, who describes himself as the "remembrance of the Pronoia" and "the remembrance of the pleroma", brings light into the darkness of Yaldabaoth's prison. Here, he rouses the prisoners to wakefulness and remembrance. Those who receive and are woken by Christ's revelation are raised up and "sealed… in the light of the water with five seals". They are thus spared from death and damnation. This aspect of Christ's role is elaborated on more fully by Nag Hammadi Codex III, while it is omitted from the Berlin Codex.

In conclusion, the Savior states that anyone who shares these revelations for personal profit will be cursed. The Nag Hammadi Codex III text ends with the prayer "Jesus Christ, Amen".

== Sources ==
- Davies, Stevan L (2006). The Secret Book of John: The Gnostic Gospel, Annotated and Explained. London: Darton Longman & Todd. ISBN 1-59473-082-2
- Gwynn, John (1897). The Apocalypse of St John, a Syriac version hitherto unknown. Dublin; London: Hodges Figgis & Co; Longman Green & Co.
- King, Karen (2006). The Secret Revelation of John. Cambridge: Harvard UP.
- Logan, Alastair H. B. 1996. Gnostic Truth and Christian Heresy. Based on the Apocryphon of John.
- Pagels, Elaine, 2003. Beyond Belief.
- Pearson, Birger A. (2007). Ancient Gnosticism: Traditions and Literature. Minneapolis: Fortress.
- Wisse, Frederick (1996). (1996) "The Apocryphon of John (II,1, III,1 IV,1, and BG 8502, 2)." In Robinson, James M., et al., eds. The Nag Hammadi Library in English. Leiden: Brill.
