= Three Steles of Seth =

Sethian Gnostic text

The Three Steles of Seth is a Sethian Gnostic text. It is the fifth tractate in Codex VII of the Nag Hammadi library. The writing is in Coptic and takes up the last nine pages of the codex.

== Background ==
A common theme in Sethian works is a descent or ascent theme. The Three Steles of Seth—along with Zostrianos, Allogenes, and Marsanes—uses the ascent pattern. Furthermore, these four Sethian texts are grouped together because of their extensive use of terminology from Platonic philosophy. Thus, the original work was likely written before Plotinus's Against the Gnostics in c. 265. The text lacks specifically Christian elements; the triadic nature of God is instead a Neoplatonic belief. Thus, the traditional two steles made of brick and stone are increased to three to represent the threefold divine: the Father, the mother Barbelo, and the son Autogenes.

== Summary ==
In the text, Seth uses the three steles to record three doxologies or hymns of praise. The text is framed as a revelation of Dositheos, who sees the steles inscribed by Seth.

=== Stele 1 ===
Stele one assumes the voice of Seth, and then of Seth together with Geradamas praising their respective creators. It is not entirely clear whether Hymn two is referring directly to the Barbelo or the “One”, though the title points to the Barbelo.

Hymn 1: Seth's Hymn to Pigeradamas (the Divine Adam) and Autogenes (the Self-Generated)

Emmakha Seth’s Praise of the Geradamas is, as the title indicates a hymn dedicating to the glorifying of Seth’s father, Geradamas, better known as Adamas, or Adam. The Hymn is from the perspective of Emmakha Seth, his spiritual archetype, and when he refers to Geradamas he is likewise referring to Adam’s spiritual archetype which resides in the lowest realm within Barbelo. He praises Geradams for creating him (Seth) and praises “god” for creating Geradamas. He praises the great self-originated aeon, Barbelo, for “staying in rest”, which is philosophical jargon for non-changing, stable being, as opposed to instability and the to-become. He continues on to refer to the Barbelo as engendered, existent, and glorified through intellect. There is a rather confusing excerpt from Verse 120:3 until the end of the first hymn:

And you derive from a foreign thing: and it presides over a foreign thing.
But now, you derive from a foreign thing: and it presides over a foreign thing.
You derive from a foreign thing: for you are [dissimilar].

The “foreign thing” here refers to the Invisible Parent, that is, the highest being in the gnostic mythology that the Barbelo was created from. A Sethian of the gnostic race would consider themselves a foreigner, born of foreigners (those within Seth’s immovable race). The actual lineage the author is likely referring to is that Adam, was derived from Barbelo, who resides over Adam, Seth, and the rest of the lower realms, while Barbelo itself was derived from the Invisible Parent. The word dissimilar was only partially preserved.

Hymn 2: Communal Hymn to Barbelo

Praise of the Barbelo takes on the voice of both Geradamas and Seth who are jointly praising Barbelo since this is ultimately where they derive from and where they reside in their spiritual archetype forms. Up until this point the Barbelo aeon is spoken of as being constructed of three distinctive realms, but in line 19 the author refers to the Barbelo as having been divided into “The quintet”, referring to The Apocryphon of John model of Barbelo. The following line even mentions that Barbelo has been given to them in “Triple powerfulness”, indicating the two structures given are not necessarily mutually exclusive. The hymn continues to praise Barbelo as emanating from the superior realm and for the sake of the inferior realm in which we live, Barbelo resides in between our realm and the Invisible Parent. The rest of the hymn continues the trend of praising the Barbelo as perfect and immanent.

=== Stele 2 ===
Stele 2 assumes the collective voices of Seth and Geradams in praise of the Barbelo.

Hymn 3: Praise of the Barbelo begins on the Second Stele and continues to praise Barbelo as both Seth and Geradamas, beginning with “Masculine, Virgin, first aeon…” Verse 121:20 This hymn tends to focus more on the Barbelo and its prominent role being a self-reflection of the One.

You are One belonging to the One: and you derive from its shadow

— Verse 122:12

The hymn focuses on the authority that the Barbelo has as well as its qualities including, vitality, goodness, blessedness, and understanding.

Hymn 4: Petition to Barbelo to the parent praises the Barbelo as the parent to the knowable universe, wisdom (Sophia), and truth. Here again, the threefold structure is referenced numerous times, as is its eternal nature. The Hymn seems to be concerned with knowing the Barbelo better, as the authors seem to be yearning to better know the Barbelo.

Hymn 5: Thanksgiving to the Barbelo is easily the shortest of the Hymns and is the final Hymn on the Second Stele. It roughly reads, “You have heard!… You have Saved!...We give thanks! We praise Always! We will glorify you!” As the title indicates, this section serves as a thanks to the Barbelo for acquainting itself with the Immovable Race.

=== Stele 3 ===
Stele 3 assumes the collective voice of the immovable race of the Gnostics, offspring of Seth.

Hymn 6: Collective thanksgiving and petition to Barbelo the parent Begins the third Stele and begins with a rhythm that is very reminiscent of the fifth Hymn. This Hymn, while continuing the trend of praise for the great parent Barbelo is also much more contemplative than the previous Hymns. It attempts to make more claims about the Barbelo and how only it knows itself, through itself. This hymn also takes on the voice of more than just Seth and Adam (“We all Praise you”)

Hymn 7: Collective Thanksgiving to the Barbelo adopts the same plurality of voice as the sixth hymn and this time discusses their salvation through means of intellect bestowed by the Barbelo. The trends of the Barbelo being contained within itself, being before and after itself, and generally a superior glorified being continue in this final hymn. The nature of the actual wording of the final two Hymns couples with the plural voice seems to indicate that these Hymns are specifically suited for use within a large congregation of gnostics in order to thank the Barbelo for salvation through knowledge.

Dositheus’s Directions for Use of the Hymns: The Mystical Ascent

This final section refers to the mystical ascent of the soul back to the Pleroma within Barbelo described in Zostrianos. The Silence referred to is the climax moment of contemplation in ascension, where the soul resides in the third and highest realm within Barbelo, at which point the descension back to the first realm where Adam and Seth reside begins, blessing the other realms on the way down. The text indicates that those who remember and recite the tablets and always glorifies the Barbelo will ascend to the Pleroma, where they rightly should be.
