= Audianism =

Sect of Christians in 4th century in Syria and Scythia

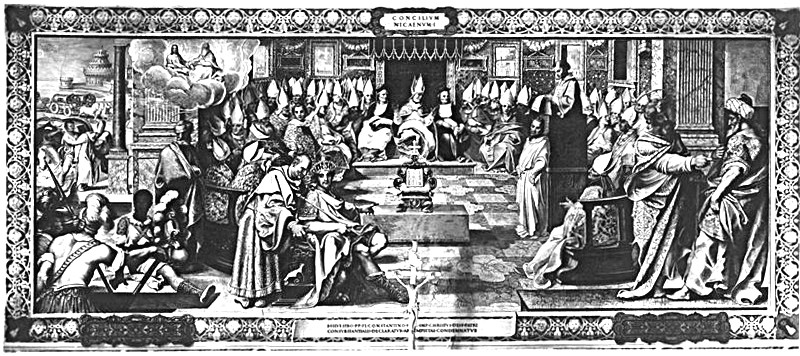
A fresco depicting the Council of Nicaea in 325 condemning the Audiani

Audianism, or Anthropomorphism, was a sect of Christians in the 4th century in Syria and the Pontic–Caspian steppe, named after its founder Audius or Audaeus, who interpreted the text of the First Epistle to Timothy 3:16 to mean that God created man in his image in a literal physical sense.

== Beliefs ==
The distinguishing beliefs and practices included both theological anthropomorphism and quartodecimanism.

- Anthropomorphism holds that God has human form. Audius took the text of Genesis 1:27 literally and held that God created humans to resemble his physical form.
- Quartodecimans honoured the death of Jesus on the eve of Passover instead of following the Roman tradition of celebrating Easter on a Sunday.

== History ==
Audius lived in Syria in the 4th century. His views extended into Scythia. Towards the end of the 4th century, the opinion of the Audians appeared among some African Christians.

In 325 at the First Council of Nicaea, it was decreed that all Christians should follow the Roman tradition of celebrating Pascha (Easter) on Easter Sunday, and no longer on the date of 14 Nisan (the Jewish Passover), as the so-called Quartodecimans used to do. The Audians, however, continued the Quartodeciman practice.

Epiphanius of Salamis called attention to the Audians (as well as other sects he considered heretical) in his Panarion. Although Epiphanius is not always a trustworthy source, he correctly quotes the viewpoint of the Audians, that the church had "abandoned the fathers' Paschal rite in Constantine's time from deference to the emperor, and changed the day to suit the emperor".

Roman Emperors Constantine I the Great and Theodosius I legislated against the Audians, but the sect was still practicing quartodecimanism in Syrian Antioch in the 380s.

The Church Father Theodoret wrote on the belief the following, as Chapter IX of his Ecclesiastical History (Book IV), titled "Of the heresy of the Audiani":

The illustrious emperor thus took heed of the apostolic decrees, but Audaeus, a Syrian alike in race and in speech, appeared at that time as an inventor of new decrees. He had long ago begun to incubate iniquities and now appeared in his true character. At first he understood in an absurd sense the passage "Let us make man in our image, after our likeness." From want of apprehension of the meaning of the divine Scripture he understood the Divine Being to have a human form, and conjectured it to be enveloped in bodily parts; for Holy Scripture frequently describes the divine operations under the names of human parts, since by these means the providence of God is made more easily intelligible to minds incapable of perceiving any immaterial ideas. To this impiety Audaeus added others of a similar kind. By an eclectic process he adopted some of the Manichean doctrines of Manes and denied that the God of the universe is creator of either fire or darkness. But these and all similar errors are concealed by the adherents of his faction.

They allege that they are separated from the assemblies of the Church. But since some of them exact a cursed usury, and some live unlawfully with women without the bond of wedlock, while those who are innocent of these practices live in free fellowship with the guilty, they hide the blasphemy of their doctrines by accounting as they do for their living by themselves. The plea is however an impudent one, and the natural result of Pharisaic teaching, for the Pharisees accused the Physician of souls and bodies in their question to the holy Apostles "How is it that your Master eateth with publicans and sinners?" and through the prophet, God of such men says "Which say, 'come not near me for I am pure' this is smoke of my wrath." But this is not a tithe to refute their unreasonable error. I therefore pass on to the remainder of my narrative.

== Anthropomorphism ==
Other early Christian writers such as Melito of Sardis, Tertullian, Origen and Lactantius were also accused of anthropomorphism.

Anthropomorphism was revived in northern Italy during the 10th century but was effectually suppressed by the bishops, notably by Ratherius, bishop of Verona.

In modern times, Benny Hinn has also been accused of teaching a form of anthropomorphism.

== Academic knowledge ==
In reality, very little is known about Audians, perhaps they had some Gnostic traditions. It is not known whether Audians were Quartodecimans or just protopaschites. Their anthropomorphism was "metaphorical", i.e. centered upon a purely mental image, and not upon a physically concrete representation of God.

== See also ==
- Anthropotheism

== Sources and references ==
- Nicene and Post-Nicene Fathers, Second Series, Volume 3, Edited by Philip Schaff and Henry Wace, 1892 - on Newadvent.org - Church fathers
