= Autogenes =

Gnostic deity of Barbelo

In Sethian Gnosticism, Autogenes (Meaning "Self-Born One" in Greek) is an emanation or son of Barbelo (along with Kalyptos and Protophanes according to Zostrianos). Autogenes is mentioned in Nag Hammadi texts such as Zostrianos, The Three Steles of Seth, Allogenes the Stranger, and Marsanes.

Autogenes in Gnosticism is roughly parallel to the Platonic soul.

== See also ==
- Aeon (Gnosticism)
- Plato's theory of soul
