= Zostrianos =

Sethian Gnostic text

Zostrianos is a Sethian Gnostic text. It is the first tractate of two in Codex VIII of the Nag Hammadi library. It takes up 132 of the 140 pages in the codex, making Zostrianos the longest tractate of the entire library. However the text is extensively damaged, especially in the center, making the document difficult to fully understand. The Coptic manuscript is a translation of a Greek original, likely written in Alexandria in c. 200 AD. In the text, Zostrianos goes on a heavenly journey and receives divine knowledge from the aeons.

The work is likely the same Zostrianos that Porphyry criticized in Life of Plotinus. Like other Sethian Gnostic texts Marsanes, Allogenes, and Three Steles of Seth, its ideas appear more Middle Platonic or Neoplatonic than Christian. However, Porphyry said that these works belonged to Christian heretics. Bentley Layton explains this apparent contradiction with the belief that Zostrianos was written by a Gnostic Christian author who was fascinated with Eastern religious heroes who had special knowledge relating to the divine, such as Zoroaster.

== Summary ==
Zostrianos, writing in first person, introduces the text as eternally living words written for the living elect. He rejects material and psychic associations and searches for a place of repose for his spirit outside of the perceptible world. He experiences an initial vision of the perfect child and ponders the relationship between the ideal and phenomenal worlds, but despite diligent attempts to find answers, he is unable to do so. In his despair, he seeks a violent death in the desert but is visited by the angel of the knowledge of eternal light, who tells him that he is a chosen person and that he can be saved. The angel offers to guide Zostrianos to the world of light.

Zostrianos departs from his earthly body with a luminous cloud, which guides him through the atmospheric realm and past the aeonic copies to the self-generated aeons. He undergoes six baptisms of repentance, becoming a contemplative angel, an angel of masculine gender, a holy angel, and a perfect angel. In each of the baptisms, he stands upon a different aeon and blesses the divine Autogenes, the forefather Pigeradamas, and various other figures. Zostrianos seeks to know the single reality underlying the different levels of the cosmos and receives instructions on how to do so.

Authrounios offers to explain realms below the self-generated Aeons, including the atmospheric realm, the Aeonic Copies, and the world which does not truly exist. Zostrianos joins the aeons he has traversed. Authrounios explains the origin of the physical cosmos, stating that the atmospheric realm was created by a rational principle to manifest generated and perishable things for the sake of the advent of great judges, lest they be enclosed in the creation. When Sophia contemplated the stars, she emitted the darkness, fleeing what is subject to the Archon. The Archon saw a reflection and created the world, but the image belonging to Sophia is always corrupt and deceptive. Zostrianos responds, and the section concludes with the restoration of Sophia and the explanation of the Aeonic Copies and the illumination of souls.

The pre-existent principles are three in number and appeared from a single origin of the Barbelo aeon. These principles have manifested every principle and empowered every power, and are existence, blessedness, and life. The text then mentions the three perfect baptismal waters: water of life, water of blessedness, and water of existence. The text highlights that these waters are likenesses and forms of the Triple-Powered One, that flows from the pure water, and that they exist together with the essence and existence of being. The text further explains the generation of determinate being and how it received enlightenment and stable being through baptism. One who knows how he exists and what the living water is lives within knowledge.

The text describes the descent of various spiritual entities, which are incorporeal, undivided, and spiritually pure, but also without compulsion. Their path of ascent is pure and imperishable, and they are associated with different baptisms that lead to eternal life. Glories are appointed to guard those who are truly baptized in knowledge, and various baptisms are appointed for those who strip off the world and lay aside nature. Through knowledge and purification, one can approach unity and be filled with Holy Spirit. The text also mentions the Triple Powered Invisible Spirit and the powers of the Spirit, which can be revealed through silent thought and meditation.

The text discusses various types of souls and their level of attainment in different aeons. The first type of soul is the incarnate soul, which is divided into those that have perished and those that are within their time. There are differences among souls, but they are parts of things that endure. The second type is the disincarnate soul in the sojourn, which does not have self-generated power and follows the ways of others. The third type is the disincarnate soul in the repentance, which has three classes: those who have committed all sins and have repented, those who have partially sinned or only intended to sin. The fourth type is the self-generated ones, who have a rational expression of the ineffable truth and eternal life. The four exist as rational expressions of truth and knowledge, and they belong not to Protophanes but to the Mother. The four lights, Armazel, Oroiael, Daveithe, and Eleleth, exist as rational expressions of truth and knowledge. Furthermore, Adam is the perfect human, an eye of Autogenes, and it is his knowledge that knows the divine Autogenes.

The text talks about the negative and positive prospects for souls in the self-generated Aeons. It highlights that the Aeons are immeasurable, and souls that only attain some of them will fall away from the perfect Aeons and that it is possible to consolidate every form of one's immortal soul. Additionally, there is nothing eternal, and every form is formless, uncreated, and without any shape. The text mentions the aeonic levels and waters below the self-generated Aeons. These aeons have other waters, including those of the archons. Additionally, the text mentions the triple male child and the three sub-aeons of the Barbelo aeon. The triple male child is a form of the divine Autogenes and is a power of Barbelo, and the sub-aeons are those of the knowledge of the truth.

The text describes five types of people and their prospects for salvation. Mortality is said to necessitate salvation for all humans. The first type of person is materialistic, with a dead soul, mind, and body, and they suffer and are consumed by demons. The second type is materialistic but has an immortal soul, and they forget their eternal god and associate with daimons. The third type, the sojourners, are far from wicked deeds if they possess an inward discovery of truth. The fourth type is the one that repents, renounces dead things, and desires immortal mind and soul, and they can receive another conception and every attainment. The fifth and most powerful type is the saved person who has grasped the image that changes in every situation and can become divine. Zostrianos offers up praise to God and asks Ephesech for wisdom about the dispersion of the saved type of person and who is mixed with and divided from them.

Some souls need help to escape reincarnation, and if not, they will keep descending into generation and becoming speechless due to the clutches of the body. To avoid this fate, there are specific powers appointed for salvation. These powers are perfect living concepts that will save whoever receives them, passing through the world and every aeon. Additionally, the text describes the Self-generated Aeons as eternal lights that possess a variety of beauty, trees, plants, human beings alive with every species, immortal souls, every shape and species of intellect, gods of truth, angels dwelling in great glory with an indissoluble body, and ingenerate offspring with unchanging perception. These Aeons are perfect and individually complete, and at each aeon, there is a living earth, a living water, luminous air, and an unconsuming fire.

Zostrianos explains that being baptized five times by the powers of Autogenes caused him to become divine. Zostrianos stood upon the fifth aeon, where he saw all those belonging to Autogenes, including those who truly exist. Zostrianos sees all the Self-generated Aeons and describes being immersed five times by several powers, including Yesseus Mazareus Yessedekeus. Zostrianos approaches the Aeon of Protophanes, and the text mentions the appearance of Youel, who explains the crowns and seals that empower every spirit and soul. The text also describes the seals of the four kinds and the triple-classes, belonging to the Invisible Spirit.

Zostrianos is baptized in living water by Youel and receives power, form, light, and a holy spirit. Youel takes Zostrianos to the great aeon where he sees the invisible child within an invisible light. Youel baptizes Zostrianos again in living water and he becomes able to see in the presence of the great and perfect Self-generated ones. Youel tells Zostrianos that he has received all the baptisms that are fitting, and he should call upon Salamex, Semen, and the all-perfect Armê, the luminaries of the Barbelo Aeon, to reveal to him those of the invisible great perfect male Protophanes and the ingenerate Kalyptos, and teach him about the virginal Barbelo aeon and the Invisible Triple Powered Spirit.

Zostrianos is anointed by greater glories than powers. He receives a revelation from Salamex and Semen about the One, a unity that existed prior to all things and is more powerful than any genus or species. The One is a pure unknowable power and has three powers of the Spirit: complete Existence, Life, and Blessedness. The Spirit is a single, perfect, and simple Spirit who is everything and everywhere. In contrast, there is the one who comes to be in Mentality and Life. It is from the Spirit that all things pre-exist.

The text describes the emergence of Barbelo aeon from the triple-powered spirit. Barbelo is a power that inhabits a part of the ingenerateness and exists eternally, seeking after the Triple-Powered Spirit. Barbelo lacks the unity of the Triple-Powered Spirit, but she became distinct and perfect because she is an all-perfect instance of contemplation. She is the offspring that supplements the Triple-Powered Spirit, and has a pre-potency, even the primal ingenerateness succeeding that one, because with respect to all the rest she is a first aeon. The entire Spirit becomes a unity in existence and act, even a simple Triple Powered One, an Invisible Spirit, an image of the one that truly exists. Barbelo strives to unite with the image of the Triple-Powered Spirit, but is unable to do so, and becomes incognizant, eventually existing individually.

(Pages 96-113 are damaged beyond comprehension.)

The text describes different aspects of existence in the Kalyptos Aeon, including angels, daimons, souls, living creatures, trees, bodies, and the elements of air, water, earth, and number, among others. There are also different powers, wholes, and genera that exist, with some being holy and eternal, while others are changeless and incorruptible. The beings in the Kalyptos Aeon exist in unity and are filled with the aeon that truly exists. Some of them exist essentially, while others are quasi-essential. There is an incorporeal essence with an imperishable body, and an unconsuming and indestructible fire. The Four Luminaries of the Kalyptos Aeon are named as Arme, Diphaneus, Aphredon, and Solmis. Various sub-aeons and luminaries within Protophanes and Autogenes are also named.

Zostrianos continues wondering about the Triple Powered Invisible perfect Spirit and its existence. Apophantes and Aphropais lead him to Protophanes, where he unites with the Kalyptos aeon, the virginal Barbelo, and the Invisible Spirit, becoming all-perfect and empowered. Zostrianos returns to the Self-generated Aeons and receives a true image. He comes back down to the perceptible world and preaches the truth, empowering and nullifying a multitude of disgraces that brought him near death. In the final part, Zostrianos urges the holy seed of Seth to awaken their divine aspect, seek the immutable ingenerateness, and choose the salvation of masculinity by choosing the light over darkness.

== Divine hierarchy ==
Zostrianos features a complex divine hierarchy.

=== Triple-Powered Invisible Spirit ===
The Triple-Powered Invisible Spirit is the highest-level deity. He has three powers:

1. Existence
2. Vitality or Life
3. Blessedness or Mentality

=== Barbelo Aeon ===
These three powers of the Triple-Powered Invisible Spirit give rise to the aeon Barbelo, which has three sublevels or sub-aeons that represent three distinct phases in the unfolding of the Barbelo Aeon:

1. Kalyptos ("Hidden One"), the first and highest subaeon within the Aeon of Barbelo, representing the initial latency or potential existence of the Aeon of Barbelo.
2. Protophanes ("First Appearing One"), the second highest subaeon, is called a great perfect male Mind and respresents the initial manifestation of the Barbelo Aeon.
3. Autogenes ("Self-Generated"), the self-generated actualization of the Barbelo Aeon, is the lowest of the three subaeons.

In turn, there are four luminaries for each of these three powers (or subaeons).

The Triple-Male Child is a savior or mediator in the Barbelo Aeon who brings undifferentiated beings in the Aeon of Protophanes into differentiated existence in the Aeon of Autogenes, and also helps them to ascend back to the Aeon of Protophanes.

=== Self-Generated Aeons ===
The Self-Generated (Autogenes) Aeons contain most of the divine beings that are typically associated with the Sethian baptismal rite:

- the Living Water (Yesseus Mazareus Yessedekeus)
- the baptizers: Micheus and Michar (and Mnesinous)
- the purifier: Barpharanges
- Seldao
- Elenos
- Zogenethlos

The Self-Generated Aeons also contain the Four Luminaries:

1. Sophia
2. Mirothea, the consort of Autogenes and mother of the archetypal Adam, Pigeradamas
3. Prophania, the mother of the heavenly Seth and of the Four Luminaries
4. Plesithea, mother of the seed of Seth, called "the angels"

The Four Luminaries established by Autogenes, from highest to lowest, are:

1. Armozel (or Harmozel): dwelling of Adamas
2. Oroiael: dwelling of (Emmacha) Seth
3. Daveithe: dwelling of the seed of Seth
4. Eleleth: dwelling of Sophia and the repentant souls of later generations.

Sophia does not give birth to the archon of creation, but shows a model of the material world, of which he sees only a dim reflection of while looking downwards. The archon of creation creates the material world based on this reflection.

=== Lower aeons ===
The lower aeons are:

- Repentance, which has six sub-aeons for different types of sins
- Sojourn

Below these are the lower realms:

- The Aeonic Copies form a lower realm or purgatory. This realm contains the orbiting planets and probably also the fixed stars.
- The atmospheric realm or "the airy earth" forms the atmosphere between the Earth and the planets.
