= Baptism in early Christianity =

Baptism has been part of Christianity from the start, as shown by the many mentions in the Acts of the Apostles, the Pauline epistles, the gospel according to St. Matthew, the first epistle of St. Peter, the longer ending of Mark and the Didache.

== Background in Jewish ritual ==
Although the term "baptism" is not today used to describe the Jewish rituals (in contrast to New Testament times, when the Greek word baptismos did indicate Jewish ablutions or rites of purification), the purification rites (or mikvah—ritual immersion) in Jewish law and tradition are similar to baptism, and the two have been linked. In the Hebrew Bible and other Jewish texts, immersion in water for ritual purification was established for restoration to a condition of "ritual purity" in specific circumstances. For example, Jews who (according to the Law of Moses) became ritually defiled by contact with a corpse had to use the mikvah before being allowed to participate in the Temple in Jerusalem. Immersion in the mikvah represents a change in status in regards to purification, restoration, and qualification for full religious participation in the life of the community, ensuring that the cleansed person will not impose uncleanness on property or its owners.

== New Testament ==
The New Testament includes several references to baptism as an important practice among early Christians and, while giving no actual account of its institution by Jesus, portrays him as giving instructions, after his resurrection, for his followers to perform the rite (see Great Commission). It also gives interpretations by the Apostle Paul and in the First Epistle of Peter of the significance of baptism.

Truly, truly, I say to you, unless one is born of water and the Spirit, he cannot enter the kingdom of God

— John 3:5 RSV

Christ loved the church and gave himself up for her, that he might sanctify her by the washing of water with the word, that he might present the church to himself in splendor, without spot or wrinkle or any such thing, that she might be holy and without blemish.

— Ephesians 5:25–27 RSV

God's patience waited in the days of Noah, during the building of the ark, in which a few, that is, eight persons, were saved through water. Baptism, which corresponds to this, now saves you

— 1 Peter 3:20–21 RSV

=== Baptism of Jesus ===
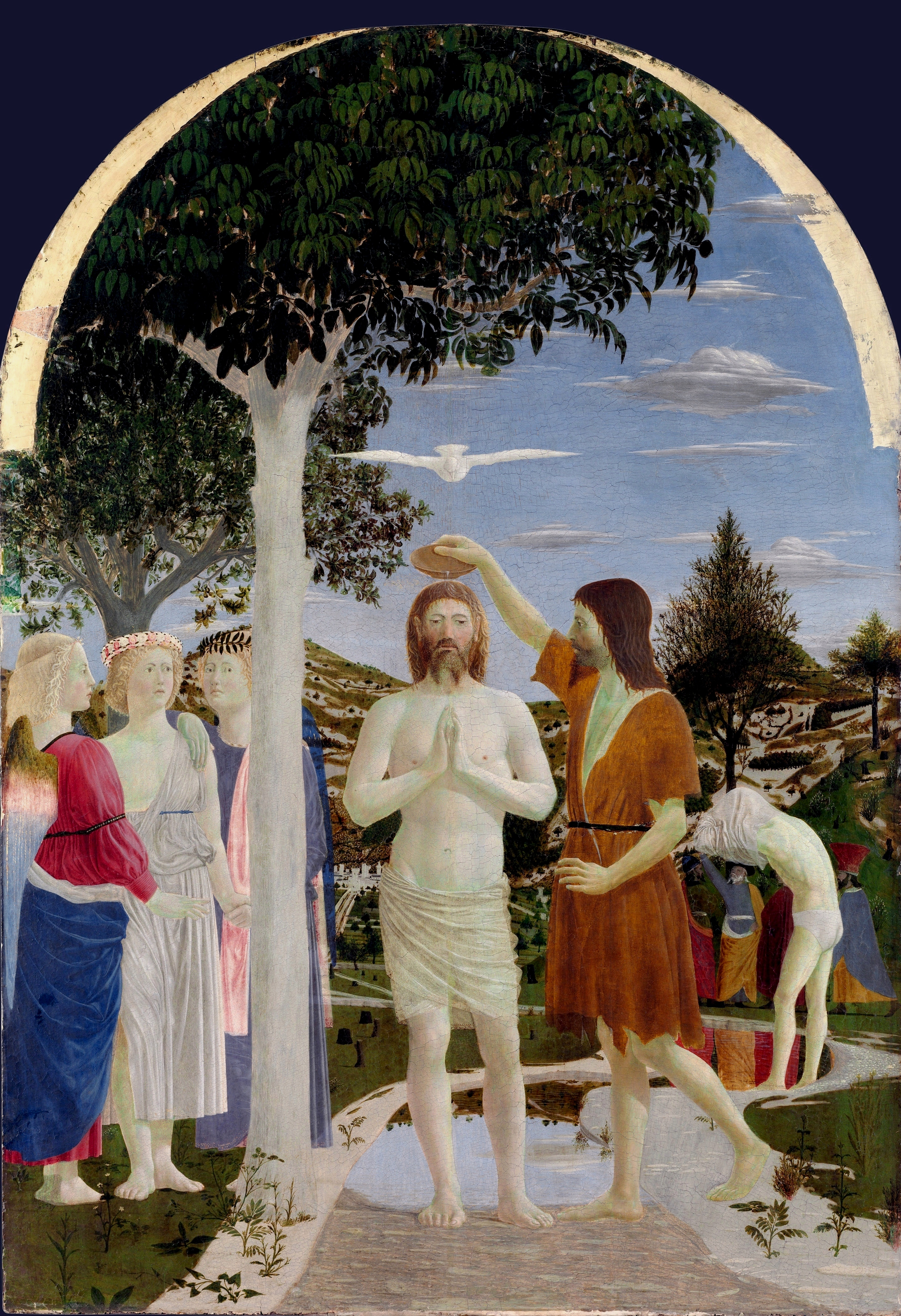
The Baptism of Christ, 1450 (National Gallery, London).

The baptism of Jesus is described in the gospels of Matthew, Mark and Luke. John's gospel does not directly describe Jesus' baptism.

John the Baptist was a 1st-century mission preacher on the banks of the River Jordan. He baptized Jews for repentance in the River Jordan.

At the start of his ministry, Jesus was baptized by John the Baptist. Critical scholars broadly agree that the baptism of Jesus is one of the most authentic, or historically likely, events in the life of the historical Jesus. Christian baptism has its origin in the baptism of Jesus, in both a direct and historical sense. Many of the earliest followers of Jesus were people who, like him, were baptized in the Jordan by John the Baptist.

=== Baptism by Jesus ===
The Gospel of John states that Jesus at an early stage led a mission of baptism that drew crowds. John 4:2, considered by many scholars to be a later editorial insertion, denies that Jesus himself baptized and states that he did so only through his disciples.

Some prominent scholars conclude that Jesus did not baptize. Gerd Theissen and Annette Merz assert that Jesus did not baptize, detached the notion of repentance from baptism, recognized John's baptism, and put forward a purity ethic in tension with baptism. The Oxford Dictionary of World Religions also states that Jesus did not baptize as part of his ministry.

E. P. Sanders omits John's account of Jesus' baptizing mission from his portrait of Jesus as a historical figure.

Robert W. Funk considers the account of Jesus' baptism ministry in John to have internal difficulties: that, for instance, it reports Jesus coming to Judea even though he is already in Jerusalem and thus in Judea. John 3:22 actually speaks of Jesus and his disciples coming, not "εἰς τὴν Ἰουδαίαν" (into Judea), but "εἰς τὴν Ἰουδαίαν γῆν" (into the Judean countryside), which some interpret as contrasted with Jerusalem, the scene of the encounter with Nicodemus described immediately before. According to the Jesus Seminar, the passage about Jesus "coming to Judea" (as they interpret "εἰς τὴν Ἰουδαίαν γῆν") to lead a mission of baptism probably preserves no historical information (a "black" rating).

On the other hand, the Cambridge Companion to Jesus takes a different view. According to this source, Jesus accepted and made his own John the Baptist's message of repentance, forgiveness and baptism; taking over from John, when the latter was imprisoned, he called for repentance and for baptism as a first step in accepting the imminent Kingdom of God; and the central place of baptism in his message is confirmed by the passage in John about Jesus baptizing. After John's execution, Jesus ceased baptizing, through he may have occasionally returned to the practice; accordingly, while baptism played an important part in Jesus' ministry before John's death and again among his followers after his resurrection, it had no such prominence in between.

New Testament scholar Raymond E. Brown, a specialist in the Johannine writings, considers that the parenthetic editorial remark of John 4:2 that Jesus baptized only through his disciples was intended to clarify or correct the twice repeated statement in the preceding verses that Jesus did baptize, and that the reason for its insertion may have been that the author considered the baptism that the disciples administered to be a continuation of the Baptist's work, not baptism in the Holy Spirit.

Other New Testament scholars also accept the historical value of this passage in John. This is the view expressed by Joel B. Green, Scot McKnight, I. Howard Marshall. Another states that there is "no a priori reason to reject the report of Jesus and his disciples' conducting a ministry of baptism for a time", and mentions that report as one of the items in John's account "that are likely to be historical and ought to be given due weight".

In his book on the relationship between John the Baptist and Jesus of Nazareth, Daniel S. Dapaah says that John's account "may be a snippet of historical tradition", and comments that the silence of the Synoptic Gospels does not mean that the information in John was invented, and that Mark's account also suggests that Jesus worked with John at first, before moving to Galilee. Frederick J. Cwiekowski agrees that the account in John "gives the impression" that Jesus baptized.

The Joseph Smith Translation of the Bible says that "though he [Christ] himself baptized not so many as his disciples; 'For he suffered them for an example, preferring one another.'

The Gospel of John remarks, in John 3:32, that, though Jesus drew many people to his baptism, they still did not accept his testimony, and the Jesus Seminar concludes, on the basis of Josephus's accounts, that John the Baptist likely had a larger presence in the public mind than Jesus.

=== Paul's epistles ===
In the Pauline epistles baptism effects and represents the believer's union with Christ, a union by which the believer shares in Christ's death and resurrection; cleanses of sin; incorporates into the Body of Christ and makes one "drink of the Spirit."

The conception of a sacramental principle, widespread not only in the Greco-Roman world, but even in pre-Columbian America and in preliterate societies, took on a unique significance, and to Paul's influence is attributed an interpretation given to the Christian rite in terms of the Greco-Roman mysteries but little weight can be attached to the counterparts of baptism in mystery religions as an explanation of the Christian practice.

=== Gospel of Matthew ===
Matthew 3:11–17; Matthew 28:18–20

Matthew (Note: Matthew is listed first in every complete (undamaged) extant canon of the New Testament scriptures of the first five centuries CE, hence the two-millennia-old tradition of presenting the Gospel of Matthew first in the order of the books in the Christian New Testament, a usage preserved today by every major Christian denomination and by every major Bible book printer and publisher world-wide. It is first here in accordance with tradition. Nevertheless, some scholars dispute the primacy of the Gospel of Matthew.) begins with the "generation" of Jesus as Son of David, followed by the visit of the gentile Magi, and the flight into Egypt to escape Herod, after whose death the Holy Family returns into the land of Israel, then moves to Nazareth, and then includes a detailed version of the preaching of John the Baptist, followed by the baptism of Jesus. John protests to Jesus that he needs to be baptized by Jesus, but Jesus tells him to let it be so now, saying that it is fitting for the two of them ("for us") to thus "fulfill all righteousness." When Jesus is baptized, he goes up immediately out of the water, the heavens open and John sees the Spirit of God descend upon him like a dove, alighting on him, and he hears a voice from heaven say, "This is my beloved Son, with whom I am well pleased."

Later, at the request of the mother of James and John, who prompted her to present their request to him to declare that they are to sit one at his right hand and the other at his left, Jesus speaks of the "cup" he is to drink, and he tells them that they too will drink of his cup, but in Matthew's gospel Jesus does not explicitly state that the baptism with which he must be baptized is also the "cup" that he must drink.

The Gospel of Matthew also includes the most famous version of the Great Commission. Here, the resurrected Jesus appears to the apostles and commissions them to make disciples of all nations, to baptize, and teach. This commission reflects the program adopted by the infant Christian movement.

=== Gospel of Mark ===
Mark 1:1–11

This gospel, today generally believed by scholars to be the first (Note: The primacy of Mark is disputed. The witnesses of the first five centuries unanimously supported the primacy of the Gospel of Matthew, a position undisputed for 1,700 years until the beginning of the 19th. The subject of Matthean vs. Marcan primacy is outside the scope and intent of this article. For further discussion: see "Augustinian hypothesis," "Two-gospel hypothesis," "Jewish-Christian Gospels," "Gospel of Matthew," "Christianity in the 1st century," "Synoptic problem," "Aramaic primacy," and most particularly the textual footnotes and References lists citing names and titles of works by various authors together with the External Links to sources provided—far too many for a comprehensive listing here.) and to have been used as a basis for Matthew and Luke, begins with Jesus' baptism by John, who preached a baptism of repentance for forgiveness of sins. John says of Jesus that he will baptize not with water but with the Holy Spirit. At Jesus' baptism, he hears God's voice proclaiming him to be his Son, and he sees the spirit like a dove descend on him.

During Jesus' ministry, when James and John ask Jesus for seats of honor in the coming kingdom, Jesus likens his fate to the cup that he will drink and to the baptism with which he must be baptized, the very cup and baptism in store for John and James (that is, martyrdom).

Mark 16:19–20

The traditional ending of Mark is thought to have been compiled early in the 2nd century, and initially appended to the gospel by the middle of that century. It says that those who believe and are baptized will be saved, "but he who does not believe will be condemned." Mark's gospel does not explicitly state that baptized persons who believe will be saved from the "wrath to come," the wrath to which John the Baptist refers in Matthew's gospel, but readers can infer that being "condemned" includes the "wrath to come".

=== Gospel of Luke ===
Luke 3:21–22; Luke 24:45–47

This gospel begins with a statement that it contains reliable information obtained directly from the original eyewitnesses and servants of the word. It introduces the conception of John the Baptist, the annunciation of Gabriel to Mary the virgin, the birth of the Baptist who will be called the prophet of the Most High, and then the birth of Jesus, in the days of Herod, king of Judea, and of Caesar Augustus, emperor of the Roman Empire. There follows the account of Jesus in the Temple among the teachers; and then the calling and preaching of the prophet John the Baptist in the days of emperor Tiberius Caesar, of tetrarchs Herod and Philip, of high priests Annas and Caiaphas, and then by far the briefest account in the canonical Gospels of the baptism of Jesus.

The baptism of John is different from the baptism of the one who is to come after him. Jesus declares later that he has another baptism to be baptized with, and that he is under constraint (he is straitened) until it is accomplished. The petition of the mother of James and John, the personal request of James and John, and Jesus' declaration to them that they will be baptized as he will be baptized, and will drink the cup that he will drink, is not in Luke's gospel.

In the Gospel of Luke, the risen Jesus appears to the disciples and the eleven apostles gathered together with them in Jerusalem and gives them the Great Commission without explicitly speaking of baptism, but readers can infer that "the forgiveness of sins" here includes "baptism" according to the preaching of the apostles at the time of Luke's gospel.

=== Gospel of John ===
The Gospel of John mentions John the Baptist's baptizing activity, in particular his baptism of Jesus, and his statement that Jesus would baptize with the Holy Spirit. It also mentions baptizing activity by Jesus, specifying that the baptizing was not done by Jesus himself but by his disciples.

Some references to water in John's Gospel have been interpreted as referring to baptism, in particular, the phrase "born of water and the Spirit" and the account of blood and water coming out of the side of Jesus when pierced after crucifixion

=== Acts ===
Acts of the Apostles, written c. 85–90, states that about 3,000 people in Jerusalem were baptized in one day on Pentecost. It further relates baptisms of men and women in Samaria, of an Ethiopian eunuch, of Saul of Tarsus, of the household of Cornelius, of Lydia's household, of the Philippi jailer's household, of many Corinthians and of certain Corinthians baptized by Paul personally.

In Acts, the prerequisites of baptism are faith and repentance, but in certain cases (like Cornelius' household) the reception of the Spirit also precedes baptism.

Also in Acts, some twelve men who had undergone John's baptism, a "baptism of repentance" that John administered, "telling the people to believe in the one who was to come after him, that is, Jesus", were baptized "in the name of the Lord Jesus", whereupon they received the Holy Spirit.

Acts 2:38, Acts 10:48 and Acts 19:5 speak of baptism "in the name of Jesus Christ" or "in the name of the Lord Jesus", but whether this was a formula that was used has been questioned.

== Apostolic Age ==
The sources of early Christian tradition related to Baptism are:

- Hermas, Pastor (PG 2, 892–1024).
- Justin Martyr, First Apology (PG 6, 327–440).
- Iranaeus, Adversus Haereses (PG 7, 433–1224).
- Tertullian, De baptismo (PL 1, 1197–1222).
- Cyril of Jerusalem, Catecheses et Catecheses mystagogicae quinque (PG 33, 331–1131).
- Egeria, Itinerarium (PLS 1, 1045–1092).
- John Chrysostom, Catecheses II ad illuminandos (PG 49, 223–240).
- Ambrose of Milan, De Mysteriis (PL 16, 405–426).
- –, De Sacramentis (PL 16, 435–482).
- Augustine of Hippo, De baptismo (PL 43, 107–244).

There is a scholarly consensus that the earliest Christian baptism was by immersion Thomas Schreiner likewise states that "Most scholars agree that immersion was practiced in the NT", identifying submersion as the form of immersion practiced. Heyler says most New Testament scholars generally agree that Christian baptism in the New Testament era was by immersion. Everett Ferguson similarly speaks of "general scholarly agreement" that the baptism commanded by Jesus was immersion in water by dipping, in the form of a "full bath". He describes medieval depictions of Jesus standing in water while John poured water over him as a "strange fantasy" deriving from later church practice. Di Berardino describes the baptism of the New Testament era as generally requiring total immersion, Tischler says that total immersion seems to have been most commonly used, and Lang says "Baptism in the Bible was by immersion, that is, the person went fully under the waters". Sookey says it is "almost certain" that immersion was used. The Global Dictionary of Theology says that it is probable that immersion was the early church's normal mode of baptism, but that it was not seen as an important issue.

The Didache or Teaching of the Twelve Apostles, an anonymous book of 16 short chapters, is probably the earliest known written instructions, outside of the Bible, for administering baptism. The first version of it was written c. 60–80 AD. The second, with insertions and additions, was written c. 100–150 AD. This work, rediscovered in the 19th century, provides a unique look at Christianity in the Apostolic Age and is the first explicit reference to baptism by pouring, although the New Testament does not exclude the possibility of this practice." Its instructions on baptism are as follows:

Now about baptism: this is how to baptize. Give public instruction on all these points, and then baptize in running water, in the name of the Father and of the Son and of the Holy Spirit... If you do not have running water, baptize in some other. If you cannot in cold, then in warm. If you have neither, then pour water on the head three times in the name of the Father, Son, and Holy Spirit. Before the baptism, moreover, the one who baptizes and the one being baptized must fast, and any others who can. And you must tell the one being baptized to fast for one or two days beforehand. (Note: A more literal translation is Didache, Catholic planet, "Now concerning baptism, baptize thus: Having first taught all these things, baptize ye into the name of the Father, and of the Son, and of the Holy Spirit, in living water. And if thou hast not living water, baptize into other water; and if thou canst not in cold, then in warm (water). But if thou hast neither, pour [water] thrice upon the head in the name of the Father, and of the Son, and of the Holy Spirit. But before Baptism let the baptizer and the baptized fast, and any others who can; but thou shalt command the baptized to fast for one or two days before", Philip Schaff's translation. Other translations are given at Early Christian Writings.)

Commentaries typically understand that the Didache indicates a preference for baptizing by immersion. in "living water" (i.e., running water, seen as symbolic of life). Furthermore, in cases of insufficient water it permits pouring (affusion), which it differentiates from immersion, using the Greek word ekcheō, ("pour", in the English translation) and not baptizō ("baptize", in the English translation), while at the same time considering the action done by pouring to be a baptism, giving no hint that this form made the baptism any less valid, and showing that immersion was not the only baptismal practice then acceptable. Barclay observes the Didache shows that baptism in the early church was by total immersion, if possible, Barton describes the immersion of the Didache as "ideally by total immersion", and Welch says it was by "complete immersion".

James V. Brownson notes that the Didache does not specify either immersion or pouring when using running water, and Sinclair B. Ferguson argues that really the only mode that the Didache mentions is affusion. Martin and Davids say the Didache envisages "some form of immersion", and the Oxford Dictionary of the Christian Church refers its readers to its entry on immersion, which it distinguishes from submersion and affusion.

== Early Christianity ==
=== Theology ===
The theology of baptism attained precision in the 3rd and 4th centuries. While instruction was at first given after baptism, believers were given increasingly specific instructions before being baptized, especially in the face of heresies in the 4th century. By the 4th and 5th centuries, a series of rites spread over several weeks led up to the actual baptism at Easter: catechumens attended several meetings of intensive catechetical instruction, often by the bishop himself, and often accompanied by special prayers, exorcisms, and other rites. Catechumens recited the Creed on Holy Saturday to show that they had completed their catechetical instruction. At dawn following the Paschal Vigil starting the night of Holy Saturday, they were taken to the baptistry where the bishop consecrated the water with a long prayer recounting the types of baptisms. The catechumens disrobed, were anointed with oil, renounced the devil and his works, confessed their faith in the Trinity, and were immersed in the font. They were then anointed with chrism, received the laying on of hands, clothed in white, and led to join the congregation in the Easter celebration. By then, postponement of baptism had become general, and a large proportion of believers were merely catechumens (Constantine was not baptized until he was dying); but as baptisms of the children of Christians, using an adaptation of the rite intended for adults, became more common than baptisms of adult converts, the number of catechumens decreased.

As baptism was believed to forgive sins, the issue of sins committed after baptism arose. Some insisted that apostasy, even under threat of death, and other grievous sins cut one off forever from the Church. As indicated in the writings of Saint Cyprian, others favoured readmitting the "lapsi" easily. The rule that prevailed was that they were readmitted only after undergoing a period of penance that demonstrated sincere repentance.

What is now generally called the Nicene Creed, longer than the text adopted by the First Council of Nicaea of 325, and known also as the Niceno-Constantinopolitan Creed because of its adoption in that form by the First Council of Constantinople in 381, was probably the baptismal creed then in use in Constantinople, the venue of the 381 Council.

=== Mode of baptism ===
Scholars "generally agree that the early church baptized by immersion", but sometimes used other forms. Howard Marshall says that immersion was the general rule, but affusion and even sprinkling were also practised. His presentation of this view has been described by Porter and Cross as "a compelling argument". Laurie Guy says immersion was probably the norm, but that at various times and places full immersion, partial immersion and affusion were probably in use.

It is disputed where immersion was necessarily total. Tischler and the Encyclopedia of Catholicism say that the immersion was total. The same encyclopedia of Roman Catholicism notes that the preference of the Early Church was total immersion in a stream or the sea or, if these were not available, in a fountain or bath-sized tank, and Eerdman's Handbook to the History of Christianity says that baptism was normally by immersion, without specifying whether total or partial. The Dictionary of the Bible (2004) says "Archaeological evidence from the early centuries shows that baptism was sometimes administered by submersion or immersion... but also by affusion from a vessel when water was poured on the candidate's head...". In one form of early Christian baptism, the candidate stood in water and water was poured over the upper body. Baptism of the sick or dying usually used means other than even partial immersion and was still considered valid. Internet-available illustrations of ancient Christian representations of baptism from as early as the 2nd century include those in CF Rogers, Baptism and Christian Archeology, the chapter "The Didache and the Catacombs" of Philip Schaff's The Oldest Church Manual Called the Teaching of the Twelve Apostles, and Wolfrid Cote's The Archaeology of Baptism.

==== Studies before 1950 ====
In The Archaeology of Baptism (1876) Wolfrid Cote, quoting Prudentius, who in his Psychomachia spoke of the "bathed chests" of the baptized, and the views of two earlier Italian archaeologists, stated that "the primitive mode appears to have been this: The administrator and candidate both standing in the water the former placed his right hand on the head of the candidate, and, pronouncing the baptismal words, gently bowed him forward, till he was completely immersed in the water". He included in his book a woodcut of a fresco in the Catacomb of San Callisto (a photographic reproduction appears in this article), and reported that one archaeologist interpreted it as a youth being baptized by affusion, while for another the youth standing in the water was "immersed in a cloud of water". Cote described this painting as of great antiquity, probably of the 4th or 5th century, while remarking that it is impossible to ascertain the precise age of the pictures in the catacombs of Rome. The other paintings that Cote described are of much later periods, while the mosaic in the Baptistery of San Giovanni in Fonte, in Ravenna (erected in the 4th century), which shows John baptizing Jesus by pouring water on his head from a cup, Cote explained as the product of later restoring. The font in this baptistery Cote described as ten feet in diameter and three and a half feet deep. Cote listed 67 still existing Italian baptisteries dating from the 4th to the 14th centuries, all of which he understood to have been used for total immersion. He made no mention of any pre-Constantine evidence.

In 1903 Clement F Rogers published "Baptism and Christian Archaeology". This was a study of the archaeological evidence, both the positive evidence that paintings and carvings on sarcophagi etc. provide about how baptism actually was conferred, and the negative evidence given by the structure of baptismal fonts on how it could not have been conferred. He used literary sources plentifully but merely for illustration. For the first three centuries (i.e. before the time of Constantine) direct archaeological evidence is limited to pictures of baptism in the catacombs of Rome. Rogers concluded that "the direct evidence from archaeology alone may not be conclusive to show that in pre-Constantinian times baptism by affusion only was practiced generally or indeed in any one single case; but it does show that there was nothing repugnant in it to the general mind, that no stress was laid on total immersion, that the most important moments were held to be those when water was poured over the catchumen, and when the minister laid his hand on his head. This, taken in connexion with the known customs of later ages, make it more than probable that the usual method of administration was by affusion only." Taking into account the positive archaeological evidence of post-Constantinian times, Roger concludes: "All the evidence of archaeology goes to prove that the essential part of baptism was considered in the early Church to be the pouring of water over the candidate's head by the bishop, or the guiding his head under a descending stream, followed by the laying on of hands"; he adds: "There remains the question, whether this was preceded by a self-immersion". To answer this question, he examines the negative evidence of ancient baptismal fonts, especially those found in archaeological sites, providing on pp. 347–49 a Synoptic Table of Fonts, with date, shape, diameter and depth, showing that some of them could not have been intended for full immersion.

In his "Churches Separated from Rome" (1907), Louis Duchesne responded to accusations by Eastern Orthodox that the Roman Catholic was corrupted because of "the Filioque, baptism by affusion, unleavened bread, &c.", by pointing to the absence of any ancient representation of baptism that showed the neophyte actually being immersed totally.

==== Studies in the second half of the 20th century ====
Alois Stenzel's 1958 study of baptism with a focus on liturgy argued that both immersion and affusion were practised by the early Church, since some baptismal pools which have been uncovered were too shallow for baptism and pictorial evidence favoured affusion.

"Baptism in the Early Church" by George Rice (1981), in "Bible and Spade", cited Cote with favour and claimed that archaeology "overwhelmingly testifies to immersion as the normal mode of baptism in the Christian church during the first ten to fourteen centuries". Rice cites in particular imagery in the Catacomb of San Ponziano and a crypt in the catacomb of Santa Lucina, as well as a 9th- or 10th-century fresco in the basilica of San Clemente he also states that "pictures of Jesus standing in water while John pours water over His head are of a much later date than those depicting immersion and they demonstrate the change in the mode of baptism that came into the church". He mentions a 4th-century baptistery sufficiently large for immersion, Rice says that archaeological evidence demonstrates some early baptismal fonts large enough for adult immersion were later made smaller or replaced, to accommodate affusion baptism of infants, leading to mistakes in the dating of art works by 20th-century studies.

In his contribution to the 1986 11th International Archaeology Congress on "What do the texts teach us on the equipment and furnishings needed for baptism in southern Gaul and northern Italy?" Jean-Charles Picard concluded that the texts speak only of immersion and that the area has no archaeological images of baptism by pouring water on the head.

In 1987, on the basis of archaeology and parallels with Jewish practice, Sanford La Sor considered it likely that total immersion was also Christian practice.

In the same year, Lothar Heiser, in his study of baptism in the Orthodox Church, concluded on the basis of the literary and pictorial evidence in that field that "the water customarily reached the hips of the baptizand; after calling on the triune God, the priest bent the baptizand under so as to dip him in water over the head; in the cases of pouring in the Didache and in sickbed baptism the baptized did not stand in the font"; but acknowledges that in present Greek practice the priest places the infant being baptized as far down in the water as possible and scoops water over the head so as to cover the child fully with water.

In 1995, Renate Pillinger concluded from the evidence provided by images and buildings and by some literary sources that it was usual for the baptizand to stand in water no more than hip-deep and for the baptizer to pour water over him.

With regard to the shallow baptismal fonts that archaeologists had discovered, Malka Ben Pechat expressed in 1999 the view that full immersion was possible even in small fonts with a mere 60 centimetres (2 feet) of water, while the fonts that were even shallower were intended for the baptism of infants.

==== 21st-century studies ====
In the close of his comprehensive 2009 study, Baptism in the Early Church, Everett Ferguson devoted four pages (457–60) to summarizing his position on the mode of baptism, expressed also in his The Church of Christ of 1996, that the normal early-Christian mode of baptism was by full immersion.

He observed that "those who approach the study of baptism from the standpoint of archaeology tend to find greater probability that affusion, or perfusion was a normal practice; those who come from the literary evidence see a greater likelihood of immersion, or submersion, being the normal practice"; but he intended his own comprehensive survey to give coherence to the evidence (p. 857). Ferguson dismissed Rogers' 1903 study as dated with regard to both the depictions of baptism and his survey of the baptismal fonts.

Like Rice, whom he did not mention, Ferguson said that the size of the baptismal fonts was progressively reduced in connection with the prevalence of infant baptism, although there are a few cases where larger fonts are later than the smaller ones. Ferguson also stated: "The predominant number of baptismal fonts permitted immersion, and many were so large as to defy any reason for their existence other than immersion".

Robin Jensen writes: "Historians have sometimes assumed that baptism was usually accomplished by full immersion – or submersion – of the body (dunking). However, the archaeological and iconographic evidence is ambiguous on this point. Many – if not most – surviving baptismal fonts are too shallow to have allowed submersion. In addition, a significant number of depictions show baptismal water being poured over the candidate's head (affusion), either from a waterfall, an orb or some kind of liturgical vessel." Eerdman's Dictionary of the Bible also casts doubt on "the usual assumption that all NT baptisms were by immersion", stating that some early baptisteries were deep enough to stand in but not broad enough to lie down in, and mentioning that ancient representation of Christ at his baptism show him standing in waist-deep water. The immersion used by early Christians in baptizing "need not have meant full submersion in the water" and, while it may have been normal practice, it was not seen as a necessary mode of baptism, so that other modes also may have been used. Submersion, as opposed to partial immersion, may even have been a minority practice in early Christianity.

== See also ==
=== Related articles and subjects ===
- Baptism of desire
- Chrismation
- Christifideles
- Conditional baptism
- Consolamentum
- Divine filiation
- History of baptism
- Jesus' Name doctrine
- Masbuta
- Prevenient Grace
- Sacrament
- Theophany

=== People and ritual objects ===
- Baptismal font
- Chrism
- Holy water
- Holy water in Eastern Christianity

== Bibliography ==
- Bockmuel, Markus, ed. (2001), The Cambridge Companion to Jesus, Cambridge: Cambridge University Press, ISBN 978-0-521-79678-1.
- Cote, Wolfrid (1876), The Archaeology of Baptism, Read Books Design, ISBN 9781445599786.
- Cross, Frank Leslie; Livingstone, Elizabeth A (2005), The Oxford Dictionary of the Christian Church (3rd rev ed.), Oxford: Oxford University Press, ISBN 0-19-280290-9, OCLC 58998735.
- Dapaah, Daniel S (2005), The Relationship between John the Baptist and Jesus of Nazareth: A Critical Study, Washington, DC: University Press of America, ISBN 0-7618-3109-6, OCLC 60342941
- Duchesne, Louis (1907), Churches Separated from Rome.
- Dyrness, William A; Kärkkäinen, Veli-Matti, eds. (2008), Global Dictionary of Theology, Intervarsity Press, ISBN 978-0-8308-2454-0.
- Ferguson, Everett (1996), The church of Christ: a biblical ecclesiology for today, Wm. B. Eerdmans, ISBN 978-0-8028-4189-6.
- ——— (2009), Baptism in the early church: history, theology, and liturgy in the first five centuries, Eerdmans, ISBN 978-0-8028-2748-7.
- Funk, Robert W. (1998), The Acts of Jesus: The Search for the Authentic Deeds of Jesus, San Francisco: Harper, ISBN 0-06-062978-9, OCLC 37854370.
- Old, Hughes Oliphant (1992), The Shaping of the Reformed Baptismal Rite in the Sixteenth Century, Grand Rapids, MI: William B Eeerdmans, ISBN 978-0-8028-2489-9.
- Rice, George (1981), "Baptism in the Early Church", Bible and Spade, 10 (2).
- Rogers, Clement F (2006) [Oxford, 1903], "Baptism and Christian Archeology", Studies in Biblical and Patristic Criticism: or Studia Biblica & Ecclesiastica, vol. 5, Gorgias Press, ISBN 978-1-59333-465-9.
- Schreiner, Thomas (2007), Believer's Baptism: Sign of the New Covenant in Christ.
- Tomson, Peter J (2001). "Jesus and His Judaism". In Bockmuehl, Markus (ed.). The Cambridge Companion to Jesus. Cambridge: Cambridge University Press. p. 27. ISBN 0-521-79678-4..
- Turner, Paul (2000), Hallelujah Highway, Liturgy Training Publications, ISBN 978-1-56854-320-8.
