= History of baptism =

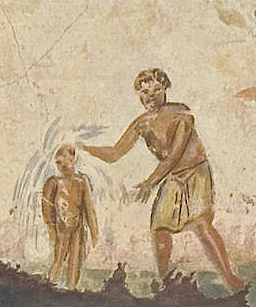
One of the earliest depictions of baptism, Catacombs of San Callisto, third century

John the Baptist, who is considered a forerunner to Christianity, used baptism as the central sacrament of his messianic movement. Christians consider Jesus to have instituted the sacrament of baptism. The earliest Christian baptisms seem to have been done either by immersion or by pouring water on the head three times. By the third and fourth centuries, baptism involved catechetical instruction as well as chrismation, exorcisms, laying on of hands, and recitation of a creed. In the West, affusion became the normal mode of baptism between the twelfth and fourteenth centuries, though immersion was still practiced into the sixteenth. In the sixteenth century, Martin Luther retained baptism as a sacrament, but Swiss reformer Huldrych Zwingli considered baptism and the Lord's supper to be symbolic. Anabaptists denied the validity of infant baptism, which was the normal practice when their movement started and practiced believer's baptism instead. Several groups related to Anabaptism, notably the Baptists and Dunkards, soon practiced baptism by immersion as following the Biblical example.

== Background in Jewish ritual ==
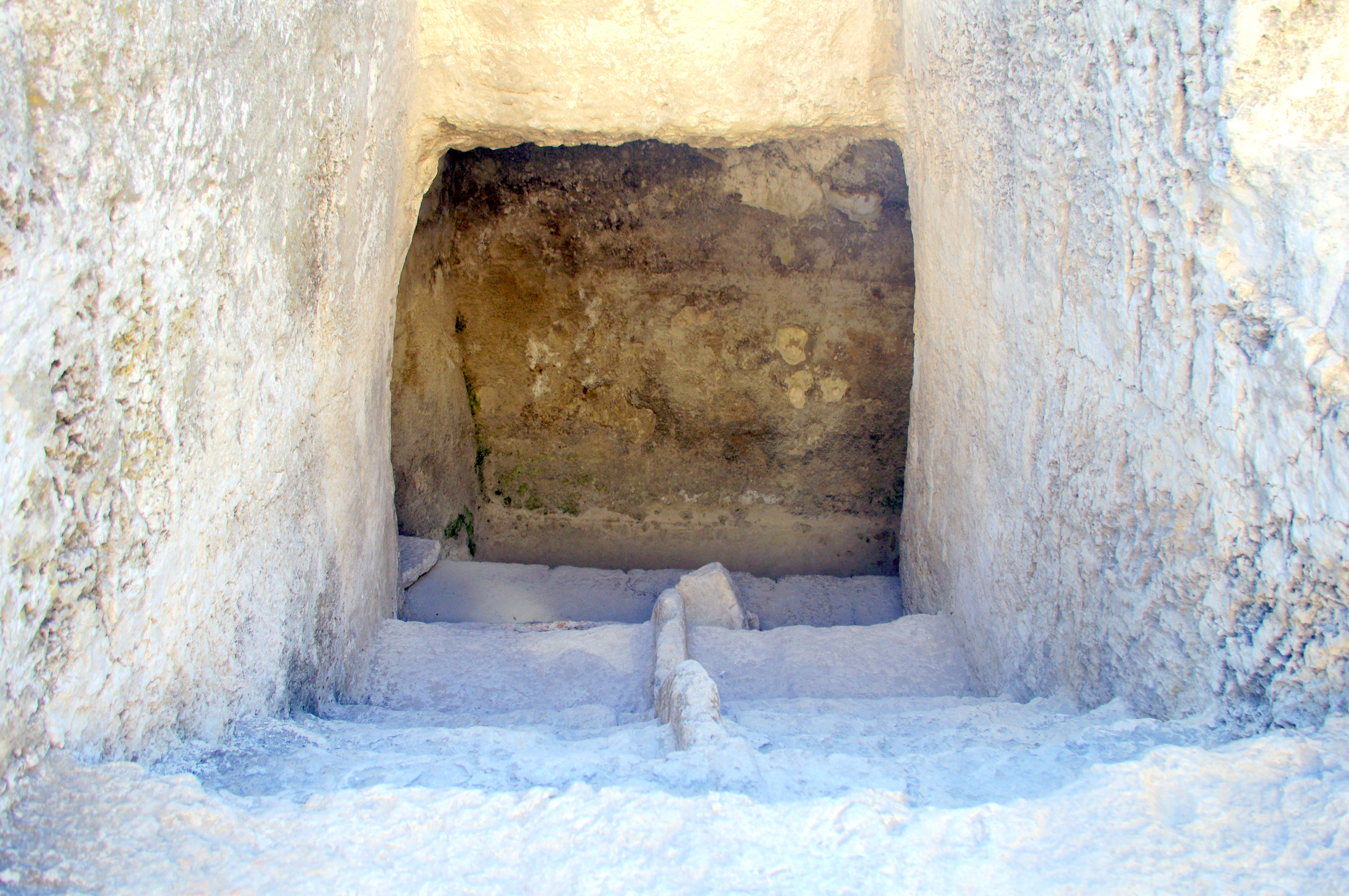
An ancient Mikveh (bath used for ritual immersion in Judaism) on the Temple Mount in Jerusalem

Although the term "baptism" is not used to describe the Jewish rituals, the purification rites in Halakha, Jewish law and tradition, called tevilah, have some similarity to baptism, as ritual washing was prescribed in the Hebrew Bible in connection with various forms of impurity, such as those described in Leviticus 15. The tevilah is the practice of immersion in a ritual bath known as a mikveh or in natural bodies of water, including rivers. In the Hebrew Bible and other Jewish texts, immersion in water for ritual purification was established for restoration to a condition of "ritual purity" in specific circumstances. For example, Jews who (according to the Law of Moses) became ritually defiled by contact with a corpse, as described in Numbers 19, had to use the mikveh before being allowed to participate in the Holy Temple. Immersion is required for converts to Judaism. Immersion in the mikveh represents a change in status with regard to purification, restoration, and qualification for full religious participation in the life of the community, ensuring that the cleansed person will not impose uncleanness on property or its owners. It did not become customary, however, to immerse converts to Judaism until after the Babylonian Captivity (586–539 BCE). This change of status by the mikveh could be obtained repeatedly, while Christian baptism, like circumcision, is, in the general view of Christians, unique and not repeatable. Even the so-called rebaptism by some Christian denominations is not seen by them as a repetition of an earlier valid baptism and is viewed by them as not itself repeatable.

During the Second Temple period (c. 516 BCE–70 CE), the Greek noun baptismos was used to refer to ritual washings in Hellenistic Judaism.

== Hemerobaptists ==
Hemerobaptists (Heb. Tovelei Shaḥarit; 'Morning Bathers') were an ancient religious sect that practiced daily baptism. They were likely a division of the Essenes. In the Clementine Homilies (ii. 23), John the Baptist and his disciples are mentioned as Hemerobaptists. The Mandaeans have been associated with the Hemerobaptists on account of both practicing frequent baptism and Mandaeans believing they are disciples of John.

== Mandaeans ==
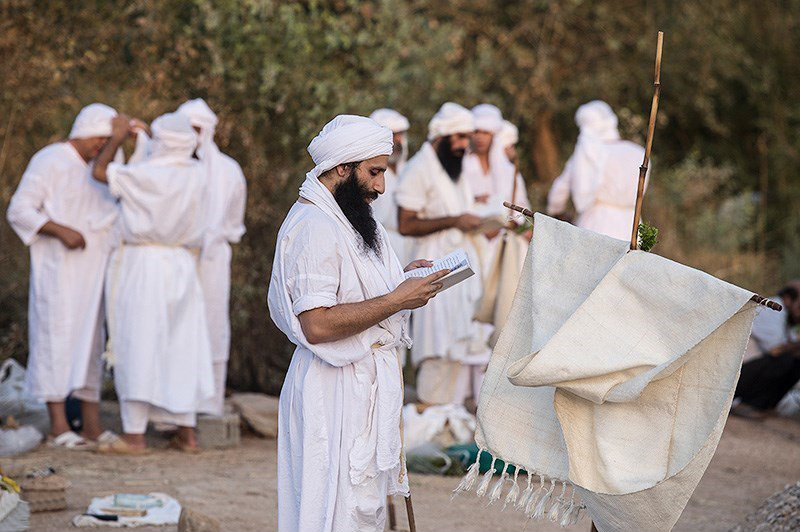
Mandaeans in prayer during baptism

Mandaeans revere John the Baptist and practice frequent full immersion baptism (masbuta) as a ritual of purification, not of initiation. Mandaeans abhor circumcision and are possibly the earliest people to practice baptism and may have originated Gnosticism. Early religious concepts and terminologies recur in the Dead Sea Scrolls, and yardena (Jordan) has been the name of every baptismal water in Mandaeism. The Mandaic language is a dialect of southeastern Aramaic with Palestinian and Samaritan Aramaic, as well as Akkadian influences and is closely related to Syriac and especially Jewish Babylonian Aramaic. They formally refer to themselves as Nasurai (Nasoraeans). According to Mandaean sources such as the Haran Gawaita, the Nasurai inhabited the areas around Jerusalem and the River Jordan in the 1st century AD.

== Elkesaites ==
The Elkesaites were a Judeo-Christian baptismal sect that originated in the Transjordan and were active between 100 and 400 CE. The members of this sect, like the Mandaeans, performed frequent baptisms for purification and had a Gnostic disposition. The sect is named after its leader Elkesai.

== Sethians ==
The Sethians were one of the main currents of Gnosticism during the 2nd and 3rd century CE. According to John D. Turner, it originated in the 2nd-century CE as a fusion of two distinct Hellenistic Judaic philosophies and was influenced by Christianity and Middle Platonism. The Sethian baptismal rite is known as the Five Seals, in which the initiate is immersed five times in running water. According to Buckley (2010), "Sethian Gnostic literature ... is related, perhaps as a younger sibling, to Mandaean baptism ideology."

== Valentinians ==
Valentinianism was one of the major Gnostic Christian movements. Founded by Valentinus in the 2nd century CE, its influence spread widely, not just within Rome but also from Northwest Africa to Egypt through to Asia Minor and Syria in the East. A Mandaean baptismal formula was adopted by Valentinian Gnostics in Rome and Alexandria in the 2nd century CE.

== Early Christianity ==
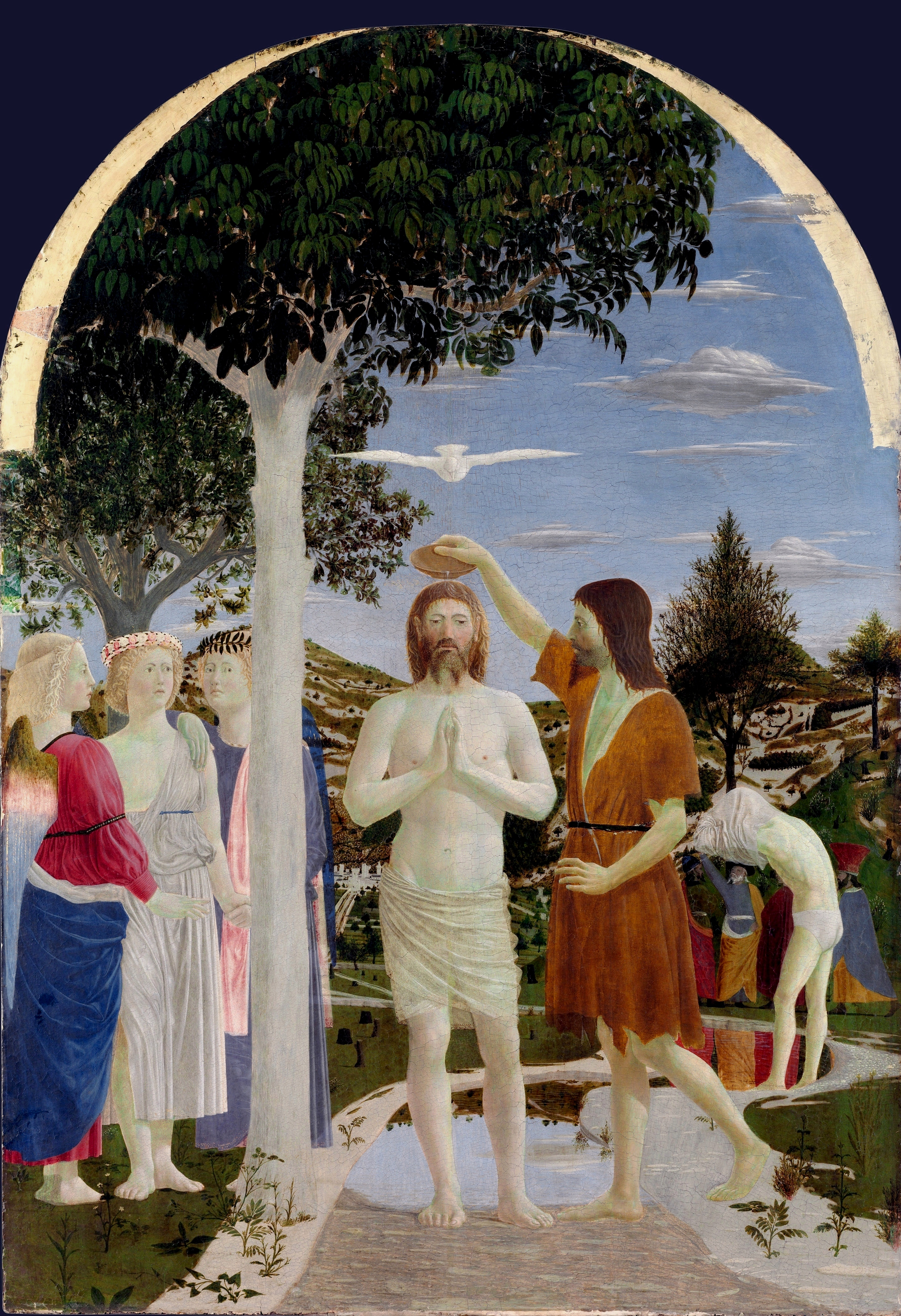
The Baptism of Christ, 1450 (National Gallery, London).

John the Baptist adopted baptism as the central sacrament in his messianic movement, seen as a forerunner of Christianity.

Baptism has been part of Christianity from the start, as shown by the many mentions in the Acts of the Apostles and the Pauline epistles. Christians consider Jesus to have instituted the sacrament of baptism. How explicit Jesus' intentions were and whether he envisioned a continuing, organized Church is a matter of dispute among scholars.

There is a scholarly consensus that the earliest Christian baptism was normally by immersion, or at least that this is probable. (Note: Sookey says it is "almost certain" that immersion was used; and the Global Dictionary of Theology says that it is probable that immersion was the early church's normal mode of baptism, but that it was not seen as an important issue.) Some interpret this as meaning total immersion or submersion beneath the water. Among those who take this view are Thomas Schreiner, Everett Ferguson, Di Berardino, Tischler, and Lang. Others understand immersion as not necessarily implying submersion beneath the water. Kirsten Marie Hartvigsen distinguishes between immersion and submersion and considers both as possible early-Christian forms of baptism, as does Christian Strecker. Laurie Guy says: "The church most likely practiced full immersion, partial immersion and affusion at various times and places in the early centuries, with sprinkling being practiced rarely (and probably only for medical reasons) during that time period." Robin M. Jensen describes the early Christian baptismal ritual as having for basis "immersion in water (or a thorough soaking by pouring)", and describes the primitive, first-century ritual as having encompassed both "application of water (whether by immersion or by some other means) and an imposition of hands", adding that "'Baptism' originally conveyed the sense of water's application (if not also immersion) in its very definition". Other recent studies that see total immersion (submersion) as not the only form of baptism utilized by early Christians include Steven J. Schloeder, Charles Thomas, Stanley J. Grenz, and also the Oxford Dictionary of the Christian Church, and the Oxford Dictionary of the Bible.

The theology of baptism attained precision in the 3rd and 4th centuries. While instruction was at first given after baptism, believers were given increasingly specific instructions before being baptized, especially in the face of heresies in the 4th century. By the fourth and fifth centuries, baptism had become a several-week-long rite leading up to the actual baptismal washing on Easter. During this time, catechumens attended several meetings of intensive catechetical instruction, often by the bishop himself, and often accompanied by special prayers, exorcisms, and other rites. Catechumens recited the Creed on Holy Saturday to show that they had completed their catechetical instruction. At dawn following the Paschal Vigil starting the night of Holy Saturday, they were taken to the baptistry where the bishop consecrated the water with a long prayer recounting the types of baptisms. The catechumens disrobed, were anointed with oil, renounced the devil and his works, confessed their faith in the Trinity, and were immersed in the font. They were then anointed with chrism, received the laying on of hands, clothed in white, and led to join the congregation in the Easter celebration. By then, postponement of baptism had become general, and a large proportion of believers were merely catechumens (Constantine was not baptized until he was dying); but as baptisms of the children of Christians, using an adaptation of the rite intended for adults, became more common than baptisms of adult converts, the number of catechumens decreased.

As baptism was believed to forgive sins, the issue of sins committed after baptism arose. Some insisted that apostasy, even under threat of death, and other grievous sins cut one off forever from the Church. As indicated in the writings of Saint Cyprian, others favoured readmitting the "lapsi" easily. The rule that prevailed was that they were readmitted only after undergoing a period of penance that demonstrated sincere repentance.

What is now generally called the Nicene Creed, longer than the text adopted by the First Council of Nicaea of 325, and known also as the Niceno-Constantinopolitan Creed because of its adoption in that form by the First Council of Constantinople in 381, was probably the baptismal creed then in use in Constantinople, the venue of the 381 Council.

=== Infant Baptism ===
Whether the earliest Christians practiced infant baptism, and thus whether modern Christians should do so, has remained a subject of debate between Christian scholars at least since the earliest clear reference to the practice by Tertullian in the early third century. Some claim that Biblical baptism can be interpreted and thus relative, others support the Biblical literal baptism as a public and personal testimony, without intermediaries, in the case of infants that cannot talk for themselves yet.

== Early Middle Ages ==
Against Pelagius, Augustine insisted that baptism was necessary for salvation even for virtuous people and for children. The baptismal rite was significantly simplified during the sixth, seventh, and eighth centuries as fewer and fewer of those baptized were converts from paganism. The rite became much less important and was conducted very quickly. Prebaptismal catechesis was abandoned, and baptism was usually conducted shortly after birth.

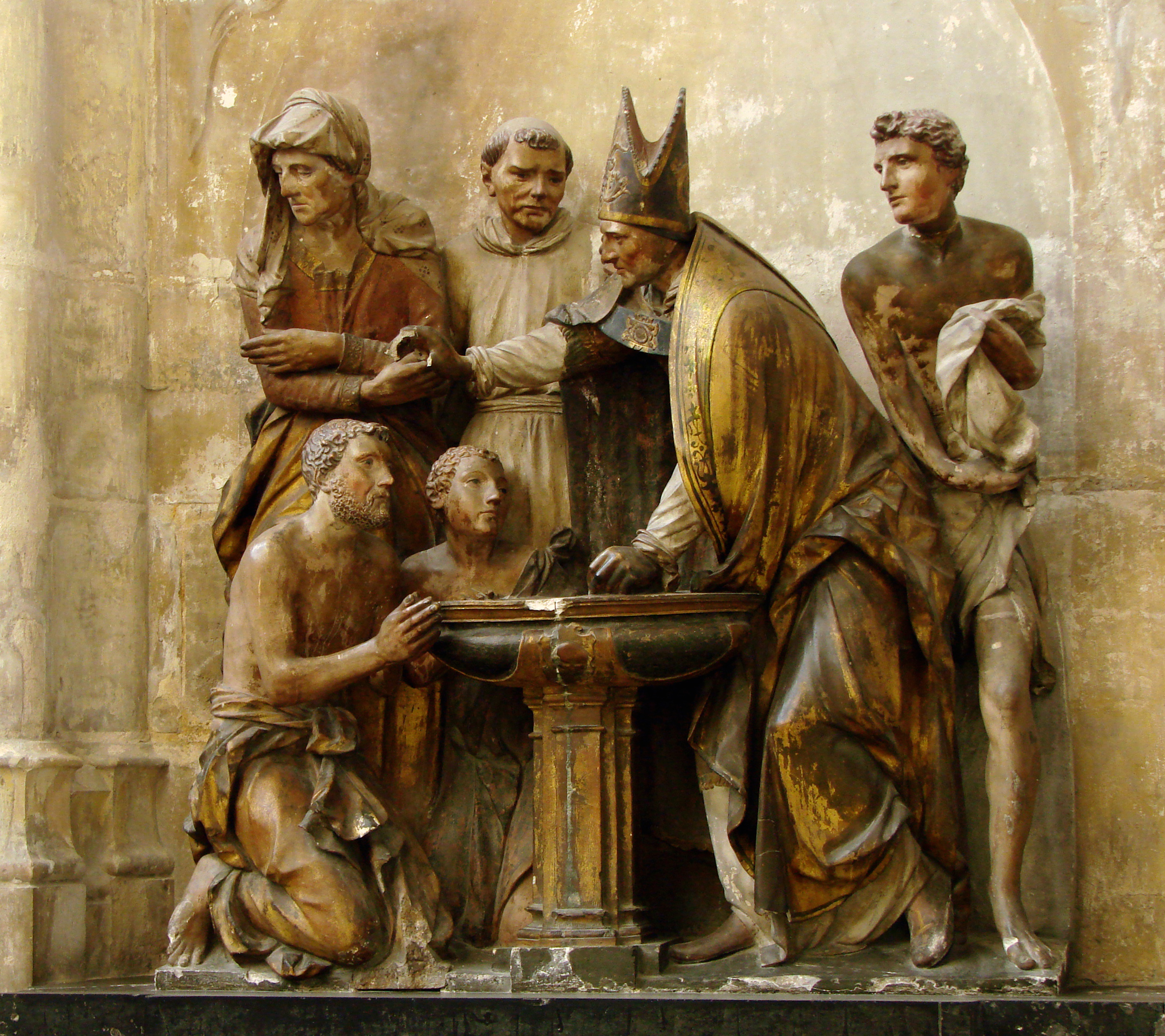
Baptism of Augustine of Hippo as represented in a sculptural group in Troyes cathedral (1549)

== Middle Ages ==
In 895, the provincial Council of Tribur commented on the traditional teaching that the triple immersion in baptism was an imitation of Christ for the three days he spent in the tomb, and the rising from the water an imitation of the resurrection of Jesus. The linking of the baptismal immersion in and rising from the water with the burial and resurrection of Jesus arguably goes back to Saint Paul, and the linking of the triple immersion with the three days in the tomb is found in Cyril of Jerusalem (c. 313–86) and Gregory of Nyssa (c. 335 – after 394).

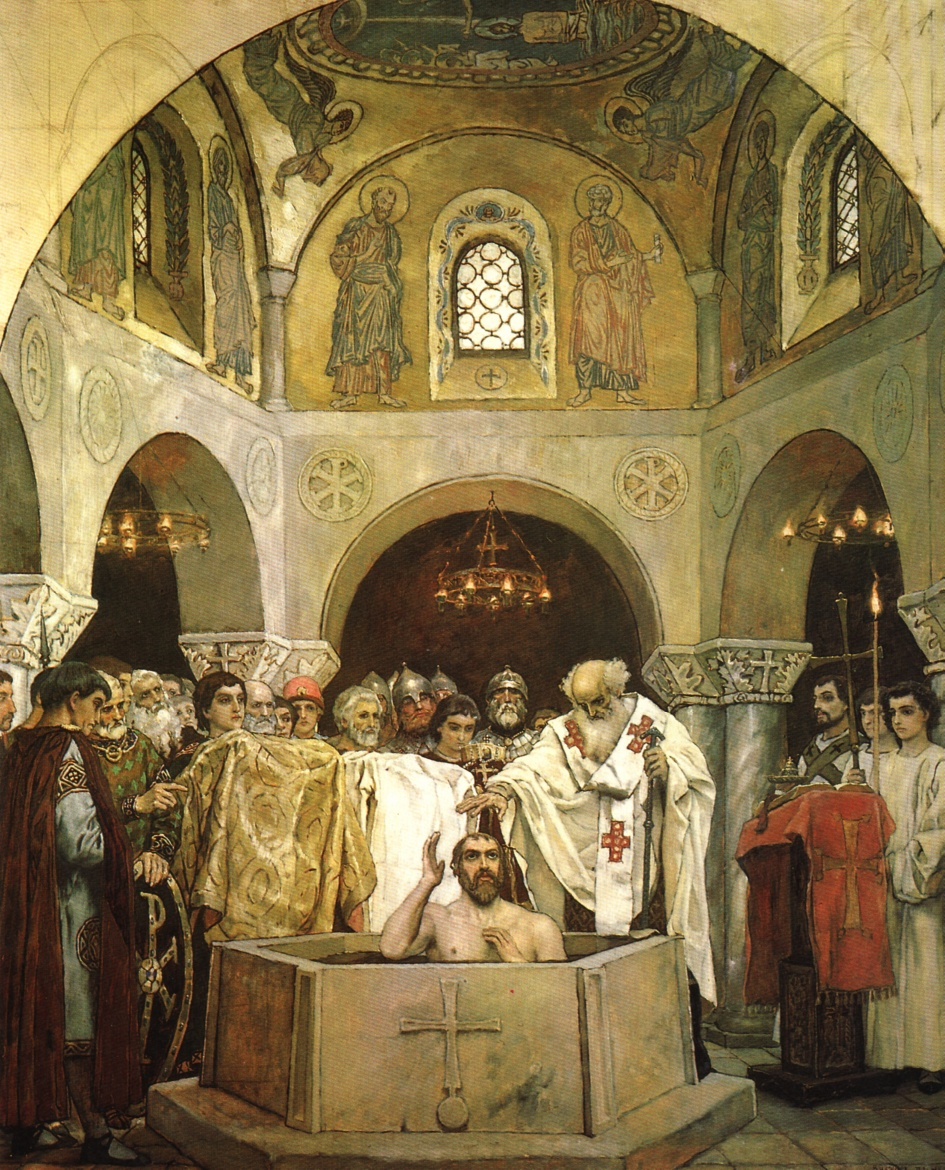
An 1890 sketch for St. Vladimir's Cathedral, Kiev: The Baptism of Saint Vladimir by Viktor Vasnetsov. Attendants (left) hold Vladimir's golden royal robes, which he has removed, and the simple white baptismal robe, which he will put on.

The 12th century saw the meaning of the word "sacrament" narrowed down and restricted to seven rites, among them that of baptism, while other symbolic rites came to be called "sacramentals".

In the period between the 12th and the 14th centuries, affusion became the usual manner of administering baptism in Western Europe, though immersion continued to be found in some places even as late as the 16th century. Throughout the Middle Ages, there was therefore considerable variation in the kind of facility required for baptism, from the baptismal pool large enough to immerse several adults simultaneously of the 13th century Baptistery at Pisa, to the half-metre deep basin in the 6th century baptistery of the old Cologne Cathedral.

Both East and West considered washing with water and the Trinitarian baptismal formula necessary for administering the rite. Scholasticism referred to these two elements as the matter and the form of the sacrament, employing terms taken from the then prevailing Aristotelian philosophy. The Catechism of the Catholic Church, while teaching the necessity of both elements, nowhere uses these philosophical terms when speaking of any of the sacraments. (Note: The words "matter" and "form" are not found in the index, nor do they appear in the definition of the sacraments given in section 1131. A search of the electronic form of the book finds no instance of the word "matter", and finds "form" only in the section 1434, headed "The Many Forms of Penance in Christian Life", which is not about the sacraments.)

== Reformation ==
In the 16th century, Martin Luther considered baptism to be a sacrament. For the Lutherans, baptism is a "means of grace" through which God creates and strengthens "saving faith" as the "washing of regeneration" in which infants and adults are reborn. Since the creation of faith is exclusively God's work, it does not depend on the actions of the one baptized, whether infant or adult. Even though baptized infants cannot articulate that faith, Lutherans believe that it is present all the same. Because it is faith alone that receives these divine gifts, Lutherans confess that baptism "works forgiveness of sins, delivers from death and the devil, and gives eternal salvation to all who believe this, as the words and promises of God declare." In the special section on infant baptism in his Large Catechism, Luther argues that infant baptism pleases God because persons so baptized were reborn and sanctified by the Holy Spirit.

Swiss Reformer Huldrych Zwingli differed with the Lutherans by denying that baptism conveys grace to the baptized. Zwingli identified baptism and the Lord's supper as sacraments, but in the sense of an initiatory ceremony.

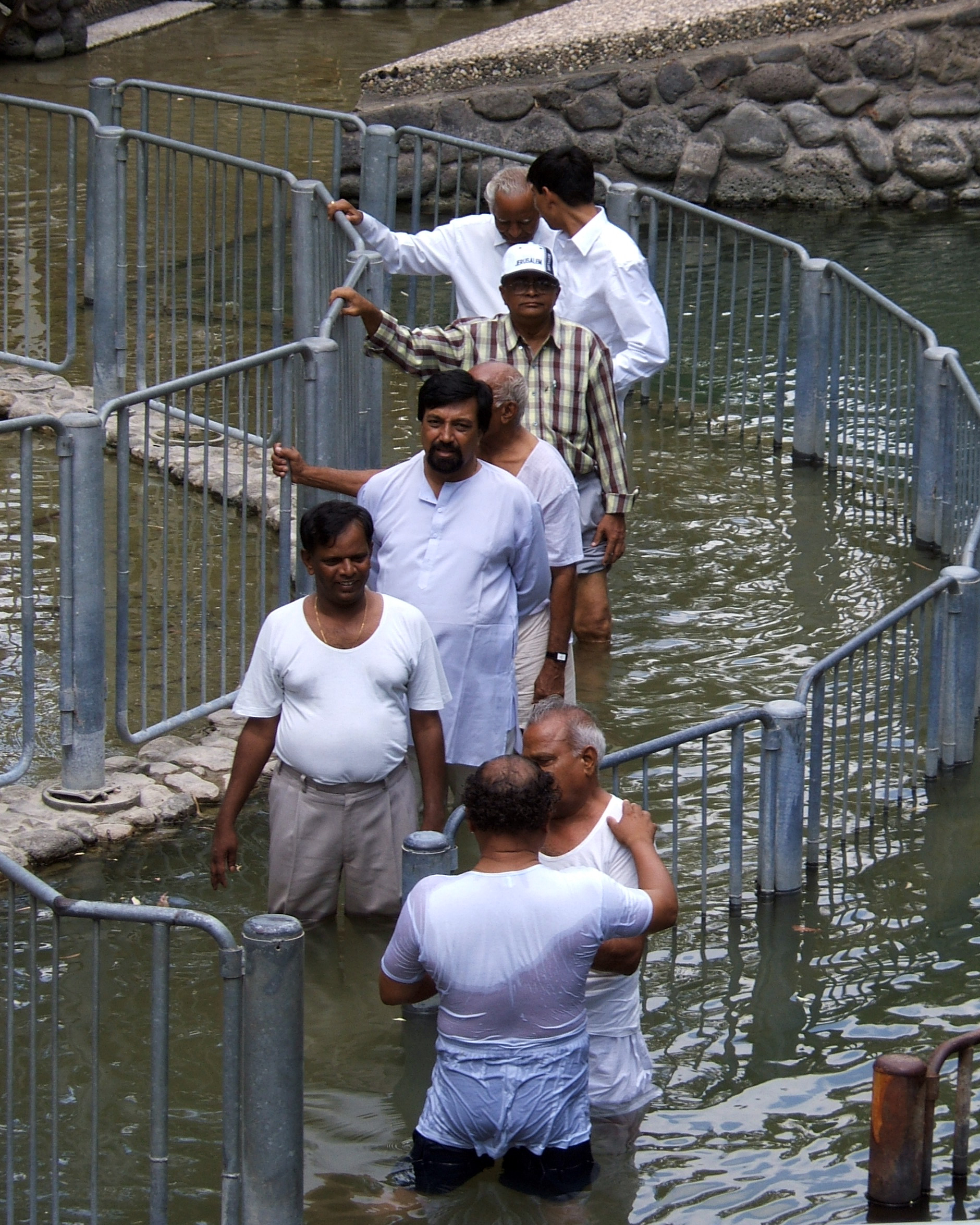
Awaiting submersion baptism in the Jordan River

Anabaptists (a word that means "rebaptizers") rejected so thoroughly the tradition maintained by Lutherans as well as Catholics that they denied the validity of baptism outside their group. They "rebaptized" converts on the grounds that one cannot be baptized without wishing it, and an infant, who does not understand what happens in a baptism ceremony and who has no knowledge of the concepts of Christianity, is not really baptized. They saw as non-biblical the baptism of infants, who cannot confess their faith and who, not having yet committed any sins, are not in the same need of salvation. Anabaptists and other Baptist groups do not consider that they rebaptize those who have been baptized as infants, since, in their view, infant baptism is without effect. The Amish, Restoration churches (Churches of Christ/Christian Church), Hutterites, Baptists, Mennonites and other groups descend from this tradition. Pentecostal, charismatic and most non-denominational churches share this view as well.

In Reformed baptismal theology, starting with John Calvin, baptism is seen as primarily God's offer of union with Christ and all his benefits to the baptized. This offer is believed to be intact even when it is not received in faith by the person baptized. Baptism also initiates one into the visible church and the covenant of grace.

== See also ==
=== Related articles and subjects ===
- Anabaptist
- Baptism by fire
- Baptism of desire
- Baptism of Jesus
- Baptism in Mormonism
- Baptismal clothing
- Baptistery
- Believer's baptism
- Catechumen
- Chrismation
- Christifideles
- Conditional baptism
- Consolamentum
- Disciple (Christianity)
- Divine filiation
- Emergency baptism
- Jesus-Name doctrine
- Prevenient Grace
- Sacrament
- Theophany

=== People and ritual objects ===
- Baptismal font
- Baptistery
- Chrism
- Godparent
- Holy water
- Holy water in Eastern Christianity
- John the Baptist
- Mikveh

== Bibliography ==
- Cross, Frank Leslie; Livingstone, Elizabeth A (2005), "Baptism", The Oxford Dictionary of the Christian Church, Oxford: Oxford University Press, ISBN 0-19-280290-9, OCLC 58998735.
- Ferguson, Everett (1996), The church of Christ: a biblical ecclesiology for today.
- Hellholm, David, ed. (2011), Ablution, Initiation, and Baptism, et al.
- Jensen, Robin M (2012), Baptismal Imagery in Early Christianity: Ritual, Visual, and Theological Dimensions.
- Old, Hughes Oliphant (1992), The Shaping of the Reformed Baptismal Rite in the Sixteenth Century, Grand Rapids, MI: William B. Eerdmans Publishing Company, ISBN 978-0-8028-2489-9.
- Riggs, John W. (2002). Baptism in the Reformed Tradition: A Historical and Practical Theology. Louisville, KY: Westminster John Knox Press. ISBN 0-664-21966-7.
- Rudolph, Kurt (1977). "Mandaeism". In Moore, Albert C. (ed.). Iconography of Religions: An Introduction. Vol. 21. Chris Robertson. ISBN 9780800604882.
- Schreiner, Thomas (2007), Believer's Baptism: Sign of the New Covenant in Christ, p. 81.
- Turner, John D. (2001), Sethian Gnosticism and the Platonic Tradition, Presses Université Laval
