= Rishama (ablution) =

Daily ablution ritual in Mandaeism

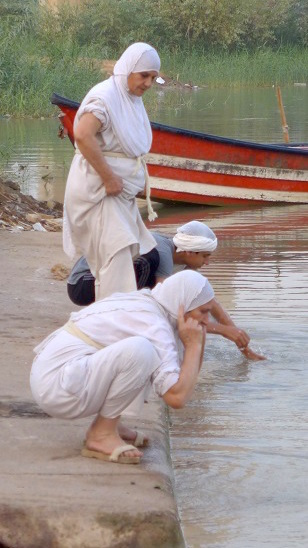
Mandaeans performing rishama at the Karun River in Ahvaz, Iran

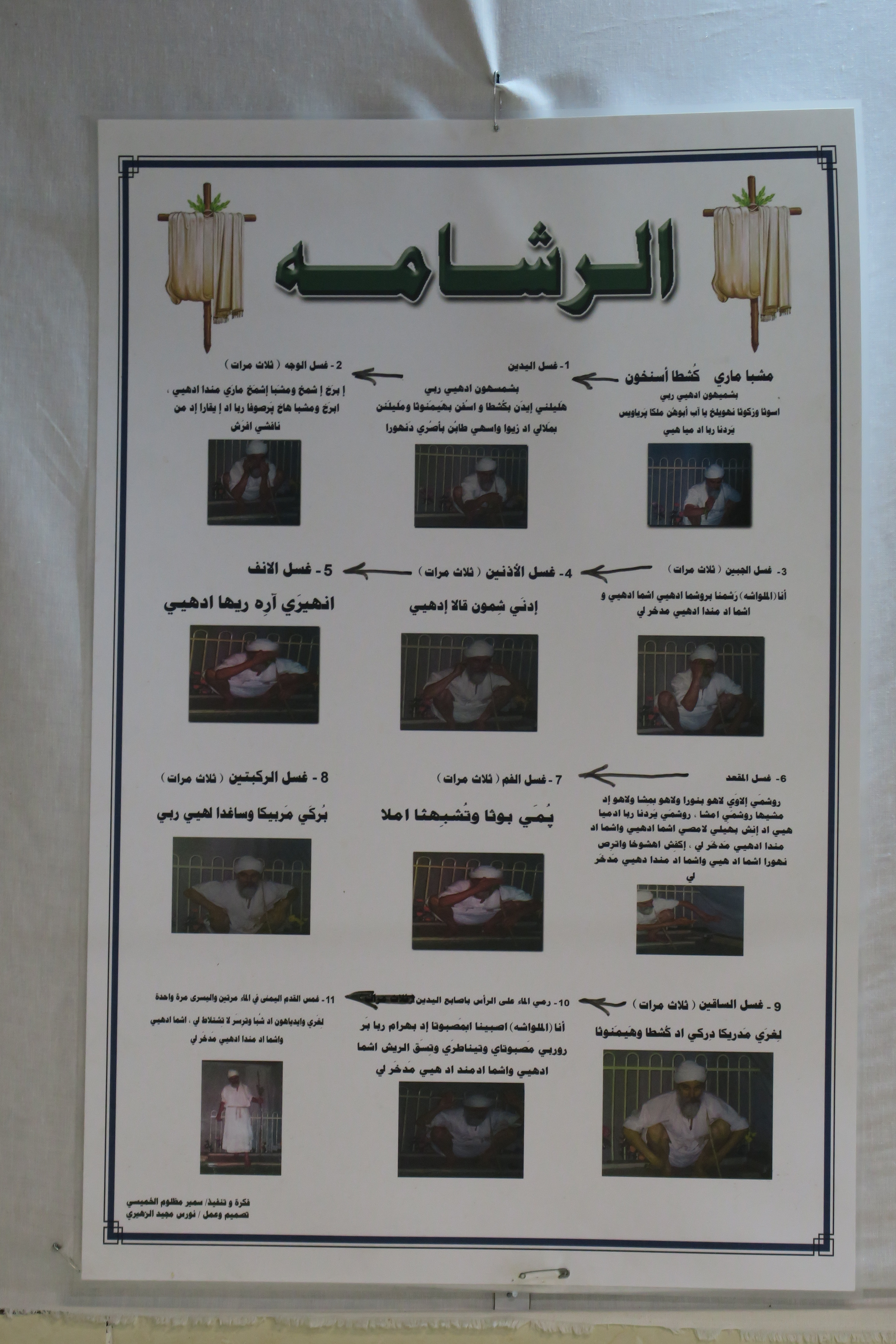
Instructions in Arabic on how to perform rishama (photograph taken at Yahya Yuhana Mandi in Sydney, Australia). Summary: 1. Wash the hands; 2. Wash the face 3 times; 3. Wash the forehead 3 times; 4. Wash the ears 3 times; 5. Wash the nose; 6. Wash the seat; 7. Wash the mouth 3 times; 8. Wash the knees 3 times; 9. Wash the legs 3 times; 10. Throw water on the head with the fingers of both hands; 11. Dip right and then left foot in water

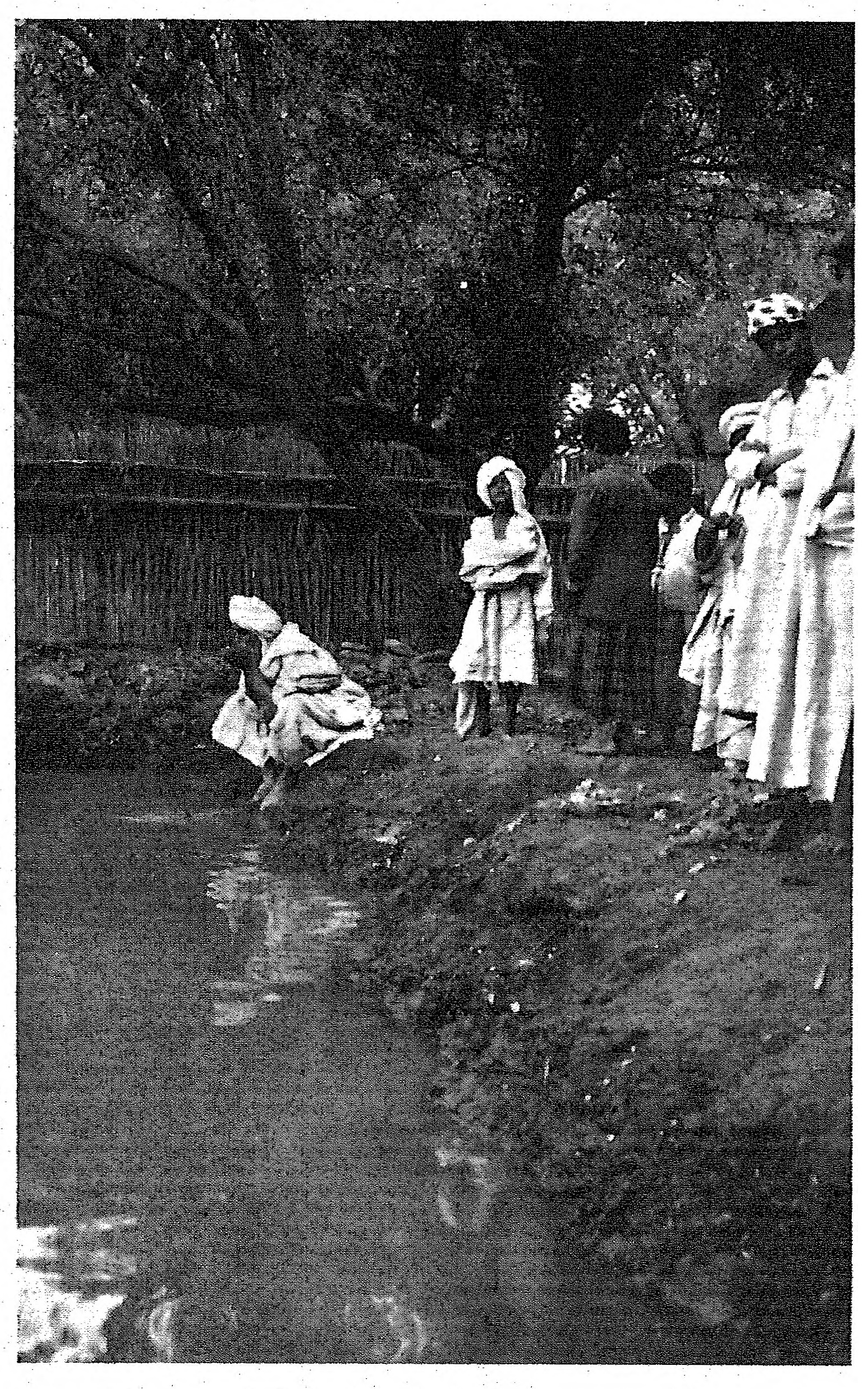
Rishama performed during the 1930s in southern Iraq

In Mandaeism, rishama (rišama) (Classical Mandaic: ࡓࡉࡔࡀࡌࡀ, romanized: rišama) is a daily ablution ritual. Unlike the masbuta, it does not require the assistance of a priest. Rishama (signing) is performed before prayers and involves washing the face and limbs while reciting specific prayers such as the rushma. It is performed daily, before sunrise, with hair covered and after evacuation of bowels, or before religious ceremonies.

Tamasha (ṭamaša) is another type of ablution performed by Mandaeans in which the entire body is fully immersed three times in water.

Although the term for the Mandaean daily minor ablution is also spelled the same in written Classical Mandaic (rišama), the word for 'minor ablution' is pronounced in Modern Mandaic as rešāmā, while 'head priest' is pronounced rišammā.

== Procedures ==
Rishama ritual steps or procedures may vary according to the location or priest's instructions. Below is a list of rishama procedures by Shadan Choheili of the Ganzibra Dakhil Mandi in Liverpool, New South Wales, Australia.

1. Squat or kneel in front of the yardna.
2. Purify (tamasha) hands in water.
3. Purify face three times.
4. Dip right hand in the water and draw a line ("rišam") 3 times from right to left across the forehead.
5. Dip index fingers in water and point to ears three times.
6. Take water using the right-hand palm and inhale the water's scent three times.
7. Slightly dip the left hand in the water and splash the water using the right hand towards the left hand.
8. Using the right-hand palm, fill and wash the mouth, and spit towards the left three times.
9. Dip fingers in water and point towards the knees three times.
10. Dip your fingers in water and point towards your feet three times.
11. Dip your fingers in water, recite a prayer, and use your fingers to dip, then splash water forward three times.
12. Stand up and dip toes in the water (right foot first, then left foot afterwards).

Specific Mandaic prayers are said during each step of the rishama.

== Parallels ==
The ablution is comparable to wudu in Islam.

John D. Turner and other scholars have noted that in Sethianism, rituals reminiscent of Mandaean ablutions (i.e., the rishama and tamasha) are mentioned in Nag Hammadi texts such as the Trimorphic Protennoia, since they involve triple immersion in water, signing, and other similar features.

== See also ==
- Rushma
- Ablution in Christianity
- Ritual washing in Judaism
- Wudu in Islam
