= Bīt rimki =

Mesopotamian prophylactic ritual

Bīt rimki, “House of Ablution” or "Bath-house", is an ancient Mesopotamian prophylactic ritual and accompanying incantation series, recorded on seven or more tablets, the first of which describes the actual performance of the ritual. Its purpose was to cleanse the person of the Assyrian king, and his household, of the evils portended by the inauspicious sign of a lunar eclipse, witchcraft, ritual abuse, etc. The correspondence of Esarhaddon with his priests Adad-šumu-uṣur, Urad-Ea, Marduk-šākin-šumi, and Nabû-nāṣir shows that he was subjected to this ceremony on four separate occasions, while masquerading as a "farmer", in an elaborate substitute-king ritual. The Assyrian king of Babylon, Šamaš-šum-ukin, endured two such rituals where fresh copies of the incantation tablets were laboriously prepared. It seems likely that the ceremony lasted seven days.

== The ritual ==
The Šamaš cycle of bīt rimki is a group of seven themed “houses”, or perhaps more properly “stations”, at each of which a pair of prayers, a bilingual ki’utu kam (invocation of Šamaš) recited by an āšipu, "exorcist", at daybreak, a šu’illa (prayer of lifted hands), recited by the king – and the ritual action (offerings to appease a deity, takpirtu "purification ritual", or apotropaic rite), to accompany the incantations takes place. The king passed between each station of the temporary fabrication called bīt rimki, probably a reed-built structure, was ritually bathed and dressed in fresh clothes while passing a series of evils on to figurines representing his persecutors, the demons who have contaminated him, dousing them with wash water or spittle. Finally, he emerged from the structure with his priest – purified, reborn, and ready to resume his monarchical office.

The incantations prescribed in the ritual tablet included a universal namburbi to avert inauspicious portents, and several ušburrudûs to dissolve sorcery. Although all exemplars of this ritual have their origin in Assyrian courtly compilation, it was composed from material of Babylonian source material.

== See also ==
- Masbuta in Mandaeism
