= Takpirtu =

Nice

Takpirtu or Takpertu, inscribed tak-pir-tú and as a gloss to the term šu-gur-gur-meš, and literally meaning “wiping,” from kupurru, “to wipe, rub,” or more generally ““to perform a wiping rite,” were Mesopotamian purification rituals whose oldest attestations go back to the Old Babylonian period. It was an integral part of the Bīt rimki (House of Ablution) and Bīt salā’ mê (house of water sprinkling) rituals and may have been a cleansing rite in its own right as it is listed separately in the Exorcists Manual, perhaps in the form of tak-pir-tú nussētiq, burnt offerings.

== The ritual ==
Its earliest appearance seems to have been at Mari. Middle Babylonian attestation comes in the form of two references to the supply of grain or flour for the ceremony in temple administrative tablets from Kassite Nippur.

In later neo-Assyrian and neo-Babylonian periods it was used for the spiritual cleansing of a field or a building, especially in the temple of the moon god Sîn in Uruk, but also in the context of a person, such as a sick person or the king, a type of cleansing ceremony was accompanied by a liḫšu, whispered prayer, “By the life of Anu and Enlil they are conjured,” or conjuration, "butting evil." Dough was wiped over the thigh of the subject, a scapegoat was sacrificed or carcass of a sheep was used to purify the cella of the temple, which was afterwards cast into the river along with the zisurrû, “magic circle of flour,” and garakku-brazier, a black and white cord.
