= Masbuta =

Baptism ritual practiced in the Mandaean religion

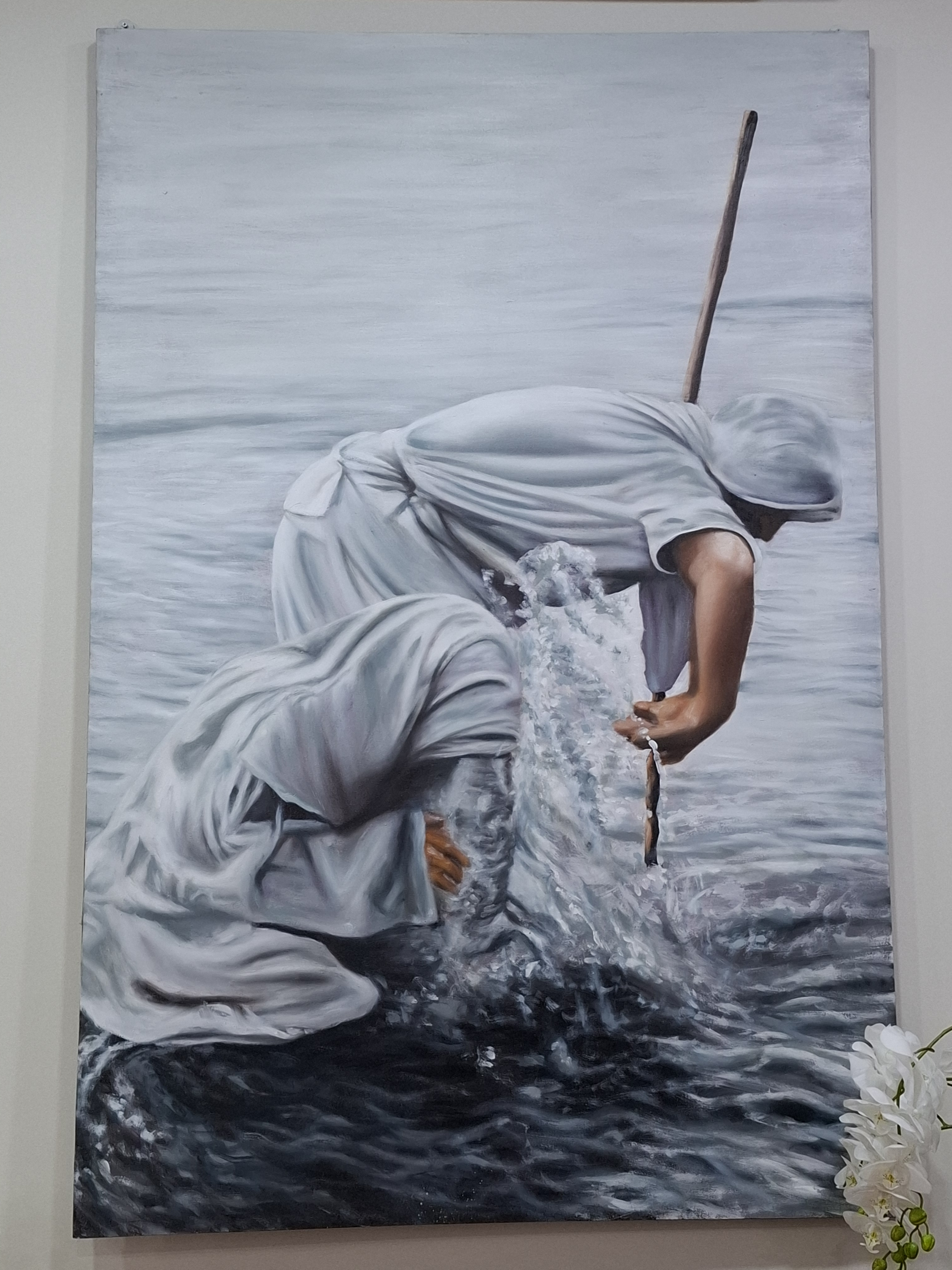
A painting at Ganzibra Dakhil Mandi in Liverpool, New South Wales, Australia that depicts the masbuta

Maṣbuta (Classical Mandaic: ࡌࡀࡑࡁࡅࡕࡀ; pronounced maṣβetta or maṣwottā in Neo-Mandaic) is the ritual of immersion in water in the Mandaean religion.

== Overview ==
Mandaeans revere John the Baptist and practice frequent baptism (masbuta) as ritual purification, not of initiation. They are possibly one of the earliest peoples to practice ritual baptism. Mandaeans undergo baptism on Sundays (Habshaba, Classical Mandaic: ࡄࡀࡁࡔࡀࡁࡀ), wearing a white sacral robe (rasta). Baptism for Mandaeans consists of a triple full immersion in water, a triple signing of the forehead with water (in which the priest puts his fingers on the baptized person's forehead and moves it from right to left), and a triple drinking of water. The priest (rabbi) then removes a ring made of myrtle (klila) worn by the baptized and places it on their forehead. This is then followed by a handclasp (kušṭa, "hand of truth") with the priest, using right hands only. The final blessing involves the priest laying his right hand on the baptized person's head.

Living water (fresh, natural, flowing water, called mia hayyi) is a requirement for baptism, therefore can only take place in rivers. All rivers are named Yardna "Jordan River" and are believed to be nourished by the World of Light. Mandaeans have traditionally rejected the concept of pilgrimage sites, since any river with flowing water is considered to be sufficient for performing religious rituals. By the riverbank, a Mandaean's forehead is anointed with sesame oil (misha) and partakes in a communion of sacramental bread (pihta) and water. Baptism for Mandaeans allows for salvation by connecting with the World of Light and for forgiveness of sins.

Although masbuta rituals are typically held only in the presence of Mandaeans, a historic commemorative masbuta ceremony was held at the 13th conference of the ARAM Society (titled "The Mandaeans"), which took place during 13–15 June 1999 on the banks of the Charles River at Harvard University.

== Procedure ==
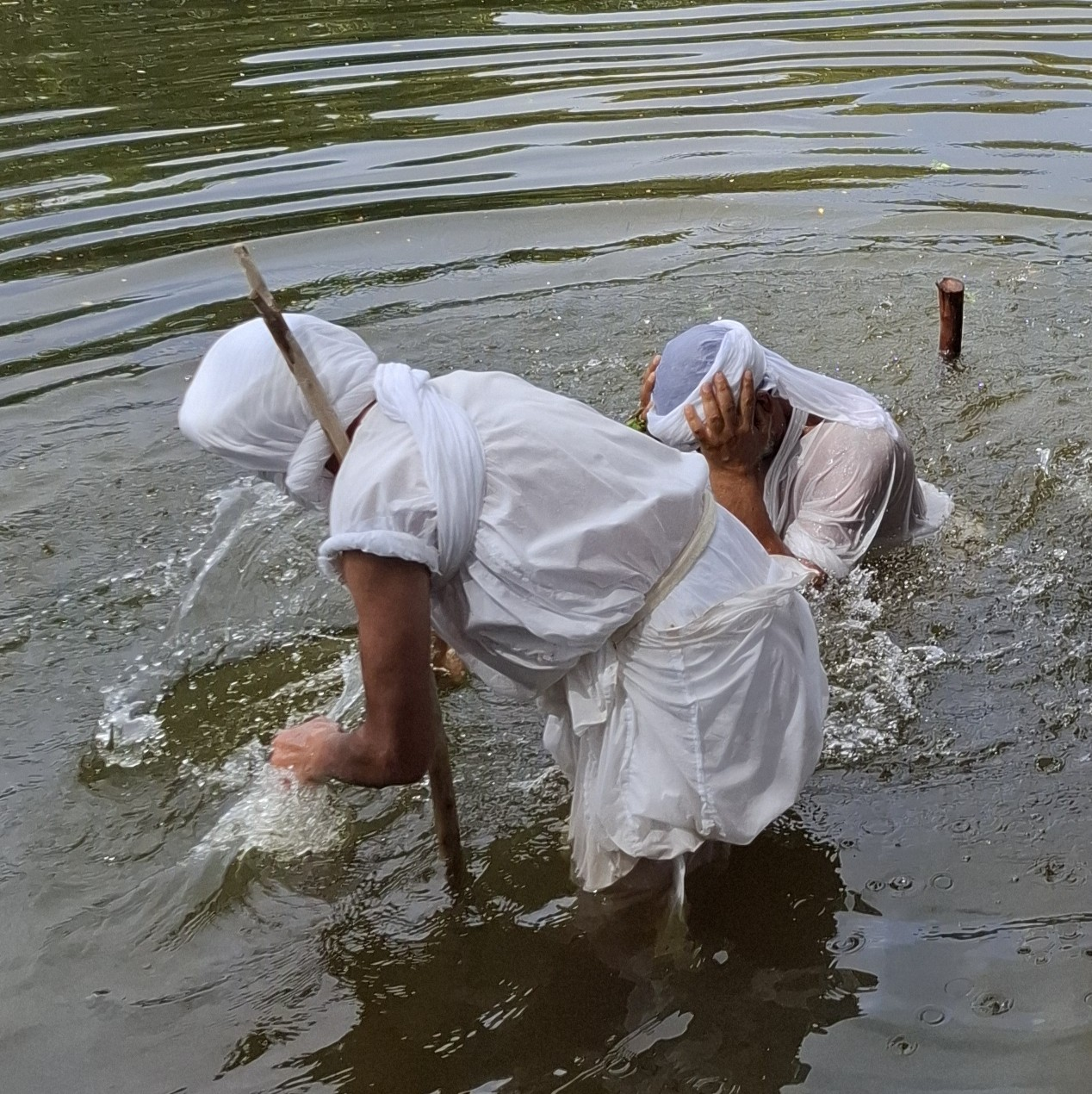
Rishamma Brikha Nasoraia performing masbuta for a Mandaean in the Georges River at Liverpool, New South Wales, Australia during Parwanaya 2025. This is the initial water splashing stage of the masbuta.

The masbuta consists of several steps.

1. Water splashing: The Mandaean person to be baptized enters the water and stands chest-deep in water behind the officiating priest. The priest will ask for the person's malwasha (Mandaean baptismal name) if he does not know it. The priest, standing in front of the baptized person, uses both hands to splash water on the baptized person several times in rapid succession as he pronounces the baptized person's malwasha a few times. During the water splashing, the baptized person holds his burzinqa (turban) with both hands.
2. First kushta: The baptized person and priest hold each other's right hands. This handclasp is known as the kushta.
3. Triple immersion of head in water: The priest holds the baptized person's head with both hands and dips the head inside the water three times.
4. Triple signing across the forehead: The priest strokes his right fingers horizontally across the lower front end of the baptized person's burzinqa (turban) on his forehead three times, from right to left.
5. Triple drinking of water from the priest's hand: The priest dips his right lower arm and right hand in the water, with his elbow forming a 90 degree angle, and then gives the baptized person water to drink from his palm. This is done three times.
6. Placing the klila in the burzinqa: The priest takes the baptized person's klila (myrtle twig ringlet) from his hand and places it into the baptized person's burzinqa.
7. Final kushta: The priest stands up and places his right hand on the baptized person's head as he says final blessings. The two then exchange a final kushta (handclasp), and the baptized person emerges from the water.

== Types ==
There are different types of masbuta used for different purposes. Similarly, there are also several different types of masiqta (see Masiqta § Types). A few types of masbuta are:

- 360 baptisms: 360 consecutive baptisms are needed to cleanse a polluted priest. Sets of 360 baptisms are described in texts such as The Baptism of Hibil Ziwa and Šarḥ ḏ-Maṣbuta Rabia ("The Scroll of the Great Baptism"; DC 50).
- Masbuta of Zihrun Raza Kasia, described in the Zihrun Raza Kasia scroll.

Masbuta is distinct from ṭamaša "immersion" and rišama "ablution", which are personal ritual purification rituals that do not require the presence of a priest. Ṭamaša is typically performed after bodily pollutions, such as seminal discharge, sexual activity, or after subsiding from unclean thoughts or anger at another person. This ablution is comparable to tevilah in Judaism and ghusl in Islam. Rišama is performed daily before prayers and religious ceremonies or after bowel evacuation and is comparable to wudu in Islam.

== Parallels with other religious traditions ==
Birger A. Pearson finds many parallels between the Sethian ritual of the Five Seals and the Mandaean baptismal ritual of masbuta.

In Mandaic, Christian baptism is not referred to as maṣbuta, but rather as mamiduta (Classical Mandaic: ࡌࡀࡌࡉࡃࡅࡕࡀ; cognate with Syriac ܡܥܡܘܕܝܬܐ mʿmudita, used by Syriac Christians to refer to baptism), which Mandaean texts describe as unclean since it is performed in standing rather than flowing water.

Ryen (2009) notes that there are various similarities between Mandaean masbuta and baptism in Syriac Christianity, pointing to contact between the two religions during late antiquity.

== Gallery ==
Gallery of Mandaeans performing masbuta in the Karun River in Ahvaz, Iran:

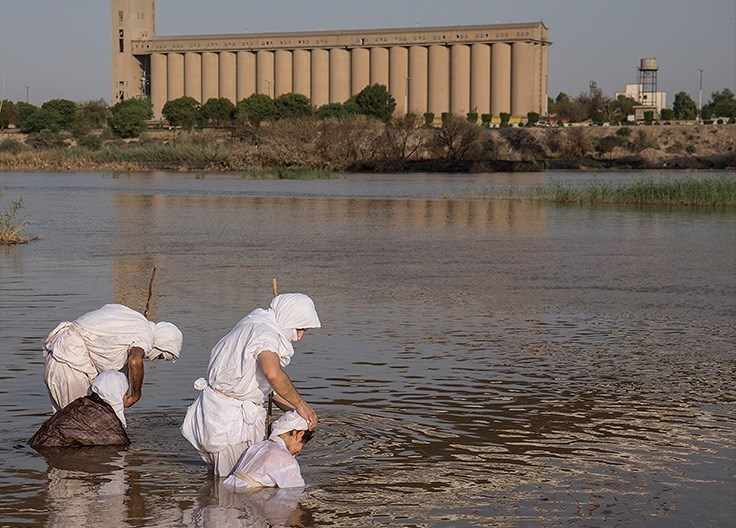

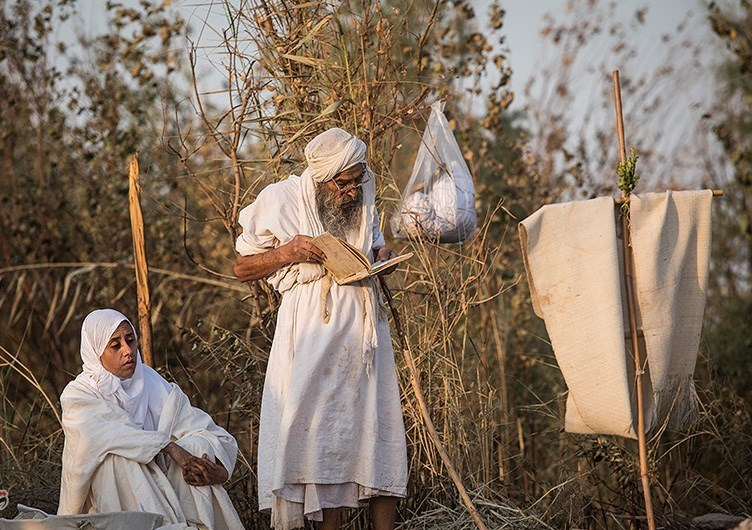

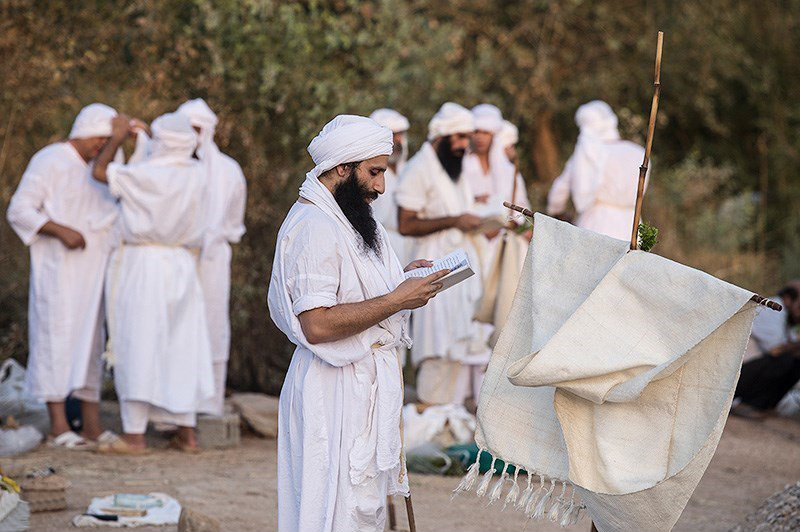

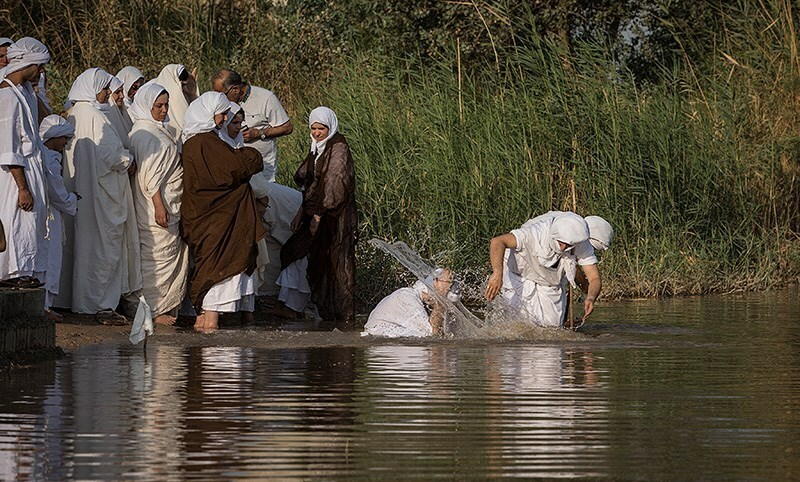

== See also ==
- History of baptism
- Baptism in early Christianity
- Immersion baptism
- Mikveh in Judaism
- Bīt rimki in Ancient Mesopotamia
- Misogi in Shinto
- Valentinianism § Baptism
- The Baptism of Hibil Ziwa
- Bihram
- Yardna
