= Five Trees =

Religious concept in Gnostic Christianity

The Five Trees in Paradise is an esoteric or allegorical image from the Coptic Gospel of Thomas, a collection of logia (sayings) of Jesus.

(19) Jesus said, "Blessed is he who came into being before he came into being. If you become My disciples and listen to My words, these stones will minister to you. For there are five trees for you in Paradise which remain undisturbed summer and winter and whose leaves do not fall. Whoever becomes acquainted with them will not experience death."

"Blessed is he who was before he came into being" is similar to other enigmatic statements commonly found in mysticism, and may refer to the benefits of self-awareness (knowledge of one's true nature) before developing one's ego-identity. "If you [listen], these stones will minister to you," may refer to "listening" to the true self within – accurately tracing the internal by observing the external – or it may mean that only through self-awareness are we able to understand Jesus' symbolic language and master external reality.

In the Acts of Thomas ch. 27, during an anointing ceremony, the apostle implores, "Come, elder of the five members, mind, thought, reflection, consideration, reason; communicate with these young men." According to Theodore bar Konai, the five words for 'mind' are the equivalents of hauna (sanity), mad'a (reason), re'yana (mindfulness), mahshebhatha (imagination), tar'itha (intention) – considered the Five Manifestations of the Father of Greatness which may provide the clue to the meaning of the five trees. These five would therefore be the causal factors in the experience of the Real.

Marvin Meyer writes: "The "five trees" in paradise are mentioned frequently in gnostic texts, ordinarily without explanation or elaboration. In Manichaean Psalm Book 161, 17–29, it is said that various features of life and faith are put together in groups of five. This section opens with the statement, 'For [five] are the trees that are in paradise ... in summer and winter.' On the trees in paradise according to Genesis, see Genesis 2:9."

According to the Naassenes, "Paradise" in this allegory represents the human head.

== See also ==
- Arich Anpin
- Christianity
- Genesis
- Five Seals
- Gnosticism
- Gospel of Thomas
- Jesus
- Kabbalah
- Logia
- Mysticism
- Nag Hammadi Library
- Shatrin in Mandaeism
- Partsufim
- Tree of Life
- Zeir Anpin
