= Three Seals (Manichaeism) =

In Manichaeism, the behavior of the Elect, the priestly class was traditionally bound by the Three Seals: Mouth, Hands, and Heart. By the Seal of the Mouth they were prohibited from eating meat or drinking wine. Once a day they ate food with the highest concentrations of light. By the Seal of the Hands, also called the Rest (of the Hands), they were prohibited from causing injury or pain to the light entrapped in water, fire, trees and living things. From a practical standpoint, this meant that they were unable to do any physical work, so they depended on the Auditors to bring them food. By the Seal of the Breast they were prohibited from marriage, sex and lust. (Note: The male and female Elect had no contact with each other.) Some Manichaeans said the Three Seals correspond to the Trinity of Nicaean Christianity; the Father, Son, and Holy Ghost. An alternative formulation divided the ethics of the Elect into Five Commandments: truth, non-injury, chastity, purity of mouth, and poverty. (Note: The Elect were supposed to possess nothing beyond food for one day and clothing for one year.) The Elect, who were "sealed" with the three seals of mouth and hands and breast (ensuring virtue of speech and act and feeling), lived in monasteries, but also went on journeys to spread and strengthen the faith, travelling on foot, preaching. They ate only once a day, a meal of vegetables taken after nightfall; and might possess food only for a day, clothing only for a year.

The observance of the Three Seals and the commandments of purity by the Manichaean Elect enables them to act as earthly agents for the release of captive Light, allowing the liberation of the human soul against Darkness which is impure in the body. Manichaean ethics focuses on abstinence and avoiding actions that prolong the divine light's bondage with the material world, owing to Manichaean theology having a negative view of the physical world. The conception of the Three Seals has also similarities with the Threefold Law of Asha in Zoroastrianism, although in the theological context of Manichaeism it is more oriented to salvation by way of purity rather than simply an ethical commandment.

== See also ==
- Five Seals in Sethianism
