= Five Seals =

Baptismal rite in Sethian Gnosticism

In Sethian Gnostic texts, the Five Seals are typically described as a baptismal rite involving a series of five full immersions in holy running or "living water," symbolizing spiritual ascension to the divine realm. The Five Seals are frequently mentioned in various Sethian Gnostic texts from the Nag Hammadi library.

While some scholars consider the Five Seals to be literary symbolism rather than an actual religious ritual, Birger A. Pearson believes that the Five Seals refer to an actual ritual in which the initiate was ritually immersed in water five times. Pearson also finds many parallels between the Sethian ritual of the Five Seals and the Mandaean baptismal ritual of masbuta.

== Tractates ==
Tractates in the Nag Hammadi library that mention the Five Seals include:

- Apocryphon of John
- Holy Book of the Great Invisible Spirit
- Trimorphic Protennoia
- Zostrianos

The Holy Book of the Great Invisible Spirit, Trimorphic Protennoia, Zostrianos, and Apocalypse of Adam also mention Micheus, Michar, and Mnesinous as three heavenly guardian spirits presiding over the rite of baptism performed in the wellspring of Living Water, while Yesseus Mazareus Yessedekeus (i.e., Jesus of Nazareth the Righteous [ho dikaios]) is equated with the Living Water.

In contrast, Marsanes mentions Thirteen Seals rather than Five Seals.

=== Apocryphon of John ===
At the end of the Apocryphon of John, the Five Seals are described as protecting against death.

I raised and sealed the person in luminous water with Five Seals, that death might not prevail over the person from that moment on.

This quote has a parallel in Saying 19 of the Coptic Gospel of Thomas, attributed to Jesus.

For there are five trees in paradise for you; they do not change, summer or winter, and their leaves do not fall. Whoever knows them will not taste death.

=== Trimorphic Protennoia ===
In the Trimorphic Protennoia, the Five Seals are described in the following manner:

1. When you enter the light, you will be glorified by those who give glory,
2. and those who enthrone will enthrone you.
3. You will receive robes from those who give robes,
4. and the baptizers will baptize you,
5. and you will become exceedingly glorious, as you were in the beginning, when you were light.

In more detail later in the same text:

1. I delivered him to those who give robes, Yammon, Elasso, Amenai, and they clothed him with a robe from the robes of light.
2. I delivered him to the baptizers, and they baptized him, Micheus, Michar, Mnesinous, and they immersed him in the spring of the [water] of life.
3. I delivered him to those who enthrone, Bariel, Nouthan, Sabenai, and they enthroned him from the throne of glory.
4. I delivered him to those who glorify, Ariom, Elien, Phariel, and they glorified him with the glory of the fatherhood.
5. Those who rapture raptured, Kamaliel, ...anen, Samblo, the servants of the great holy luminaries, and they took him into the place of the light of his fatherhood.

=== Zostrianos ===
In Zostrianos, the protagonist Zostrianos is baptized five times in the name of Autogenes, the divine Self-Generated One.

== Parallels ==
The number five was also an important symbolic number in Manichaeism, with heavenly beings, concepts, and others often grouped in sets of five.

Buckley (2010) notes similarities with Mandaean baptism (masbuta).

== See also ==
- Masbuta, the main baptismal ritual in Mandaeism
- Tamasha (ablution), Mandaean ablution involving triple immersion in water
- Masiqta, divine ascension in Mandaeism
- History of baptism
- Immersion baptism
- Ritual washing in Judaism
- Mikveh in Judaism
- Five Trees
- Three Seals (Manichaeism)
