= Tamasha (ablution) =

Ablution ritual in Mandaeism

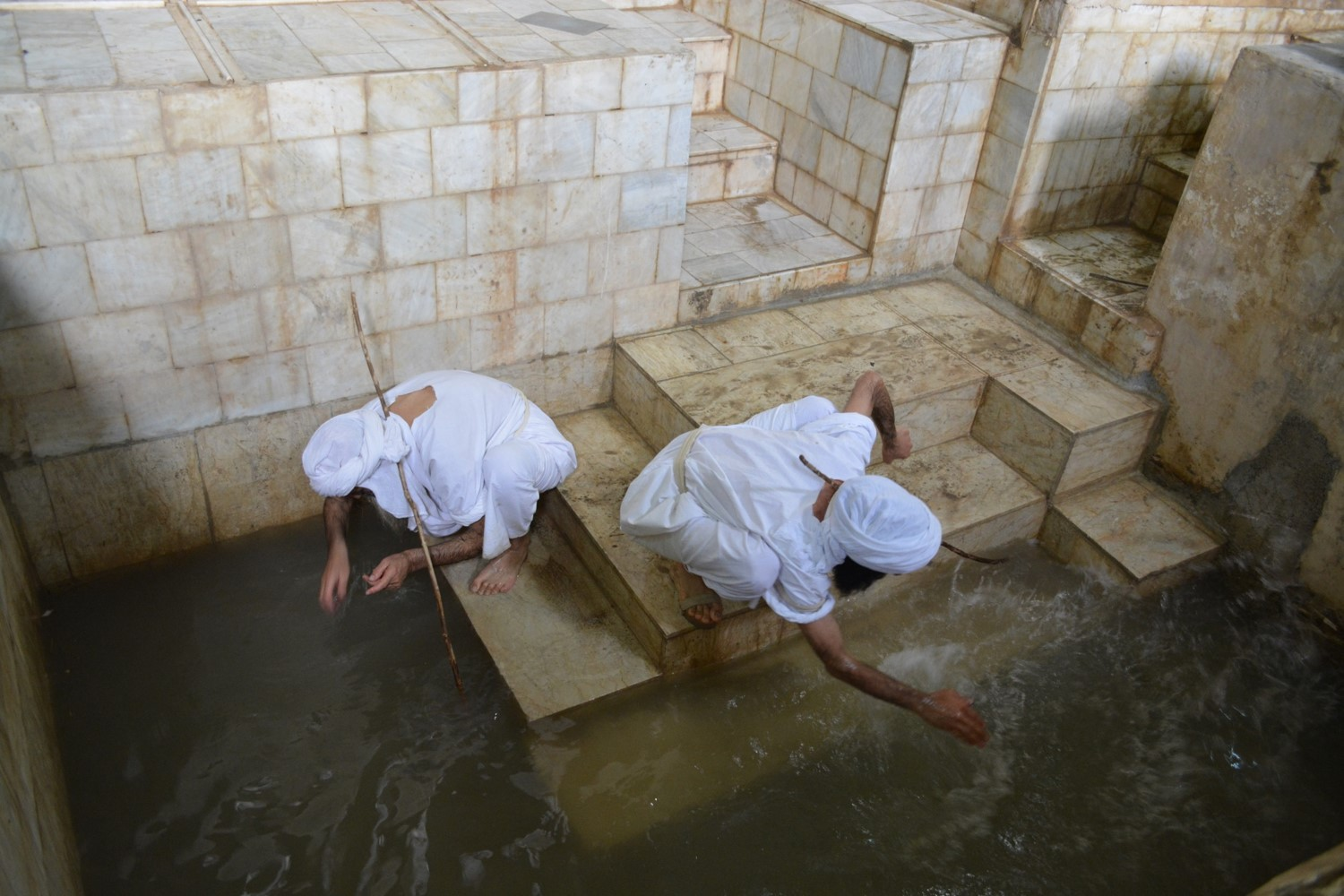
Mandaean priests performing tamasha in preparation for the masbuta during the 2015 Parwanaya festival in Ahvaz, Iran.

In Mandaeism, tamasha or ṭamaša (Classical Mandaic: ࡈࡌࡀࡔࡀ, romanized: ṭmaša) is an ablution ritual that does not require the assistance of a priest. Tamasha is performed by triple immersion in river (yardna) water. It is performed by women after menstruation or childbirth, men and women after sexual activity or nocturnal emission, touching a corpse, or any other type of defilement (ṭnupa). It is also performed after subsiding from unclean thoughts or anger at another person.

Rishama is another type of ablution performed by Mandaeans, in which the face and limbs are washed (similar to the wudu in Islam). However, unlike the tamasha, it does not involve full-body immersion in water. The rishama and tamasha ablution rituals, which do not require priestly assistance, are distinct from masbuta, which needs to be performed by a priest. Whereas the tamasha is a "self-immersion" in which devotees dip themselves into the water, during the masbuta, devotees need to be immersed into water by a priest, not by themselves.

The tamasha ablution is comparable to tevilah in Judaism and ghusl in Islam.

== See also ==
- Rushma
- Ablution in Christianity
- Five Seals in Sethianism
