= Hughes Oliphant Old =

American theologian and academic

Hughes Oliphant Old (April 13, 1933 – May 24, 2016) was an American theologian and academic. Until his retirement in 2014, he was the John H. Leith Professor of Reformed Theology and Worship at Erskine Theological Seminary. Previously he had taught at Princeton Theological Seminary.

== Biography ==
Old was born April 13, 1933, and received his Bachelor of Divinity from Princeton Theological Seminary in 1958 and his Doctor of Theology from the University of Neuchâtel in 1971. His first charge was minister of the Penningtonville Presbyterian Church in Atglen, Pennsylvania. In the late ‘70s he served as pastor at Faith Presbyterian Church in West Lafayette Indiana where he also led students at Purdue University in bible study. In 1977 he led a mission to the Yucatán peninsula to build a small chapel.

He was appointed a member of the Center of Theological Inquiry in Princeton, NJ in 1985. He taught at Princeton Seminary from 1998 to 2003, and in 2004 accepted a position at Erskine Theological Seminary, where he became John H. Leith Professor of Reformed Theology and Worship. He was also the dean of Erskine's Institute For Reformed Worship. He died on May 24, 2016.

Among his works are Worship: Reformed According to Scripture, The Patristic Roots of Reformed Worship, The Shaping of the Reformed Baptismal Rite in the Sixteenth Century, Leading in Prayer: A Workbook for Worship, and a series of books on preaching, The Reading and Preaching of the Scriptures in the Worship of the Christian Church. His 2013 book Holy Communion in the Piety of the Reformed Church was called the crowning achievement of his career, and a valuable overview of the "Reformed tradition of Eucharistic piety and reflection".
