= Immersion baptism =

Method of baptism

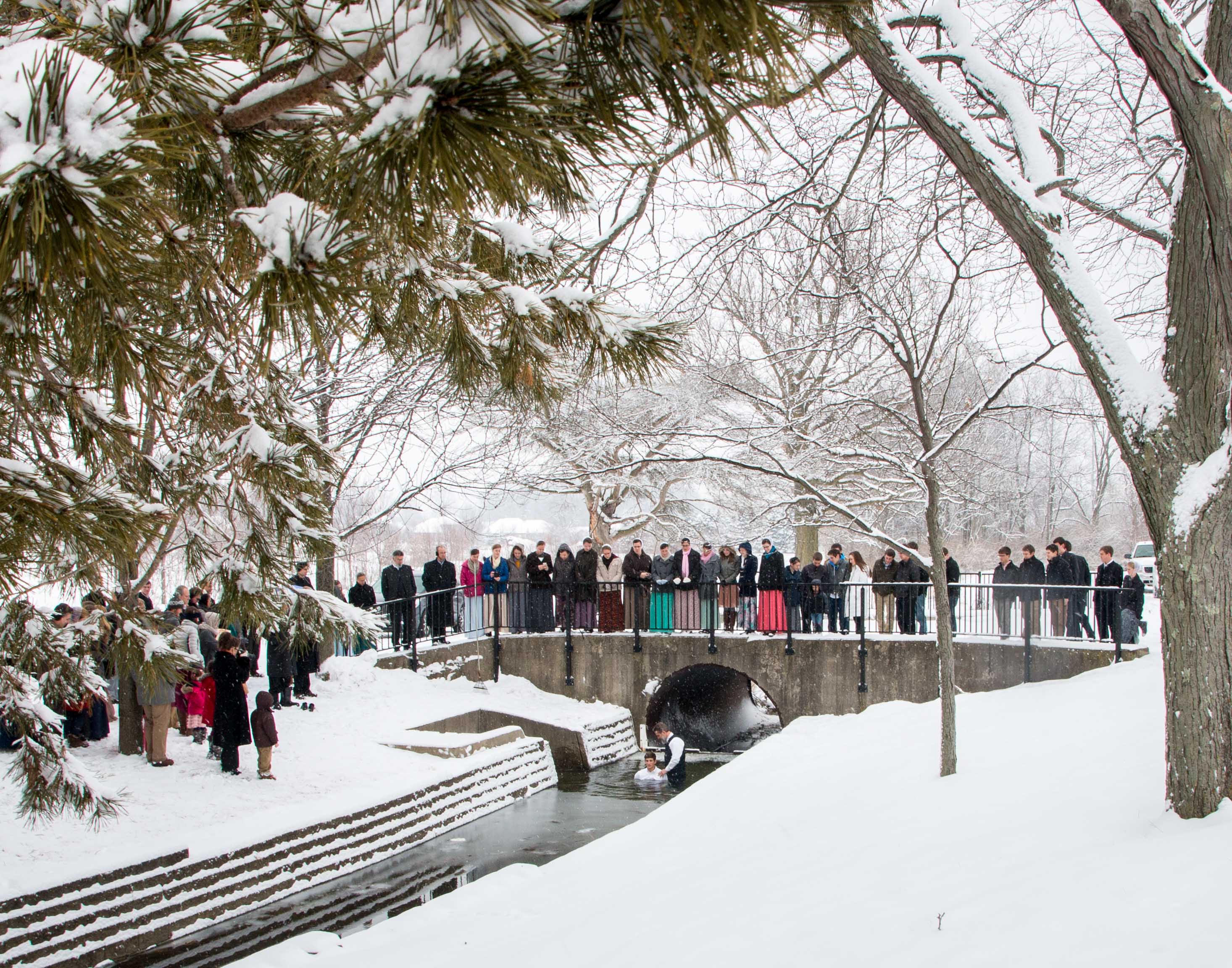
The ordinance of baptism by trine immersion is celebrated by the Salem Congregation of the Old German Baptist Brethren Church, New Conference, a Schwarzenau Brethren denomination of the Anabaptist Christian tradition.

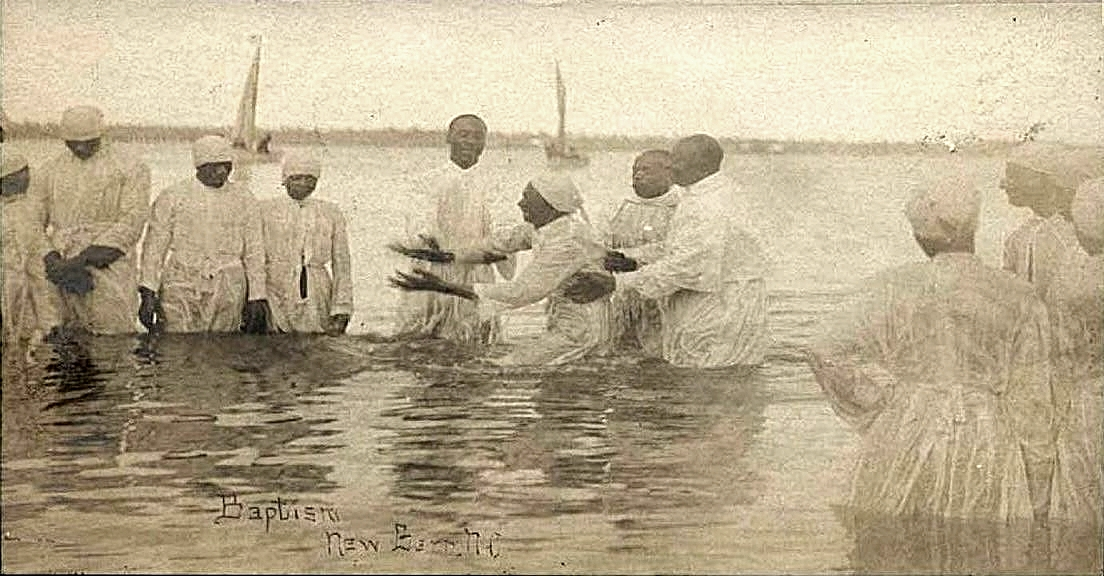
A full-immersion baptism in a New Bern, North Carolina river at the turn of the 20th century

Immersion baptism (also known as baptism by immersion or baptism by submersion) is a method of baptism that is distinguished from baptism by affusion (pouring) and by aspersion (sprinkling), sometimes without specifying whether the immersion is total or partial, but very commonly with the indication that the person baptized is immersed in water completely. The term is also, though less commonly, applied exclusively to modes of baptism that involve only partial immersion (see Terminology, below).

A specific form of baptism by immersion, known as triune immmersion (also termed trine immersion or threefold immersion) "consisting in the dipping of the candidate in the water three times-first, in the name of the Father, second, in the name of the Son, and, third, in the name of the Holy Spirit." Trine immersion was attested by Basil (370), Cyril (380), Ambrose (390), Augustine (420), Theodoret (450), and Alcuin (775). In the present day, trine immersion is practiced by the River Brethren and Schwarzenau Brethren, as well as by parts of the Eastern Orthodox Church.

== Terminology ==
Baptism by immersion is understood by some to imply submersion of the whole body beneath the surface of the water.

Others speak of baptismal immersion as either complete or partial, and do not find it tautologous to describe a particular form of immersion baptism as "full" or "total".

Still others use the term "immersion baptism" to mean a merely partial immersion by dipping the head in the water or by pouring water over the head of a person standing in a baptismal pool, and use instead for baptism that involves total immersion of the body beneath the water the term "submersion baptism".

== Early Christianity ==
Scholars generally agree that the early church baptized by immersion. It also used other forms. Immersion was probably the norm, but at various times and places immersion, whether full or partial, and also affusion were probably in use. Baptism of the sick or dying was usually by means other than even partial immersion and was still considered valid.

Some writers speak of early Christians baptizing by total immersion (i.e., submerging the person being baptized), or say only that total immersion was preferred. Others speak of early Christians as baptizing either by submersion or by immersion, but also by affusion. In one form of early Christian baptism, the candidate stood in water and water was poured over the upper body, and the Oxford Dictionary of the Christian Church says that at least from the 2nd century baptism was administered by a method "whereby part of the candidate's body was submerged in the baptismal water which was poured over the remainder".

=== Archaeological evidence ===
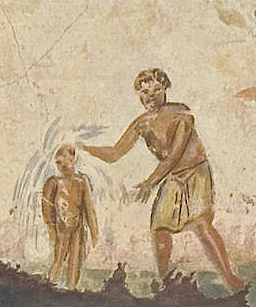
Catacombs of San Callisto: Baptism in a 3rd-century painting

William Sanford La Sor, Lothar Heiser, Jean-Charles Picard, Malka Ben Pechat, and Everett Ferguson agree that early Christian baptism was normally by total immersion. Sanford La Sor (1987) considers it likely that the archaeological evidence favours total immersion. Lothar Heiser (1986), likewise understands the literary and pictorial evidence to indicate total immersion. Jean-Charles Picard (1989), reaches the same conclusion, and so does Malka Ben Pechat (1989). The study by Everett Ferguson (2009) supports the view of La Sor, Heiser, Picard, and Pechat. Frank K. Flinn also says that the immersion was total, saying that the preference of the Early Church was total immersion in a stream or the sea or, if these were not available, in a fountain or bath-sized tank,

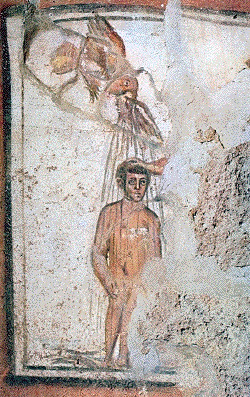
Baptism in early Christian art

Commenting on early church practice, other reference works speak of immersion without specifying whether it was total or partial. A recent Bible encyclopedia speaks of the "consensus of scholarly opinion" that the baptismal practice of John the Baptist and the apostles was by immersion. A standard Bible dictionary says that baptism was normally by immersion. Among other sources, Old says that immersion (though not the only form), was normally used, Grimes says "There is little doubt that early Christian baptism was adult baptism by immersion.", Howard Marshall says that immersion was the general rule, but affusion and even sprinkling were also practiced, since "archaeological evidence supports the view that in some areas Christian baptism was administered by affusion". His presentation of this view has been described by Porter and Cross as "a compelling argument". Laurie Guy says immersion was probably the norm, but that at various times and places full immersion, partial immersion and affusion were probably in use. Tischler says that total immersion seems to have been most commonly used. Stander and Louw argue that immersion was the prevailing practice of the Early Church. Grenz says that the New Testament does not state specifically what action the baptizer did to the person baptized, when both were in the water, but adds: "Nevertheless, we conclude that of the three modes immersion carries the strongest case – exegetically, historically, and theologically. Therefore, under normal circumstances it ought to be the preferred, even the sole, practice of the church." Most scholars agree that immersion was the practice of the New Testament church.

The Oxford Dictionary of the Bible (2004) says "Archaeological evidence from the early centuries shows that baptism was sometimes administered by submersion or immersion… but also by affusion from a vessel when water was poured on the candidate's head…"

The Cambridge History of Christianity (2006) also concludes from the archaeological evidence that pouring water three times over the head was a frequent arrangement.

Robin Jensen writes: "Historians have sometimes assumed that baptism was usually accomplished by full immersion – or submersion – of the body (dunking). However, the archaeological and iconographic evidence is ambiguous on this point. Many – if not most – surviving baptismal fonts are too shallow to have allowed submersion. In addition, a significant number of depictions show baptismal water being poured over the candidate's head (affusion), either from a waterfall, an orb or some kind of liturgical vessel." Eerdman's Dictionary of the Bible, also casts doubt on "the usual assumption that all NT baptisms were by immersion", stating that some early baptisteries were deep enough to stand in but not broad enough to lie down in, and mentioning that ancient representation of Christ at his baptism show him standing in waist-deep water. The immersion used by early Christians in baptizing "need not have meant full submersion in the water" and, while it may have been normal practice, it was not seen as a necessary mode of baptism, so that other modes also may have been used. Submersion, as opposed to partial immersion, may even have been a minority practice in early Christianity.

=== Earliest description of Christian baptism outside the New Testament ===
The Didache or Teaching of the Twelve Apostles, an anonymous book of 16 short chapters, is probably the earliest known written instructions, outside of the Bible, for administering baptism. The first version of it was written c. 60–80 AD. The second, with insertions and additions, was written c. 100–150 AD. This work, rediscovered in the 19th century, provides a unique look at Christianity in the Apostolic Age. Its instructions on baptism are as follows:

Now about baptism: this is how to baptize. Give public instruction on all these points, and then baptize in running water, in the name of the Father and of the Son and of the Holy Spirit… If you do not have running water, baptize in some other. If you cannot in cold, then in warm. If you have neither, then pour water on the head three times in the name of the Father, Son, and Holy Spirit. Before the baptism, moreover, the one who baptizes and the one being baptized must fast, and any others who can. And you must tell the one being baptized to fast for one or two days beforehand.

Commentaries, including those that distinguish immersion from submersion, typically understand that the Didache indicates a preference for baptizing by immersion, in "living water" (i.e., running water, seen as symbolic of life). Barclay observes that the Didache shows that baptism in the early church was by total immersion, if possible, Barton describes the immersion of the Didache as "ideally by total immersion", and Welch says it was by "complete immersion". In cases of insufficient water it permits pouring (affusion), which it differentiates from immersion, using the Greek word ekcheō, ("pour", in the English translation) and not baptizō ("baptize", in the English translation), but which it still considers to be a form of baptism (baptisma).

Martin and Davids say the Didache envisages "some form of immersion", and the Oxford Dictionary of the Christian Church refers its readers to its entry on immersion, which it distinguishes from submersion and affusion.

The Didache gives "the first explicit reference to baptism by pouring, although the New Testament does not exclude the possibility of this practice" Brownson says that the Didache does not state whether pouring or immersion was recommended when using running water, and Sinclair B. Ferguson argues that the only mode that the Didache mentions is affusion. Lane says that "it is probable that immersion was in fact the normal practice of baptism in the early church, but it was not regarded as an important issue", and states that the Didache does not suggest that the pouring of water was any less valid than immersion.

The Jewish-Christian sect known as the Ebionites were known to immerse themselves in a ritual bath (Hebrew: mikveh) while they were fully clothed.

== New Testament studies ==
Christian theologians such as John Piper use several parts of the New Testament to support full immersion (submersion) as the intended symbol:

1) The meaning of the word baptizo in Greek is essentially "dip" or "immerse," not sprinkle, 2) The descriptions of baptisms in the New Testament suggest that people went down into the water to be immersed rather than having water brought to them in a container to be poured or sprinkled (Matthew 3:6, "in the Jordan;" 3:16, "he went up out of the water;" John 3:23, "much water there;" Acts 8:38, "went down into the water"). 3) Immersion fits the symbolism of being buried with Christ (Romans 6:1–4; Colossians 2:12).

Piper asserts that baptism refers to the physical lowering into the water and rising in faith in part because of the reflection of this symbol in Colossians 2:12 which says "having been buried with him in baptism and raised with him through your faith in the power of God, who raised him from the dead through the glory of the Father, so we too might walk in newness of life." Others hold that there is no evidence in the New Testament that any one mode of baptism was used.

=== Criticism of the total immersion (submersion) view ===
==== Grammatical criticism ====
As criticism of the claim that, in Acts 8:38–39, which is the only reference in the New Testament to Christian baptism being administered in the open, the actions of "going down into the water" and "coming up out of the water" indicate that this baptism was by immersion, it is pointed out that "going down into" and "coming up out of" a river or a store of still water, actions there ascribed to both the baptizer and the baptized, do not necessarily involve immersion in the water. In the nineteenth century, anti-immersionist Rev. W. A. McKay wrote a polemic work against immersion baptism, arguing that it was a theological invention of the Roman Catholic Church. Differentiating between immersion and affusion, McKay held that βαπτίζω referred to affusion (which McKay understood as standing in water and having water poured over the head), as opposed to immersion. Challenging immersion baptism, he wrote:

Where is the evidence that the eunuch was dipped? "Why," cries the Baptist, "he went with Philip into the water and came out again." But is not such reasoning trifling with common sense? Do not thousands go into the water and come out again without going under the water? Is it not said that Philip went into the water and came out of it as well as the eunuch? They "both" went. If then they prove that the eunuch was immersed they prove also that Philip was immersed.

In the same passage the act of baptizing is distinguished from the going down into the water: "They both went down into the water, Philip and the eunuch, and he baptized him. And when they came up out of the water…"

As McKay and others also pointed out, the Greek preposition εἰς, here translated as "into", is the same as is used when Peter is told to go to the sea and take the first fish that came up (Matthew 17:27) and in other passages where it obviously did not imply entry of the kind that submersion involves. In fact, in the same chapter 8 of the Acts of the Apostles, the preposition εἰς appears 11 times, but only once is it commonly translated as "into"; in the other verses in which it appears it is best translated as "to". The same ambiguity pertains to the preposition ἐκ.

==== Lexical criticism ====
John Calvin (1509–1564) wrote that "it is evident that the term baptise means to immerse, and that this was the form used by the primitive Church", but in the same context (Institutes of the Christian Religion IV, xv, 19), using the same verb "immerse", but indicating that it does not necessarily mean immersing "wholly", he also wrote: "Whether the person who is baptised be wholly immersed, and whether thrice or once, or whether water be only poured or sprinkled upon him, is of no importance; Churches ought to be left at liberty in this respect, to act according to the difference of countries." Modern, professional lexicography defines βαπτίζω as dip, plunge or immerse, while giving examples of its use for merely partial immersion.

==== Syntactical criticism ====
Mark 7:3–4 and Luke 11:38 are two instances of New Testament uses of the verb baptizo outside the context of Christian baptism. One speaks of how the Pharisees do not eat unless they "wash their hands" thoroughly (nipto, the ordinary word for washing something), and, after coming from the market place, do not eat unless they "wash themselves" (literally, "baptize themselves", passive or middle voice of baptizo). The other tells how a Pharisee, at whose house Jesus ate, "was astonished to see that he did not first "wash himself" (literally, "baptize himself", aorist passive of baptizo) before dinner". Some commentaries claim that these two passages show that the word baptizo in the New Testament cannot be assumed to have the meaning "immerse".

In the first of the two passages, it is actually the hands that are specifically identified as "washed" (Mark 7:3), not the entire persons, who are described as having (literally) "baptized themselves" – Mark 7:4–5). Zodhiates identifies the meaning of baptizo here as 'immerse', even if not totally ("wash part of the body such as the hands"). but the word is rendered "wash themselves" or "purify themselves", not "baptize themselves" or "immerse themselves", by modern English Bible translations, professional commentaries, and translation guides. For the same reason, the Liddell-Scott-Jones Greek–English Lexicon (1996) cites the other passage (Luke 11:38) as an instance of the use of the word baptizo to mean "perform ablutions", not "baptize", "dip", "plunge", "immerse", and the standard lexicon of Bauer and Danker treats it as an instance of a derived meaning, "wash ceremonially for the purpose of purification", distinct from the basic meaning ("immerse") of the verb baptizo, in line with the view that Luke 11:38 cannot refer to a total immersion of the person. References to the cleaning of vessels which use baptizo also refer to immersion.

==== Hermeneutical criticism ====
The burial symbolism of Romans 6:4 and Colossians 2:12 is seen by some Christians as a reference not to the manner of baptism in water but to "a spiritual death, burial, resurrection, and new life".

== Views within Christianity ==
Forms of baptismal immersion differ widely between Christian groups. In the view of many, baptismal immersion can be either complete or partial, and adjectives such as "full", and "partial" serve to differentiate between immersion of the whole body or only of a part.

=== Eastern Churches ===
==== Eastern Orthodoxy ====
The Eastern Orthodox hold that baptism has always been by trine immersion and it is not proper to perform baptism by way of sprinkling of water. The immersion is done three times and is referred to as "total" or "full". Modern practice may vary within the Eastern Rite; Everett Ferguson cites Lothar Heiser as acknowledging: "In the present practice of infant baptism in the Greek church the priest holds the child as far under the water as possible and scoops water over the head so as to be fully covered with water", and the Oxford Dictionary of the Christian Church states that the rite "whereby part of the candidate's body was submerged in the baptismal water which was poured over the remainder ... is still found in the Eastern Church". Eastern Orthodox consider the form of baptism in which the person is placed in water as normative; only in exceptional circumstances, such as if a child is in imminent danger of death, may they baptize by affusion or, since there is always some moisture in air, perform "air baptism".

However, this radical stance appears to be nowadays increasingly nuanced in practice in several Orthodox Churches, with baptisms by pouring outside of any emergency carried out routinely for example in the Serbian Orthodox Church or occasionally by the Russian Orthodox Church, including Patriarch Kirill of Moscow himself, out of mere practical concerns.

==== Armenian Baptists ====
Baptism by partial immersion, a mode of baptism that, according to the Oxford Dictionary of the Christian Church is still found in the Eastern Church, is also the form presented in the Key of Truth, the text described as the manual of the old Armenian Baptists, which lays down that the person to be baptized "shall come on his knees into the midst of the water" and there make a profession of faith to "the elect one", who "instantly takes the water into his hands, and ... shall directly or indirectly empty out the water over the head".

==== Saint Thomas Christians ====
The Saint Thomas Christians, who trace their origin to Thomas the Apostle, used to practise immersion baptism in baptismal font. Presently, pouring is also practiced in Syro-Malabar Church along with immersion.

=== Roman Catholicism ===
According to the Catechism of the Catholic Church,

"Baptism is performed in the most expressive way by triple immersion in the baptismal water. However, from ancient times it has also been able to be conferred by pouring the water three times over the candidate's head"

=== Protestantism ===
==== Anabaptists ====
Anabaptists ("re-baptizers") practice adult baptism, or "believer's baptism".

Anabaptists were given that name because of performing baptism on people whom others, but not the Anabaptists, considered to be already baptized. They did not accept infant baptism as true baptism. Anabaptists perform baptisms indoors in a baptismal font, baptistry, or outdoors in a creek or river. The mode of believer's baptism for most Anabaptists is by pouring (which is normative in Mennonite, Amish and Hutterite churches). Some, however, such as the Mennonite Brethren Church, Schwarzenau Brethren and River Brethren use immersion. The Schwarzenau Brethren, an Anabaptist denomination, teach that the ordinance "be trine immersion, that is, dipping three times forward in the name of the Father, the Son, and the Holy Spirit." The three plunges in the forward position, for each person of the Holy Trinity, also represent the "three days of Christ's burial." Immersion baptism is done falling forward by the Schwarzenau Brethren because "the Bible says Jesus bowed his head (letting it fall forward) and died. Baptism represents a dying of the old, sinful self."

Conservative Mennonite Anabaptists count baptism to be one of the seven ordinances. In Anabaptist theology, baptism is a part of the process of salvation. For Anabaptists, "believer's baptism consists of three parts, the Spirit, the water, and the blood – these three witnesses on earth." According to Anabaptist theology: (1) In believer's baptism, the Holy Spirit witnesses the candidate entering into a covenant with God. (2) God, in believer's baptism, "grants a baptized believer the water of baptism as a sign of His covenant with them – that such a one indicates and publicly confesses that he wants to live in true obedience towards God and fellow believers with a blameless life." (3) Integral to believer's baptism is the candidate's mission to witness to the world even unto martyrdom, echoing Jesus' words that “they would be baptized with His baptism, witnessing to the world when their blood was spilt.”

==== Baptists ====
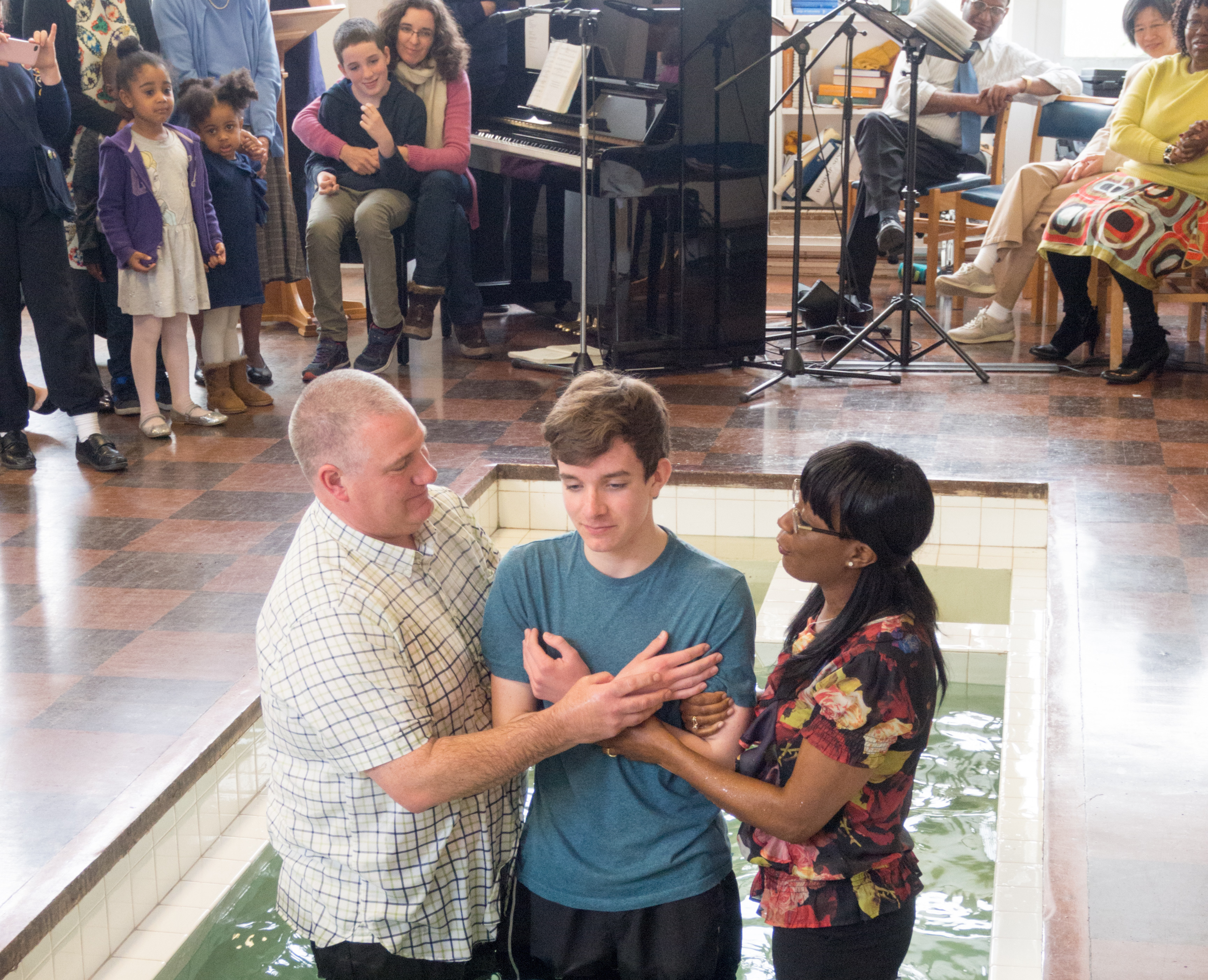
Believer's baptism of adult by immersion, Northolt Park Baptist Church, in Greater London, Baptist Union of Great Britain, 2015

Immersion baptism, understood as demanding total submersion of the body, is required by Baptists (although this was not the case before 1641), as enunciated in the 1689 Baptist Catechism: "Baptism is rightly administered by immersion, or dipping the whole body of the person in water, in the name of the Father, and of the Son, and of the Holy Spirit", indicating that the whole body must be immersed, not just the head.

Baptism, they believe, does not accomplish anything in itself, but is an outward personal sign or testimony that the person's sins have already been washed away by the blood of Christ shed on the cross. It is considered a covenantal act, signifying entrance into the New Covenant of Christ.

==== Disciples of Christ and Churches of Christ ====
Baptism by submersion is practised by the Christian Church (Disciples of Christ), but most of them do not suggest rebaptism of those who have undergone a baptism of a different Christian tradition. Baptism in Churches of Christ, which also have roots in the Restoration Movement, is performed only by bodily immersion. This is based on their understanding of the meaning of the word baptizo as used in the New Testament, a belief that it more closely conforms to the death, burial and resurrection of Jesus, and that historically immersion was the mode used in the 1st century, and that pouring and sprinkling later emerged as secondary modes when immersion was not possible.

==== Pentecostalism ====
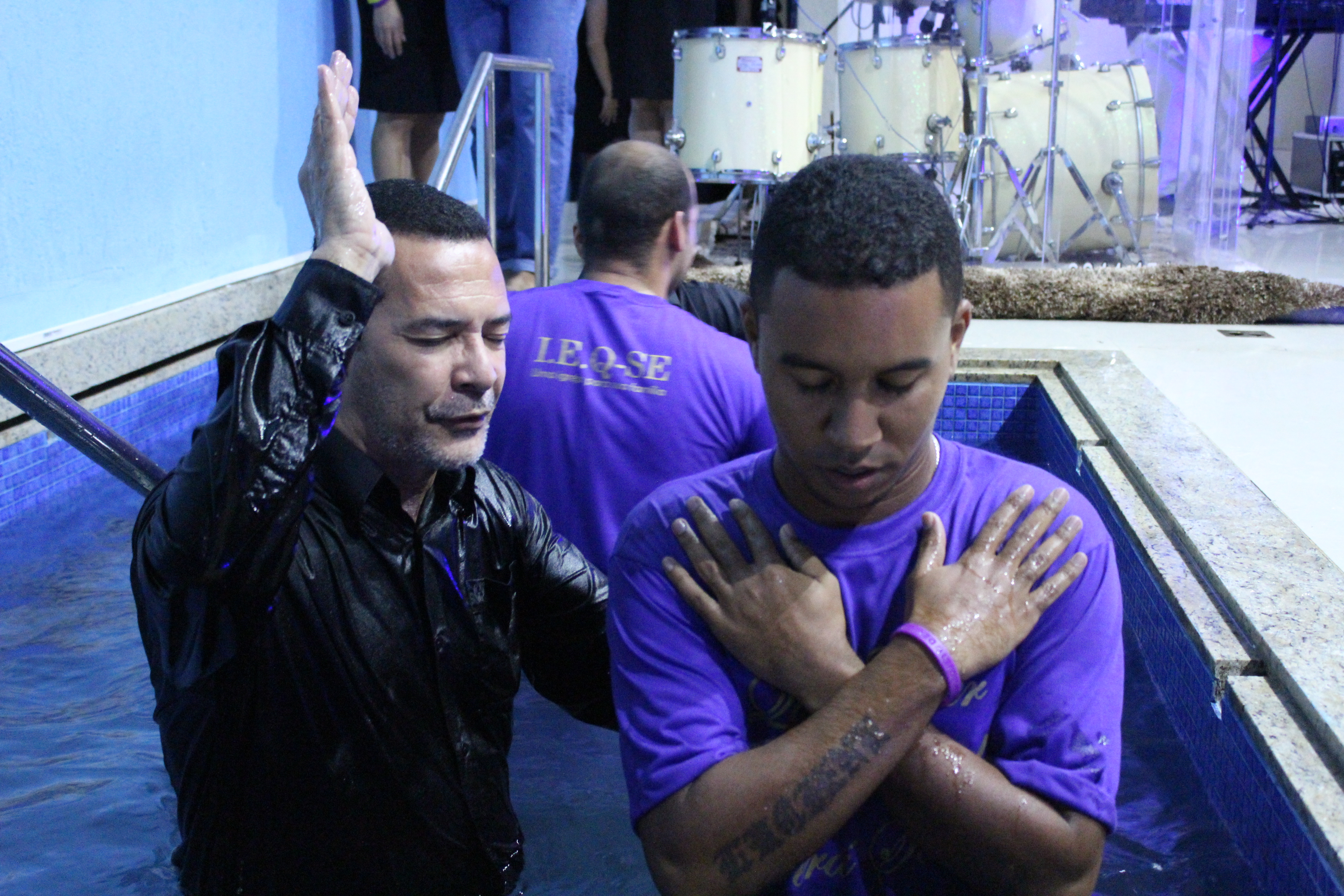
Believer's baptism of adult by immersion at The Foursquare Church in Aracaju, Brazil, 2015

Pentecostalism, which emerged around 1906, practice the believer's baptism by full immersion.

==== Seventh-day Adventists ====
Seventh-day Adventists believe that "baptism symbolizes dying to self and coming alive in Jesus." Seventh-day Adventists teach that it symbolizes and declares a member's new faith in Christ and trust in His forgiveness. Buried in the water, the member arises to a new life in Jesus, empowered by the Holy Spirit. Adventists practice full immersion baptism. In full immersion, baptism is representative of a death to self and a rise into new life in Christ and a cleansing from sin. It is a public declaration of a changed life, a relationship with Jesus, and a desire to follow Him fully.

==== Sabbath Rest Adventists ====
Sabbath Rest Adventists adhere to full immersion in baptism as a symbol of the death of "the old man".

==== Optional immersion baptism ====
Major Protestant groups in which baptism by total or partial immersion is optional, although not typical, include Anglicans, Lutherans, Presbyterians, Methodists, and the Church of the Nazarene.

=== The Church of Jesus Christ of Latter-day Saints ===
Official explanations concerning baptism state: “we are baptized by being lowered under water and raised back up by a person who has authority from God to do so. This action symbolizes Jesus Christ's death, burial, and resurrection, and it also represents the end of our old lives and beginning a new life as His disciples.” Doctrine and Covenants 20:72-74) gives the authoritative declaration on mode:

72 Baptism is to be administered in the following manner unto all those who repent–

73 The person who is called of God and has authority from Jesus Christ to baptize, shall go down into the water with the person who has presented himself or herself for baptism, and shall say, calling him or her by name: Having been commissioned of Jesus Christ, I baptize you in the name of the Father, and of the Son, and of the Holy Ghost. Amen.

74 Then shall he immerse him or her in the water, and come forth again out of the water.

Baptism by immersion is the only way to be completely accepted as a member, either converted to or raised in the church; no other form is accepted in The Church of Jesus Christ of Latter-day Saints. Baptism for the dead is also performed in their temples, to provide this ordinance to those who did not have the opportunity in life, or were physically unable, post mortem, for them to accept as they will. It is performed the same way, with a child or volunteer standing in for the deceased individual.

=== The Community of Christ ===
The Community of Christ, formerly known as the Reorganized Church of Jesus Christ of Latter Day Saints, practices baptism by submersion.

=== Jehovah's Witnesses ===
Complete immersion of the person in water is considered necessary by Jehovah's Witnesses.

== Mandaean baptism ==
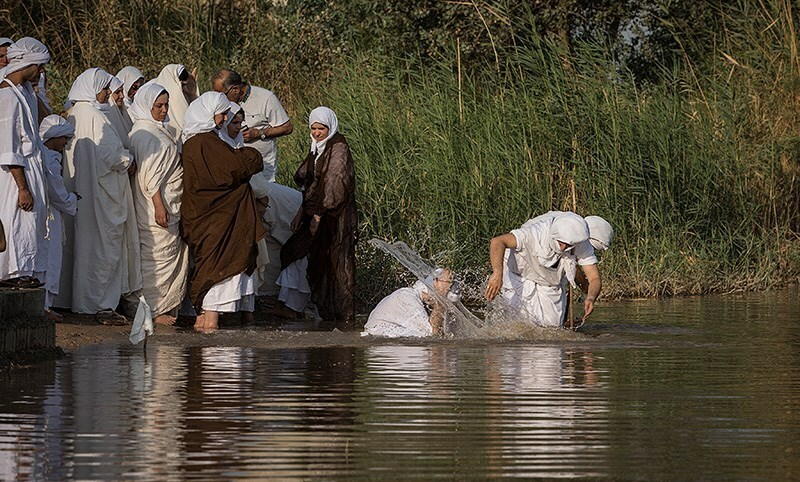
Mandaean full immersion baptism in living water

Mandaeans revere John the Baptist and practice frequent baptism (masbuta) as a ritual of purification, not of initiation. They are possibly the earliest people to practice baptism. Mandaeans undergo baptism on Sundays (Habshaba), wearing a white sacral robe (rasta). Baptism for Mandaeans consists of a triple full immersion in water, a triple signing of the forehead with water and a triple drinking of water. The priest (rabbi) then removes a ring made of myrtle worn by the baptized and places it on their forehead. This is then followed by a handshake (kushta- hand of truth) with the priest. The final blessing involves the priest laying his right hand on the baptized person's head. Living water (fresh, natural, flowing water) is a requirement for baptism, therefore can only take place in rivers. All rivers are named Jordan (Yardena) and are believed to be nourished by the World of Light. By the river bank, a Mandaean's forehead is anointed with sesame oil (misha) and partakes in a communion of bread (pihta) and water. Baptism for Mandaeans allows for salvation by connecting with the World of Light and for forgiveness of sins.

== Sethian Five Seals ==
While some scholars consider the Five Seals mentioned in Sethian Gnostic texts to be literary symbolism rather than an actual religious ritual, Birger A. Pearson believes that the Five Seals refer to an actual ritual in which the initiate was ritually immersed in water five times. Pearson also finds many parallels between the Sethian ritual of the Five Seals and the Mandaean baptismal ritual of masbuta.

== Immersion in other religious groups ==
=== Judaism ===
Self-administered immersion is used for ritual cleansing, and as a rite of passage for proselytes.

== See also ==
- Masbuta
- Ritual purification
