= Stephen Emmel =

Stephen Emmel is an American Coptologist and musician.

== Academic career ==
Stephen Emmel was born in Rochester, NY, 27 June 1952, and earned his B.A. from Syracuse University in 1973 (department of religion). He began graduate study with James M. Robinson, who took Emmel with him to Cairo, Egypt, in 1974 as a research assistant in the international project to publish the Coptic Gnostic texts of the Nag Hammadi Codices. Emmel lived in Egypt 1974–77 in order to complete the conservation of the Nag Hammadi papyri in the Coptic Museum and to assist in the publication of both a facsimile edition of the Nag Hammadi Codices and an English-language edition and translation of the texts contained in them. During those years he traveled several times to Jerusalem to meet with the Egyptologist and linguist H. J. Polotsky in order to deepen his knowledge of Coptic grammar.

In 1978 Emmel resumed his graduate study, now with Bentley Layton at Yale University, where in 1980 he discovered a part of Nag Hammadi Codex III in the Beinecke Rare Book and Manuscript Library, which had acquired the previously unidentified fragment in 1964 among a group of miscellaneous papyri. Emmel's first major publication was an edition of the Nag Hammadi text "The Dialogue of the Saviour" (1984). At about that same time, he became the first scholar to see the now famous Gnostic scripture titled "The Gospel of Judas," in what is now called the Codex Tchacos, when it was offered for sale in 1983 in Geneva, Switzerland. However, in the short time allowed, Emmel did not see the title "The Gospel of Judas" in the papyrus manuscript and so was not the first person to identify the text as such. Nevertheless, when the National Geographic Society was considering a project to fund the conservation and publication of the Codex Tchacos in 2004, Emmel was asked to join its "Codex Advisory Panel," and he also appeared in the society's much publicized documentary about the Gospel of Judas project.

Emmel earned his Ph.D. from Yale University in 1993 (department of religious studies, program in the study of ancient Christianity). His doctoral dissertation, "Shenoute's Literary Corpus" (published in 2004), laid the groundwork for his current main research preoccupation, which is an international collaborative project to publish the writings of the ancient Coptic monastic leader Shenoute the Archimandrite (ca. 347–465). In 1996 Emmel was appointed professor of Coptology at the Institute of Egyptology and Coptology at the University of Münster in Germany. During the academic year 2010–11 he was on leave of absence from the University of Münster in order to serve as the first full-time professor of Coptology at the American University in Cairo.

In 1976 Emmel became a charter member of the International Association for Coptic Studies, whose first international congress (Cairo, December 1976) he helped to organize; between 1996 and 2000 he served as the association's president, and since 2000 he has been its secretary. He was a founding editor of the Journal of Coptic Studies (Leuven: Peeters, 1988–2001 with Gerald M. Browne), and he has helped to edit several scientific monograph series. In 2012, Emmel was appointed "Socio Straniero" ("Foreign member") of the Italian Accademia Nazionale dei Lincei (Rome).

== Music as a hobby ==
Emmel began singing and playing piano and guitar in his youth and has maintained music-making as a hobby. An acquaintanceship with David Tibet via a common interest in the Coptic language (Tibet has an M.A. in Coptic studies from Macquarie University) resulted in Emmel performing on stage with Tibet's band Current 93 several times during 2007–10. A part of one of those performances was recorded and released in 2008.

== Major Scientific Works ==
- Emmel, Stephen. "Text and Translation" and "Indexes." In: Nag Hammadi Codex III,5: The Dialogue of the Savior, edited by Stephen Emmel, pp. 37–127. Nag Hammadi Studies, vol. 26. Leiden: E. J. Brill, 1984.
- Emmel, Stephen. Shenoute's Literary Corpus. 2 vols. Corpus Scriptorum Christianorum Orientalium, vols. 599–600 (= Subsidia, vols. 111–112). Leuven: Peeters, 2004.
