= Letter of Peter to Philip =

Gnostic writing

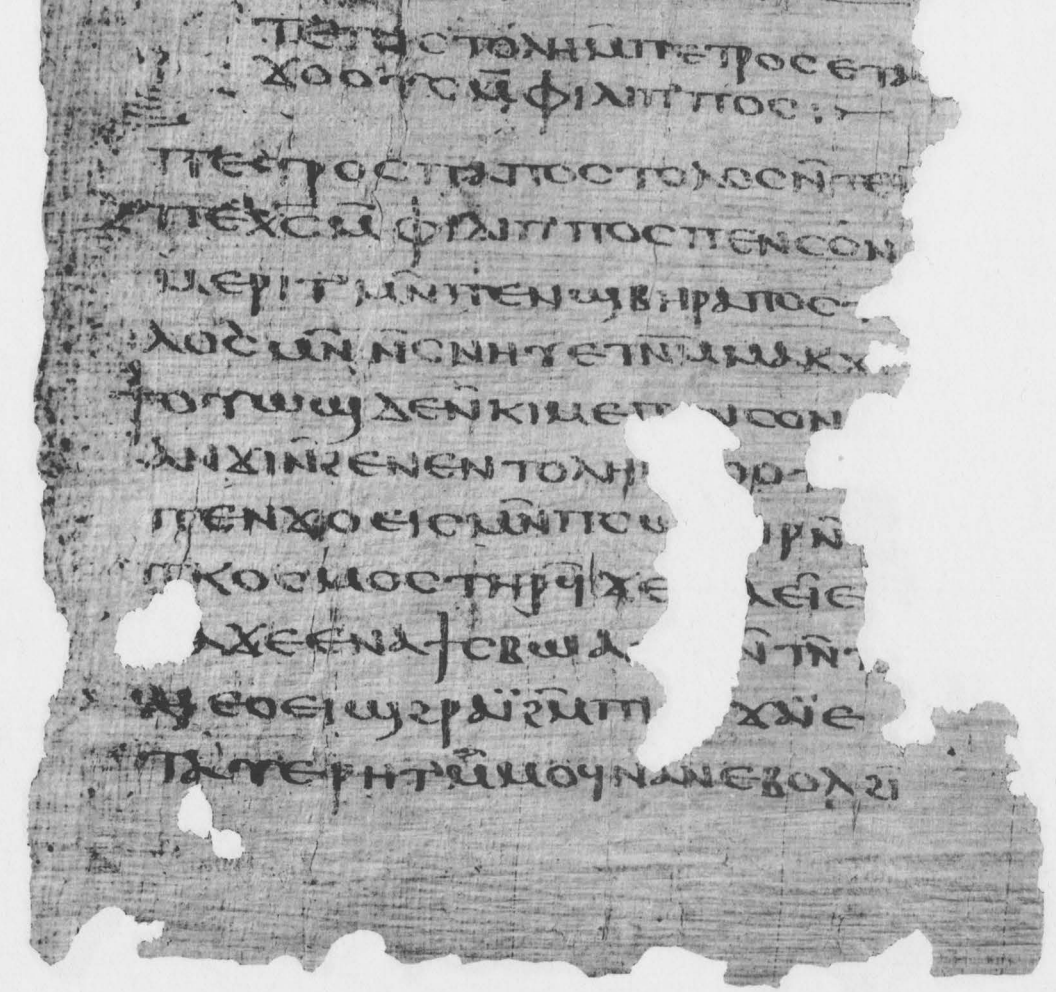
The beginning of the work in Codex VIII of the Nag Hammadi library. It begins on the lower half of page 132.

The Letter of Peter to Philip (Note: Coptic: Tepistolē pa Petros ša Phillipos (Codex Tchacos). The Nag Hammadi Codex VIII version reads Tepistolēempetros etafjoous emphillipos, literally "The Letter of Peter Which He Sent To Philip".) is a Gnostic writing. It was initially discovered as the second tractate in Codex VIII of the Nag Hammadi library. The tractate is a Coptic translation of a Greek original. An additional copy of the text, also written in Coptic, was later found in Codex Tchacos. The author of the original Greek text is unknown, but it was probably written in the late 2nd or early 3rd century.

The work begins as a putative epistle to Philip the Apostle, its authorship pseudepigraphically attributed to the apostle Peter. However, this is more of a framing device, and the narrative quickly changes to a dialogue between Jesus Christ and the disciples. In practice it is more of an apocalypse, revealing secrets from Christ in the form of a dialogue recorded in a letter.

== Summary ==
The work can be divided into two sections. The first is the letter from Peter to Philip (most likely Philip the Apostle, but perhaps a composite character combined with Philip the Evangelist), found in 132,12-133,8 in the Nag Hammadi version; the second is an account of a dialogue between the apostles, Peter, and the resurrected Christ, which spans 133,8-140,27 in the Nag Hammadi version. Philip is treated as an anonymous member of the group in the second section, with the apostles treated as a collective.

Peter writes to Philip regarding commands from the savior to teach and preach about salvation. Peter writes that Philip is currently separated from the others, and asks him to come. Philip goes to Peter, and the group of apostles gather on Mount Olivet, pray to God, and ask for strength as they fear being killed. A great light appears, and a voice reveals itself to be Jesus.

The apostles ask Jesus about the deficiency of the realms and their fullness (pleroma), their detention in the dwelling place, why they face opposition from the powers of this world, and how they can leave and gain the "authority of boldness". Jesus responds and explains that the deficiency of the aeons occurred when the disobedience and foolishness of the mother led to the establishment of eternal realms. (Note: Probably a loose reference to the story of Sophia seen in the Apocryphon of John. However, other references to "the mother" and her fall might be references to Eve. It is also possible the Mother is an intentionally ambiguous reference to both.) The "Arrogant One" (Note: Probably a reference or parallel story to Yaldabaoth, the chief archon, detailed in the Apocryphon of John.) followed her, took over part of the aeons, placed powers and authorities (archons) over it, and confined his portion within the mortal realms. The Arrogant One grew proud and created mortal bodies, but they were twisted misrepresentations of true forms.

Jesus says that he was sent to Earth in the body for the sake of those who have fallen away. Jesus says that those who are detained are his, and that they will become luminaries once they strip themselves of what is corruptible. He also says that the powers fight against the inner person and that they must be fought against by teaching salvation in the world and with the aid of the Father. Lightning and thunder appear, and Jesus is taken up to heaven.

The apostles return to Jerusalem. As they walk, they discuss both Jesus's suffering and their own suffering. Peter says that as Jesus suffered for them, and they must also suffer. The apostles go to the temple, teach salvation in Jesus' name, and heal people. Peter prays to Jesus to give them a spirit of understanding and the power to perform great deeds. The apostles are filled with the Holy Spirit, perform healings, and go to preach. Jesus appears again and tells them not to be afraid, that he is with them forever, and that they will have joy, grace, and power.

== Authorship and date ==
The author of the letter is unknown. The surviving copies are a Coptic language translation of a Koine Greek original, likely written in the late 2nd century or the early 3rd century (c. 200 AD). The origin of the author is likewise unknown, but Alexandria in Roman Egypt, or perhaps Roman Syria, would be reasonable guesses given the locations where Gnosticism seems to have been prominent. The variety of Coptic is Sahidic Coptic, although a few passages show signs of Bohairic Coptic.

While it is speculative, the concern with suffering the letter contains – there is a prayer for strength and discussion of how the evil archons rule the world – suggests that either the author, the intended readers, or both may have been directly familiar with persecution.

== Manuscripts ==
There are two surviving manuscripts containing the Letter of Peter to Philip. The first one rediscovered in the modern era is the second tractate in Codex VIII of the Nag Hammadi library. The Nag Hammadi library was discovered in 1945, but due to a variety of reasons, it was not until 1976 that a reproduction of Codex VIII was published and available to the public. The manuscript is held in the Coptic Museum in Old Cairo. The section of Codex VIII with the Letter of Peter to Philip is 8 pages long, from the middle of page 132 to page 140. It follows Zostrianos, but does not appear to have strong literary or theological connections with that tractate. The manuscript's condition is largely intact, with only a few pages damaged.

The second copy is found in Codex Tchacos, which was said to be discovered in 1978 near Maghagha in the Minya Governorate of Egypt. The codex sat unanalyzed by scholars for two decades, though, in the hands of an Egyptian antiquities dealer. The codex was acquired in 2001 by the Maecenas Foundation for Ancient Art, and released to the general public in 2006 after being acquired by National Geographic. The pagination of Codex Tchacos is somewhat uncertain – the manuscript had been treated poorly at first and separated into separate leaves, requiring painstaking reconstruction work – but it is found at the start of the codex on pages 1–9.

In general, the two copies match each other quite closely where they can be compared. By contrast, the Codex Tchacos's version of the First Revelation of James differs in more passages from the Nag Hammadi version, suggesting that while James had a different Coptic translation, the same base translation was used for this letter in both documents. An example of a difference is that the Codex Tchacos version attributes the creation of the aeons to the "Great One", while the Nag Hammadi text attributes the creation of aeons to the Mother.

== Analysis ==
=== Genre ===
The work exhibits several genres. While it opens as an epistle, the work rapidly sheds this structure and does not return to it. Instead, the work becomes a narrative of the activities of the apostles (similar to the first half of the Book of Acts) as part of the literary genre of Apostolic Acts. It also narrates a conversation between Jesus and the apostles, a form also called a "dialogue gospel" or erotapokriseis. This dialogue structure is common to other Gnostic literature. The revelations from Christ in the dialogue also relate to works of apocalyptic literature.

Henriette Havelaar argues that the Gnostic Apocalypse of Peter, another Nag Hammadi work, is the closest text to the letter, despite the difference in genre. Both feature a prominent role for Peter and discuss suffering in a Gnostic context. Still, there does not appear to be a direct literary connection between them; neither quotes the other. Hans–Gebhard Bethge suggests that the non-Gnostic Acts of Philip provide useful background and parallels for early Christian legends concerning Philip, and that this letter is something of a "Gnostic Acts of Philip".

=== Role of Peter ===
Peter is depicted as the leader and spokesman of the apostles, and appears to have his own personal disciples. The work considers Peter the primary authority on doctrine, a stance common in proto-orthodox Christianity that apparently influenced some groups of Gnostics but not others. For the author, Peter legitimized and promoted Gnostic views. The letter does stand in contrast to some other Gnostic works which portray Peter less positively, such as the Gospel of Judas.

While the reference to Peter as author naturally suggests a Petrine-tradition document, Michael Kaler argues an alternative stance: that the work is more Pauline and that it draws on the account of the apostle Paul's revelation in Acts 9.

Marvin Meyer argues that the letter shares several key features with a letter found early in the Pseudo-Clementines. The Clementines are prefixed by a putative letter of Peter addressed to James the Just. Both letters attest to the authority of Peter, and prefix a discussion among the apostles. While distinctions between Gnostic groups are speculative, Meyer suggests that parts of the letter seem to reflect at least some themes and terms of Sethian Gnosticism seen in works such as the Apocryphon of John. He cautions that the similarities are not overwhelming with more strongly Sethian-affiliated texts, though.

While the early Church was interested in Petrine writings, the framing device of the work being a letter was rare, as Peter was generally reputed more as a preacher and church leader than a letter writer in early Christianity. Most of the work is a dialogue, which was a more common way of relaying stories about Peter.

=== Soteriology ===
The letter opens with a charge to preach concerning salvation and Jesus to the world. The work is somewhat vague on the point, but could be read as having a more universalistic bent, with the apostles preaching to crowds concerning salvation. It seems to suggest that Jesus is a potential redeemer for all, although not all are redeemed, given the distinction between "one who is mine" and others in the text. If this is accurate, such a soteriology would differ from other Gnostic works which seem to portray salvation as only applying to a chosen few.

=== Suffering and docetism ===
My brothers, Jesus is a stranger to this suffering. But we are the ones who have suffered through the transgression of the mother. And because of this, he did everything like us. (Nag Hammadi VIII version)

Jesus is a stranger to death. But we are the ones who have died due to the transgression of the Mother. And for this reason [he did] everything symbolically for us. (Codex Tchacos version)

— Letter of Peter to Philip, 139,21-25 (NHCVIII,2); 8,2-7 (Codex Tchacos). Translated Marvin Meyer.

The work's stance on suffering, where Peter writes that a revelatory voice told him it was necessary for him to suffer, might suggest a non-docetic theology. It is difficult to know for sure, but some other works in the Nag Hammadi library, such as the Gnostic Apocalypse of Peter, are both docetic and portray Peter as invincible, while the Letter of Peter to Philip accepts Christian traditions of Peter suffering. However, it also writes that Jesus is a "stranger" to suffering, but that he suffered anyway to be "like" us – perhaps a compromise position that could allow both a docetic and non-docetic reading. Scholars have different interpretations for whether the writer was implying the suffering was genuine, or only a likeness.

=== Inter-Christian theological debates ===
Pamela Reaves argues that there are subtle references to inter-Christian discord addressed by the letter, similar to the overt denunciation of other Christians in the Gnostic Apocalypse of Peter. The letter indicates that the disciples had heard Jesus's message when he was alive, and that this message was valid, but some had misinterpreted it, hence needing to hear it again after the resurrection of Jesus, with additional tweaks to make clear various points of doctrine were indeed supported by both Christ and Peter. In other words, the letter's version of Christianity was the correct one, and always had been. The text mentions those who do not recognize Jesus's true nature: probably a reference to lower cosmic forces aligned with the Arrogant One, but perhaps also simultaneously a denunciation of Christians with the "wrong" theology who misunderstand Jesus. While the work seeks to mediate differences and emphasizes the unity of the apostolic collective, it could also be seen as attempting to "correct" invalid theology.

Karen Leigh King cautions that if read without knowledge of its origins, the great majority of the letter would be unobjectionable to proto-orthodox Christians, and that scholars should not read too much assumed Gnosticism into the letter. The only theological point it notably strays from what would become later Christian theology is in placing the cause of suffering squarely on evil powers who conspired before the world even began, corrupting the world and estranging it from God, rather than the more usual emphasis on human sin.

== Translations ==
Selected translations of the Letter of Peter to Philip into English include:

- "The Letter of Peter to Philip". New Testament Apocrypha: Volume One: Gospels and Related Writings. Translated by Bethge, Hans–Gebhard; Wilson, Robert McLachlan. Westminster John Knox Press. 1991. pp. 342–353. ISBN 0-664-22721-X. (Bethge did the translation of Coptic to German, Wilson the translation from German to English)
- The Letter of Peter to Philip: Text, Translation, and Commentary. SBL Dissertation Series 53. Translated by Meyer, Marvin W. Scholars Press. 1981. pp. 17–33.
- "The Letter of Peter to Philip". The Nag Hammadi Scriptures. Translated by Meyer, Marvin W. HarperOne. 2007. pp. 585–593.
- Robinson, James M., ed. (1988) [1981]. "The Letter of Peter to Philip (VIII, 2)". The Nag Hammadi Library in English. Translated by Wisse, Frederik (Third ed.). Harper & Row. pp. 431–437.
- Sieber, John H., ed. (1991). "NHC VIII,2: The Letter of Peter to Philip". Nag Hammadi Codex VIII. NHMS 31. Translated by Wisse, Frederik. Introduction by Marvin W. Meyer. Brill. pp. 227–251. doi:10.1163/9789004438965_004. ISBN 978-90-04-09477-2.

A translation of the Codex Tchacos version can be found at:

- "The Letter of Peter to Philip". The Gospel of Judas: Together with the Letter of Peter to Philip, James, and a Book of Allogenes from Codex Tchacos: Critical edition. Translated by Meyer, Marvin W.; Gaudard, François. National Geographic. 2007. pp. 92–109. ISBN 9781426201912.
