= The Origins of Early Christian Literature =

2021 history book by Robyn Faith Walsh

- Author: Robyn Faith Walsh
- Language: English
- Subject: Early Christianity; Oral gospel traditions
- Publisher: Cambridge University Press
- Publication date: 2021
- Publication place: United Kingdom
- Media type: Print (hardback, paperback), ebook
- Pages: xix + 225
- ISBN: 9781108835305 Hardback

The Origins of Early Christian Literature: Contextualizing the New Testament within Greco-Roman Literary Culture is a history monograph written by Robyn Faith Walsh which was published by Cambridge University Press in 2021. The text covers the contexts of early Christian literature and proposes alternative theses for the origins of the gospels—primarily the Synoptic Gospels—premised on their authorship by an elite in contrast to the oral gospel traditions thesis.

== Contents ==
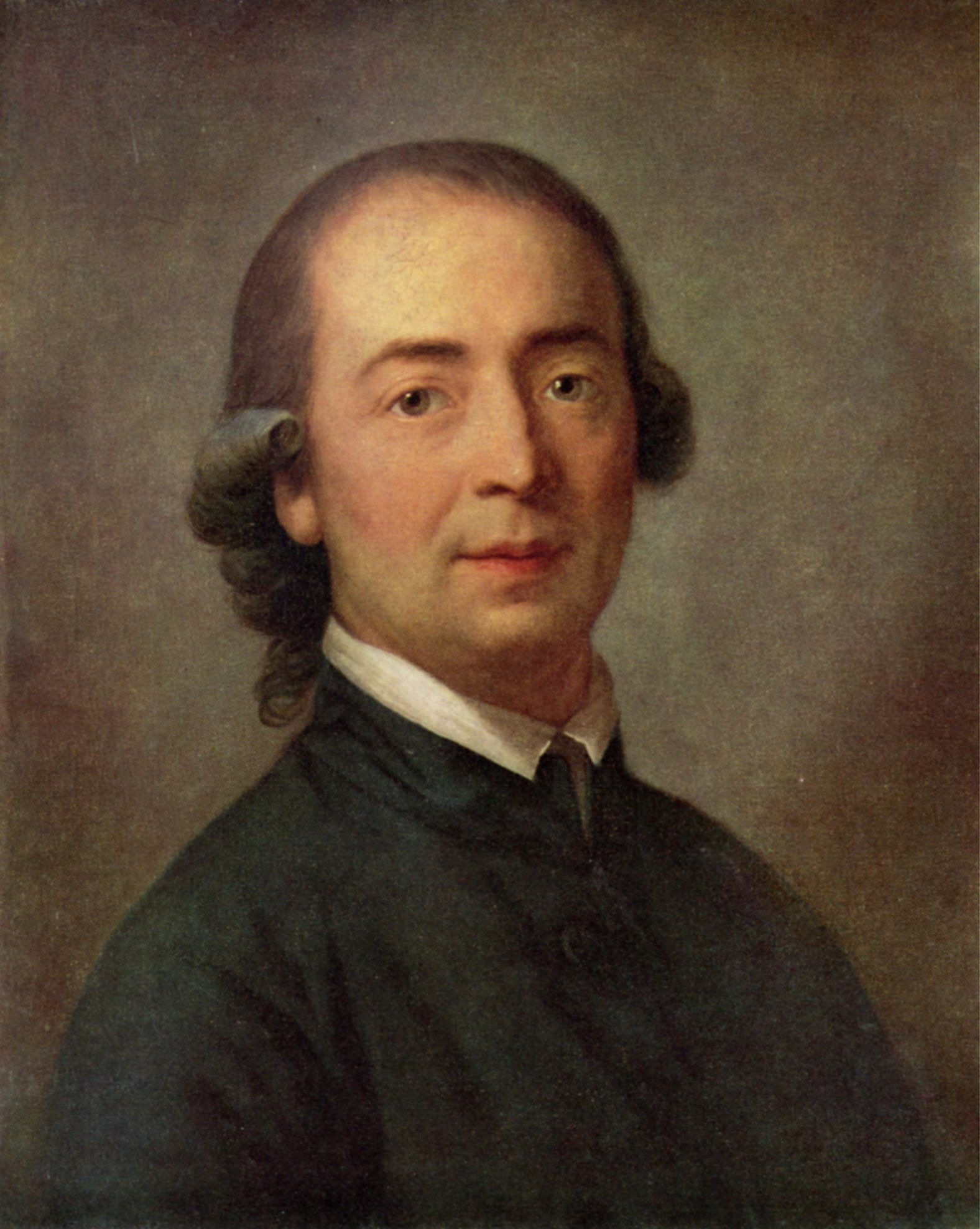
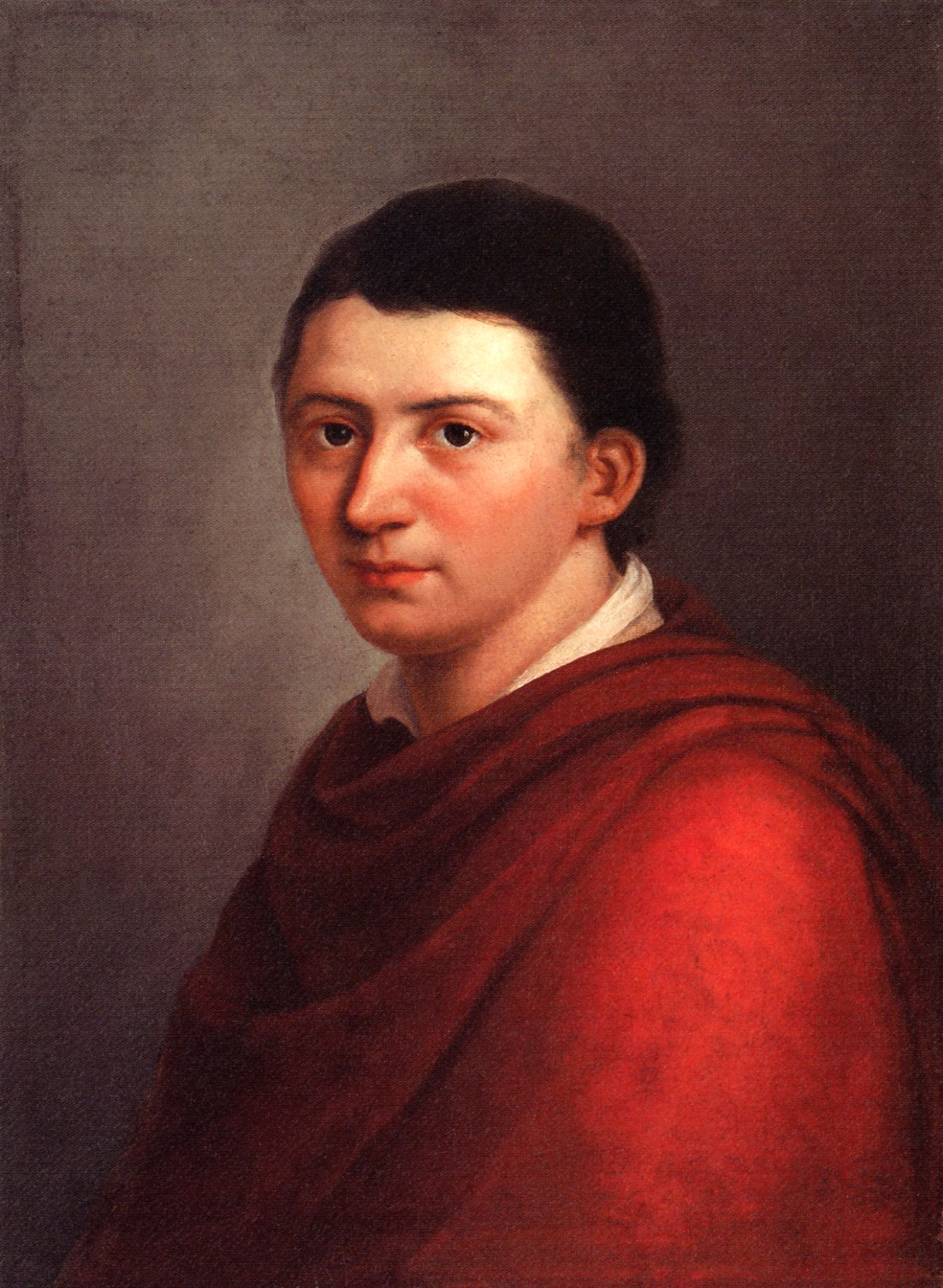
Johann Gottfried Herder (left) and Friedrich Schlegel (right), German Romanticists who Walsh credits with establishing assumptions in gospel analysis that persist to the modern day

In the opening chapter of The Origins of Early Christian Literature, author Robyn Faith Walsh began by "problematizing" a notion perpetuated through Acts of the Apostles and scholarly presumptions regarding the Jesus movement; Walsh referred to this as the "Big Bang 'myth' of Christian origins". Walsh criticized the three presumptions of this theory: that Christianity experienced early and explosive growth, that it was institutionally well-developed within its first century, and that discrete Christian communities formed. Walsh critiqued this view as established by 2nd-century "inventors or myth-makers" who wrote Acts. Part of the basis for her view is that religion is a modern concept from the Enlightenment era and it is misused in anachronistic manner by modern scholars when applied to the ancient world. She believes that individuals from the Jesus movement in the first century were not thinking in terms of "religion" or differentiating from things like "Judaism" and "Christianity".

Walsh then traced the influence of German Romanticism, particularly the thought of Johann Gottfried Herder and Friedrich Schlegel, on establishing the presumption that the gospels can inform thinking regarding Early Christian communities. Walsh contended that this presumption survives within modern scholarship. Walsh has argued that earlier studies have missed aspects of early Christian social development "by only focusing on the presumed Christian communities of these authors rather than also on what we know about ancient authorship practices in general".

Walsh's assessment in the book was that only early Christian scholarship formally adopts modern conceptions of cohesive community to describe Christianity in its first century, in contrast with norms in other classical scholarship. Early 19th-century German Romanticism, according to Walsh, reflected contemporary conflicts between Protestants and Catholics: German Protestants articulated early Christians as comparable to the Volk with a Geist struggling against an elite and corrupt Rome. Rudolf Bultmann's work was the primary reference for Walsh's analysis of German Romantic influence.

Walsh also held that the gospel authors should be interpreted as "elite cultural producers writing for other elite culture producers". These authors, according to Walsh, established the narrative of Jesus's life with their idiosyncratic stylizations. Walsh holds that these elite authors were writing with influence from and in exchange with their cultural context. Walsh has pointed to the low literacy rates of the Roman Empire and the literary creativity of the gospels as evidence of possible elite authorship.

In the book, Walsh also argued that the literary genre of the gospels is best described as "subversive biography", a view supported by David Konstan. Unlike "civic biographies", which promoted "dominant social values", subversive biographies "depict colorful events in the lives of the protagonists". Protagonists of subversive biographies lead "colorful" lives, use cunning to outwit opponents, and ultimately meet an early or tragic death. Comparing the Synoptic Gospels to other subversive biographies, Walsh asserted that the specifics of Jesus's portrayal was not the product of an oral tradition but instead the "reflection of the rational interests of elite, imperial writers". Walsh, noting that subversive biographies are typically largely fictional, further challenged the approach of using the gospels to derive insights on early Christian communities.

This categorization also places the gospels in the tradition of Greek and Hellenistic biographies, rather than within Jewish folklore. According to Walsh's argument in the book, references to eyewitnesses like that made in the preface to the Gospel of Luke are literary topoi while the missing body of the crucified Jesus is a motif to express divinity. These thematic similarities with other Greco-Roman literature, according to Walsh, means searching for an oral gospel tradition is based on a false presumption. These oral traditions, according to Walsh, "are irretrievable to us, if they existed at all". Walsh also used comparisons between the gospels and other contemporary literature, including the Satyrica, to emphasize literary exchange.

== Critical reception ==
Matthias Becker, reviewing the book for the journal Klio, remarked that Walsh's argument was "clearly structured, well-written and extremely stimulating" in its analysis of the Synoptic Gospels. However, Becker critiqued the work as too "one-sided" and challenged Walsh's presentation of classical authorship as one of an "independent ... 'rational agent'". He also found that the ecclesiology explicitly established in Acts of the Apostles directly contradicts and renders "unfounded" Walsh's thesis of a non-cohesive "Jesus people".

In a review of The Origins of Early Christian Literature for Studies in Religion/Sciences Religieuses, Zeba Crook said "there is much to admire about this work" and that it "extends the legacy of J. Z. Smith", a historian of religion who died in 2017. Crook also found strength in Walsh's contention that the gospel writers most likely came from elite literary culture. However, Crook suggests that Paul the Apostle presents as a counterexample of a "literary specialist" living within early Christian communities, suggesting that Paul-like figures may have been responsible for the gospels. Crook also found Walsh's model of gospel authorship deficient in resolving the synoptic problem.

Finding Walsh's work "a refreshing edge in that it challenges so many deeply held assumptions and traditional goals of scholarship on the gospels", Brent Nongbri's review for the Bryn Mawr Classical Review also found that "the issue of authorship deserves more nuance" and criticized the book for its "uneven quality". Nongbri pointed to the "ambivalence" of authorship in contemporaneous Roman literature and found that "the relationship between a written text and oral teachings can be less neat than Walsh’s bifurcated model allows". Although "unpersuaded" by some of Walsh's arguments, Nongbri found that the chapters in which Walsh made her more novel arguments "make for stimulating reading. The book is highly provocative and should elicit spirited debate among New Testament scholars."

Christopher W. Skinner, a professor of the New Testament and early Christianity at Loyola University Chicago, found Walsh's identification of the gospels as Greco-Roman biographies problematic because the previous consensus on this matter had eroded in the previous few years and needs more justification. In his review for The Journal of Theological Studies, he also wondered whether ignoring parallels from important Jewish literature was good practice, since Walsh is dismissive of recent evidence from orality and performance studies. Mark's Greek and his consistent Semitic interference made it hard for Skinner to imagine especially his gospel as a product of the elite circle that Walsh described. He states that Walsh's thesis "has tremendous explanatory power, especially for those tempted to downplay questions related to orality and ancient performance," and was possibly the beginning of a "paradigm shift among gospel scholars thinking about this question". Yet Skinner states "I remain unconvinced by Walsh’s argument on several fronts and a few questions remain."

Alan Kirk objected to Walsh's view that the theorized Q source is a primarily Greco-Roman work, questioning how her view accounts for the traction the gospels found amongst early Christians. He argued that "[Sarah] Rollens, on the other hand, with her 'peasant intellectuals' analog has a model in hand much superior to Walsh's in its capacity to size up Q as the literary mediation of a tradition that is culturally and morally formative for networks of Jesus followers. It also maintains Jewish Palestine as its likely place of origins". He pointed to John Kloppenborg's work as demonstrating that the patterns of the Synoptic tradition are very different from those of Greco-Roman literature.

Richard Carrier, a historian of ancient history known for his fringe skepticism, lauded Walsh's work on building her dissertation at Brown University into The Origins of Early Christian Literature, calling the monograph "excellent work". Like other reviewers he observed that many of the ideas in the book had been argued by earlier generations of scholars.
