= Nathalie Bosson =

Swiss Egyptologist, Coptologist and archaeologist

- Born: 1963 (age 62–63)

Academic background
- Education: University of Geneva
- Thesis: The 'Milanese' variety of the Middle Egyptian Coptic dialect: Dialectal analysis accompanied by the complete re-edition of P. Mil. Copto
- Doctoral advisor: Rodolphe Kasser

Academic work
- Discipline: archaeology
- Sub-discipline: Egyptology; Coptology
- Institutions: University of Geneva; École du Louvre; Catholic University of Paris
- Main interests: Coptic language

Nathalie Bosson is a Swiss Egyptologist, Coptologist, and archaeologist, born in 1963.

A teacher at the University of Geneva, the École du Louvre, and the Catholic University of Paris, she is generally regarded as one of the most prominent living experts studying the Coptic language.

== Biography ==
She was born in 1963.

After completing her gymnasium studies in 1982 in Geneva, she pursued studies in Egyptology, Coptic, English, Hebrew, and patristics at the University of Geneva, concluding in 1988. She defended her doctoral thesis ("The 'Milanese' variety of the Middle Egyptian Coptic dialect: Dialectal analysis accompanied by the complete re-edition of P. Mil. Copto") in 2002 under the supervision of Rodolphe Kasser. This dialect later remained one of her research subjects.

Between 1987 and 1989, she became involved with the French Institute of Oriental Archaeology and participated in archaeological campaigns in the Kellia as an epigrapher. She continued her research on the site as part of the Swiss Coptic Archaeology Mission from 1991, gathering numerous documents. Gradually, she took on a teaching role, initially at the École du Louvre, then at the Catholic University of Paris, and finally at the University of Geneva. from 2011 onwards. Bosson was also the first researcher to translate a complete work of Evagrius Ponticus into French.

Between 1995 and 2005, the researcher served as vice-president of the Francophone Association of Coptology before becoming its president. In her research, she delved into Christian texts, Gnostic texts, and Coptic magical papyri. Additionally, Bosson dedicated herself to Coptic linguistics and methods of transmission. For instance, in 2003, she created a Coptic font for computer use.

With her colleague, Anne Boud'hors, she undertook a coordination effort in Coptic studies and edited the Eighth International Congress of Coptic Studies proceedings in 2004. This work continued with other new editions of congresses, such as the fourteenth in 2016. She also collaborated with Rodolphe Kasser, who praised her appointment as a teacher at the University of Geneva, and with Sydney Aufrère, her husband and close collaborator, as they engaged in writing several works together. She also embarked on editorial projects and, after the death of Rodolphe Kasser, took charge of publishing the as-yet-unpublished Coptic manuscripts.

== Legacy ==
She is regarded as one of the most prominent living experts in the Coptic language.
