= Gospel of Judas =

2nd-century Gnostic gospel

The Gospel of Judas is a Gnostic religious text that consists of conversations between Jesus and his disciples, especially Judas Iscariot. The only copy of it known to exist is a Coptic language text that is part of the Codex Tchacos, which has been radiocarbon dated to 220–340 CE. Like the Gnostic texts of the Nag Hammadi library, this version is believed by most biblical scholars to be a translation of an original which was composed by an anonymous author in the Greek language by Gnostic Christians in the 2nd century.

Rejected as heresy by the early Christian church and lost for 1700 years, the document was rediscovered in Egypt in the 1970s. Decades of neglect and poor storage led to the degradation of much of the manuscript, leading to the loss of a few portions of the text. After undergoing extensive restoration and preservation, an English translation of the surviving text was first published in early 2006 by the National Geographic Society.

== History ==
The crux ansata (Coptic ankh) is displayed on the final page of the Codex Tchacos

=== Authorship ===
Like the four canonical gospels, the Gospel of Judas is anonymous.

=== Date ===
In early January 2005, researchers at the Arizona Accelerator Mass Spectrometry Laboratory of the University of Arizona completed their radiocarbon dating testing of four samples of papyrus from the codex and one sample of leather from the binding. The mean calendar age for these samples was between 220–340 CE.

In January 2006, ink samples from the codex were examined in another laboratory using polarized light microscopy, infrared spectroscopy, Raman spectroscopy, scanning electron microscopy, transmission electron microscopy, and x-ray diffraction. The chemical composition of the ink was determined not to match that of any modern ink, and its chemical composition was consistent with what would be expected for a document produced in Egypt during the third century AD.

It is likely, based on textual analysis of the dialect used and the presence of certain Greek loanwords, that the Coptic text contained in the codex is a translation from an older Greek manuscript dating to sometime before 180 AD. Cited in support of this dating is the reference to a "Gospel of Judas" in the work Adversus Haereses. This work was written around 180 AD by the early Christian writer Irenaeus, who described the Gospel of Judas as "fictitious history". However, it is uncertain whether the text mentioned by Irenaeus is the same work as that found in the Codex Tchacos.

=== Rediscovery ===
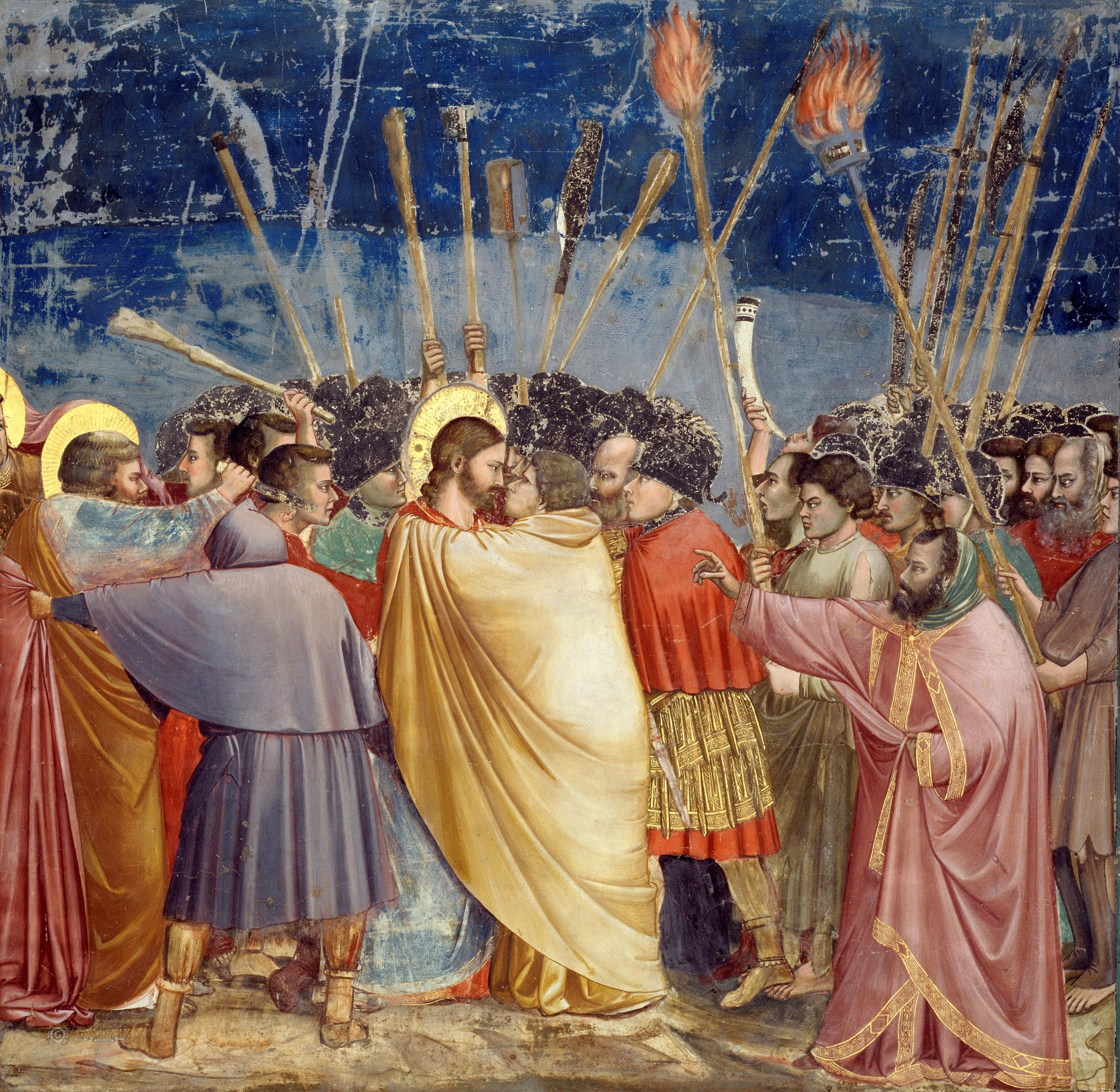
"The Kiss of Judas" is a traditional depiction of Judas by Giotto di Bondone, c. 1306. Fresco in the Scrovegni Chapel, Padua.

Sometime in the 1970s, an Egyptian farmer discovered a limestone box in an ancient tomb. The tomb was located on the east bank of the Nile River, in a village near Maghagha, Egypt. Inside the box was a leather-bound papyrus codex, written in the Sahidic dialect of the Coptic language. The farmer sold the document in 1978 to an antiquities dealer in Cairo who went by the pseudonym "Hanna Asabil". The document was stolen from Hanna's apartment and smuggled into Geneva in 1980; Hanna subsequently recovered it in 1982.

Stephen Emmel was perhaps the first scholar to inspect the codex when it appeared among a group of ancient manuscripts on the antiquities "grey market" in Geneva in May 1983. At that time, the document consisted of some 30 leaves (60 pages), which were damaged but "still in pretty good condition". From 1984 until 2000, Hanna transported the codex in a cardboard box back and forth between Europe and the United States, but was unable to find a buyer prepared to purchase a manuscript with such questionable provenance. During this period, the fragile codex was folded in half and often handled roughly. It was stored mainly in a narrow safe deposit box in Hicksville, New York, where it was subjected to a humid and unstable climate.

By 1999, the manuscript was in very bad condition: its bindings had disintegrated, its pages had been reshuffled and had disintegrated into over a thousand pieces, and numerous sections were missing. Some passages were only scattered words, while others contained many lines. According to archaeologist and Coptic scholar Rodolphe Kasser, the codex originally contained 31 leaves, each written on both sides. By the time the codex came to the market in 1999, only 13 leaves survived. Individual leaves may have been removed and sold.

Antiquities dealer Frieda Nussberger-Tchacos purchased the codex in April 2000 and named it Codex Tchacos in honor of her father, Dimaratos Tchacos. She deposited the manuscript at Yale University's Beinecke Rare Book & Manuscript Library, where it was examined by experts. Because of its dubious origins (especially the possibility that it had been removed illegally from Egypt), Yale declined to purchase the codex. In September 2000, she sold the codex to Bruce Ferrini, who inexplicably decided to store the codex in a freezer. This dramatically accelerated the degradation of the codex, causing the ink and sap to separate from the fibers of the papyrus, darkening its leaves and making the leaves far more fragile than they already were. Concerned with its rapidly deteriorating condition, Tchacos managed to reacquire most of the codex from Ferrini. In February 2001, she transferred it to the Maecenas Foundation in Basel to oversee its restoration, preservation, translation, and publication.

=== Restoration and publication ===
The existence of the text was made public in July 2004 by Rodolphe Kasser at the International Congress of Coptic Studies in Paris. In a statement issued 30 March 2005, a spokesman for the Maecenas Foundation announced plans for translations into English, French, German, and Polish once the fragile papyrus had undergone conservation by a team of Coptologists to be led by Kasser, and that their work would be published the following year.

Kasser revealed a few details about the text in 2004, as reported by the Dutch paper Het Parool. Its language is the same Sahidic dialect of Coptic in which Coptic texts of the Nag Hammadi library are written. The codex has four parts:

- The Letter of Peter to Philip, already known from the Nag Hammadi library
- The First Apocalypse of James, also known from the Nag Hammadi library
- The first few pages of a work related to, but not the same as, the Nag Hammadi work Allogenes
- The Gospel of Judas

On 6 April 2006, the National Geographic Society announced the completion of the restoration of the codex at a news conference in Washington, D.C. The published manuscript of the first translation of the Gospel of Judas from Coptic to English was unveiled on that day at the National Geographic Society Headquarters. A two-hour documentary entitled The Gospel of Judas – which was aired on the National Geographic Channel – followed on 9 April 2006.

In 2007, the National Geographic Society published the "Critical Edition" of the manuscript, which includes images of all the fragments, the reconstructed Coptic text, and English and French translations.

The initial translation of the Gospel of Judas was widely publicized but simply confirmed the account that was written in Irenaeus and known Gnostic beliefs, leading some scholars to simply summarize the discovery as nothing new. It is also argued that a closer reading of the existing text, as presented in October 2006, shows Christianity in a new light. According to Elaine Pagels, for instance, Judas is portrayed as having a mission to hand Jesus over to the soldiers. She says that Bible translators have mistranslated the Greek word for "handing over" to "betrayal".

=== Missing pieces ===
For some 17 centuries, the Gospel of Judas was considered to be a lost literary work. As of 2025, only one manuscript of the Gospel of Judas has been identified, contained within the aforementioned Codex Tchacos. This manuscript contains many lacunae, some of which are quite lengthy. Up to a third of the Codex Tchacos is currently illegible, and other pages may yet be loose on the antiquities market.

Parts of the codex turned up in January 2006 in New York City. On 19 April 2006, Ferrini's court-appointed lawyer stated that he possessed several fragments from the codex, but he refused to have the fragments authenticated. Photographs of these fragments were later made available to Marvin Meyer and Gregor Wurst, who presented their preliminary translation at Society of Biblical Literature Annual Meeting in New Orleans in November 2009.

== Content ==
The Gospel of Judas consists of 17 chapters, as follows:

1. Introduction (Incipit): The author tells the reader that this treatise describes the private revelation that Jesus imparted to Judas in the week leading up to Jesus' arrest and crucifixion.
2. The earthly ministry of Jesus: Jesus laughs when he sees his disciples gathered in observance of the Eucharist. He tells them, "<You> are not doing this because of your own will but because it is through this that your god [will be] praised." Then he tells them, "How do you know me? Truly [I] say to you, no generation of the people that are among you will know me."
3. The disciples become angry: Judas Iscariot, the only disciple who is able to stand in front of Jesus, says to Jesus, "I know who you are and where you have come from. You are from the immortal realm of Barbelo. And I am not worthy to utter the name of the one who has sent you."
4. Jesus speaks to Judas privately: Jesus tells Judas, "Step away from the others and I shall tell you the mysteries of the kingdom. It is possible for you to reach it, but you will grieve a great deal. ... For someone else will replace you, in order that the twelve [disciples] may again come to completion with their god."
5. The disciples see the temple and discuss it: The disciples tell Jesus about their vision of the Great Temple in Jerusalem.
6. Jesus offers an allegorical interpretation of the vision of the temple: Jesus tells the disciples, "Those you have seen receiving the offerings at the altar—that is who you are. ...The cattle you have seen brought for sacrifice are the many people you lead astray."
7. Judas asks Jesus about that generation and human generations: Jesus tells the disciples, "The souls of every human generation will die. When these people, however, have completed the time of the kingdom and the spirit leaves them, their bodies will die but their souls will be alive, and they will be taken up."
8. Judas asks about his own fate: Jesus tells Judas, "You will become the thirteenth, and you will be cursed by the other generations—and you will come to rule over them."
9. Jesus teaches Judas about cosmology (the spirit and the self-generated): The author writes that God is essentially a "luminous cloud" of light that exists in an imperishable and infinite realm.
10. Adamas and the luminaries: Adamas, the spiritual father of all humanity, was created in God's image and dwelt in the imperishable realm.
11. The cosmos, chaos, and the underworld: At the beginning of time, God willed a group of angels and lower gods into existence to be his assistants and to rule over chaos and the underworld. First came El, then Nebro (aka Yaldabaoth) and Saklas, then others.
12. The rulers and angels: The five angels who ruled over the underworld and over chaos were Seth, Harmathoth, Galila, Yobel, and Adonaios.
13. The creation of humanity: Saklas (the inferior god) and his angels created physical bodies in God's image for Adam and Eve.
14. Judas asks about the destiny of Adam and humanity: Judas asks Jesus, "Does the human spirit die?" Jesus replies, "This is why God ordered Michael to give the spirits of people to them as a loan, so that they might offer service, but the Great One ordered Gabriel to grant spirits to the great generation with no ruler over it—that is, the spirit and the soul."
15. Jesus discusses the destruction of the wicked with Judas and others: Jesus tells Judas, "I am not laughing [at you] but at the error of the stars, because these six stars wander about with these five combatants, and they all will be destroyed along with their creatures."
16. Jesus speaks of those who are baptized, and Judas' betrayal: Jesus tells Judas that he will exceed all of the other disciples, "For you will sacrifice the man that clothes me." He then tells Judas to "Lift up your eyes and look at the cloud and the light within it and the stars surrounding it. The star that leads the way is your star." Judas looks up, sees the luminous cloud of the infinite realm, and ascends into it.
17. Conclusion: Judas betrays Jesus: The chief priests wanted to arrest Jesus on charges of being a false prophet. They gave Judas some money and he handed Jesus over to them.

The text also makes references to other aeons, such as Sophia.

== Significance ==
Like many Gnostic works, the Gospel of Judas refers to itself as a secret account, specifically "The secret account of the revelation that Jesus spoke in conversation with Judas Iscariot...." It is a polemical work that contains ideas that contradict those of early proto-orthodox heresiologists such as Irenaeus and Tertullian, as well as some of the Apostolic Fathers such as Ignatius of Antioch and Polycarp. The treatise is of significance because it presents a very different version of Judas Iscariot than that of the four canonical gospels of the New Testament. While the canonical gospels portray Judas as a sinister betrayer who delivered Jesus to the Roman authorities for crucifixion in exchange for money, the Gospel of Judas portrays Judas as Jesus' confidant, chosen to be told spiritual secrets that the other apostles were not, and whose actions were done in obedience to instructions given to him by Jesus. The Gospel of Judas asserts that the other disciples had not learned the true euangélion, which Jesus taught only to Judas — the sole follower belonging to (or set apart from) the "holy generation" among the disciples.

The Gospel of Judas is notable because it contains a gnostic reworking of the creation narratives found in the first two chapters of the Book of Genesis. According to the text, we inhabit an imperfect and corruptible physical world which was created by an inferior deity, and the only way for us to achieve salvation is to gain access to special knowledge, which is revealed only to an elite few favored by the supreme deity.

The author writes that eleven of the disciples whom Jesus chose to spread his message were obsessed with the physical world of the senses, and misunderstood the central tenets of his teaching. They continued to practice religious animal sacrifice, which pleased the lower gods but did not help to foster a connection with the true God. They taught that those martyred in the name of Christ would be bodily resurrected.

In contrast, Jesus is able to teach Judas the true meaning of his life, ministry and death. Mankind can be divided into two races, or groups. Those who are furnished with the immortal soul, like Judas, can come to know the God within and enter the imperishable realm when they die. Those among the same group as the other eleven disciples cannot enter the realm of God and will die both spiritually and physically at the end of their lives. As practices that are intertwined with the physical world, animal sacrifice and a communion ceremony involving "cannibalism" (the consumption of Jesus' flesh and blood) are condemned as abhorrent.

Unlike the four canonical gospels, which employ narrative accounts of the last year of Jesus' life and of his birth (in the case of Luke and Matthew), the Judas gospel takes the form of dialogues between Jesus and Judas, and Jesus and the twelve disciples, without being embedded in any narrative. Such "dialogue gospels" were popular during the early decades of Christianity and the New Testament apocrypha contains several examples, such as the Gospel of Mary.

Like the canonical gospels, the Gospel of Judas portrays the scribes as approaching Jesus with the intention of arresting him, and Judas receiving money from them after handing Jesus over to them. However, unlike Judas in the canonical gospels, who is portrayed as a villain, and excoriated by Jesus ("Alas for that man by whom the Son of Man is betrayed. It would be better for that man if he had never been born," Mark 14:21; Matthew 26:24), the Judas gospel portrays Judas as a divinely appointed instrument of a grand and predetermined purpose. "In the last days they will curse your ascent to the holy (generation)."

Elsewhere in the manuscript, Jesus favours Judas above other disciples by saying, "Step away from the others and I shall tell you the mysteries of the kingdom," and "Look, you have been told everything. Lift up your eyes and look at the cloud and the light within it and the stars surrounding it. The star that leads the way is your star."

== Responses and reactions ==
=== Views on importance ===
Scholars are divided on the interpretation of the text. In particular, there is no consensus on how Judas is characterized in this gospel. The first modern publication of the gospel contended that the text portrays Judas in a positive light, while other scholars have asserted that Judas is presented negatively.

=== Significance ===
Historians Elaine Pagels and Karen Leigh King argue that a more nuanced, contextualized understanding of alternative interpretations of the Christian tradition should inform discussions of Gnosticism. In the centuries following Jesus' death, many differing views of the meaning of his life and death existed. Proto-orthodox Christianity (i.e. the views which came to be dominant in the fourth century AD, similar to the doctrines contained in the Nicene Creed) existed alongside various beliefs (one of which was labelled 'Gnosticism') for centuries, until proto-orthodox interpretations became accepted as "mainstream" Christianity.

Terry Garcia, an executive vice president for Mission Programs of the National Geographic Society, asserted that the codex is considered by scholars and scientists to be the most significant ancient, non-biblical text to be found since the 1940s.

=== Mixed importance ===
Amy-Jill Levine, professor of New Testament Studies at Vanderbilt University Divinity School, was on the team of scholars responsible for unveiling the work. She said that the Gospel of Judas contains no new historical information concerning Jesus or Judas.

James M. Robinson, general editor of the Nag Hammadi library, predicted the new book would offer no historical insights into the disciple who betrayed Jesus. Since the third-century document originates from an earlier 2nd-century document, Robinson suggested that the text would provide insights into the religious situation during the 2nd century, rather than into the historical events portrayed in the canonical gospels.

=== Historical interpretations ===
One scholar on the National Geographic project, professor Craig A. Evans, stated his belief that the document showed that Judas was "fooled" into believing he was helping Jesus. Another scholar, April DeConick, a professor of Biblical studies at Rice University, opined in an op-ed in The New York Times that the National Geographic translation was critically faulty in many substantial respects, and that based on a corrected translation, Judas was actually a demon, truly betraying Jesus, rather than following his orders. DeConick, after re-translating the text, published The Thirteenth Apostle: What the Gospel of Judas Really Says to assert that Judas was not a daimon in the Greek sense, but that "the universally accepted word for 'spirit' is 'pneuma' – in Gnostic literature 'daimon' is always taken to mean 'demon'". She further stated that "Judas is not set apart 'for' the holy generation, as the National Geographic translation says, he is separated 'from' it." DeConick went on to ask, "Were they genuine errors or was something more deliberate going on?" The National Geographic Society responded that "virtually all issues April D. DeConick raises about translation choices are addressed in footnotes in both the popular and critical editions."

André Gagné, professor at Concordia University in Montreal, also questioned how the experts of the National Geographic Society understood the role of Judas Iscariot in the Gospel of Judas. His argument rests on the translation of the Greco-Coptic term apophasis as "denial". According to Gagné, the opening lines of the Judas Gospel should not be translated as "the secret word of declaration by which Jesus spoke in conversation with Judas Iscariot" but rather as "the secret word of the denial by which Jesus spoke in conversation with Judas Iscariot" (Gospel of Judas 33:1). Gagné's conclusion is that this gospel is the story of the denial of true salvation for Judas.

In 2006 Géza Vermes commented the gospel was "a typical product of Greek (Platonic)-Christian speculation" representing Judas "assisting the Jewish authorities' arrest of Jesus and bringing about his liberation from the prison of his body". This view is exemplified by a passage where Jesus says to Judas, "For you will sacrifice the man that clothes me."

=== Religious reactions ===
In his 2006 Easter address, Rowan Williams, then Archbishop of Canterbury, strongly denied the historical credibility of the gospel, saying: "This is a demonstrably late text which simply parallels a large number of quite well-known works from the more eccentric fringes of the early century Church." He went on to suggest that the book's publicity derived from a desire for conspiracy theories.

=== Wider culture ===
A CNN TV series entitled "Finding Jesus – Faith, Fact, Forgery" featured The Gospel of Judas in its 3rd episode, which was aired on March 15, 2015.

== Uniqueness of the codex ==
The president of the Maecenas Foundation, Mario Roberty, suggested that the Maecenas Foundation had acquired the only known copy of the Gospel, but not necessarily the only extant copy. Roberty went on to speculate that the Vatican Library probably had another copy locked away, saying:

In those days the Church decided for political reasons to include the Gospels of Matthew, Mark, Luke, and John in the Bible. The other gospels were banned. It is highly logical that the Catholic Church would have kept a copy of the forbidden gospels. Sadly, the Vatican does not want to clarify further. Their policy has been the same for years; "no further comment".

Roberty provided no evidence to suggest that the Vatican does, in fact, possess any additional copy. While the contents of one part of the Vatican library have been catalogued and have long been available to researchers and scholars, the remainder of the library is without a public catalogue, and though researchers may view any work within, they must first name the text they require, a serious problem for those who do not know what is contained by the library. The Pope responded on 13 April 2006:

The Vatican, by word of Pope Benedict XVI, grants the recently surfaced Judas' Gospel no credit with regards to its apocryphal claims that Judas betrayed Jesus in compliance with the latter's own requests. According to the Pope, Judas freely chose to betray Jesus: "an open rejection of God's love." Judas, according to Pope Benedict XVI "viewed Jesus in terms of power and success: his only real interests lay in his power and success, there was no love involved. He was a greedy man: money was more important than communing with Jesus; money came before God and his love." According to the Pope it was these traits that led Judas to "turn liar, two-faced, indifferent to the truth", "losing any sense of God", "turning hard, incapable of converting, of being the prodigal son, hence throwing away a spent existence".

Spokespersons say the Vatican does not wish to suppress the Gospel of Judas; rather, according to Monsignor Walter Brandmüller, president of the Vatican's Committee for Historical Science, "We welcome the [manuscript] like we welcome the critical study of any text of ancient literature."

Even more explicitly, Father Thomas D. Williams, Dean of Theology at the Regina Apostolorum university in Rome, when asked, "Is it true that the Catholic Church has tried to cover up this text and other apocryphal texts?" answered, "These are myths circulated by Dan Brown and numerous conspiracy theorists. You can go to any Catholic bookstore and pick up a copy of the Gnostic gospels. Christians may not believe them to be true, but there is no attempt to hide them."

== See also ==
- Antilegomena – Biblical books whose authenticity or value is disputed
- Cainites – Heresy described by Irenaeus to descredit Gnostic movements
- Denial of Peter – Episode from the Passion of Christ
- Development of the New Testament canon
- Emanationism – Belief that all things derive from a first reality
- Epigraphy – Study of inscriptions
- Sethianism – Gnostic religion of the 2nd and 3rd centuries
