= Anne Boud'hors =

French Egyptologist, Coptologist and philologist

- Born: 28 October 1958 (age 67)
- Awards: Ordre national du mérite

Academic background
- Education: École normale supérieure

Academic work
- Discipline: Egyptology; Coptology
- Institutions: French National Centre for Scientific Research
- Main interests: Coptic biblical translations

Anne Boud'hors (born 28 October 1958) is a French Egyptologist, Coptologist, and philologist. A research director at CNRS, she is a specialist in Coptic biblical translations, particularly the Gospel of John.

== Biography ==
Boud'hors was born on 28 October 1958. Anne Boud'hors studied classics at the École normale supérieure and obtained her grammar agrégation after completing a doctorate. She attended the Greek philology classes of Jean Irigoin, where she encountered a young Philippe Hoffmann.

As a research director at CNRS, she dedicated herself to the study of the Coptic language and civilization. In collaboration with Éléonore Cellard, François Déroche, and Catherine Louis, she explored Coptic texts related to the birth of Islam. Among other topics, she specialized in the figure of Timothy II. The researcher edits and translates certain texts from the Louvre collections. She was involved, notably, with a Parisian antiquarian to facilitate the publication of a manuscript, and her negotiations lead to the successful publication of the text.

Together with her colleague Nathalie Bosson, she undertook the coordination of Coptic studies and, in 2004, publishes the Proceedings of the Eighth International Congress of Coptic Studies. This effort continued with other new editions of congresses, such as the fourteenth in 2016. Boud'hors is one of the world specialists in Coptic biblical translations, particularly the Gospel of John.

In November 2019, she was appointed a knight of the Ordre national du mérite.

== Decorations ==
- Knight of the Ordre national du mérite
