= Oral transmission =

Oral transmission, literally meaning "passing by mouth", may refer to:

- Oral tradition of stories, texts, music, laws and other cultural elements
  - Oral gospel traditions, referring specifically to the Christian Gospels
- Pathogen transmission in medicine and biology
