= Magical papyri =

Magical papyri may refer to:

- Coptic magical papyri
- Greek magical papyri
- Jewish magical papyri
