= Old Coptic =

Earliest stage of Coptic

A Old Coptic magical text on papyrus from the 2nd century AD, written using both Greek and Demotic characters

Old Coptic is the earliest stage of Coptic writing, a form of late Egyptian written in the Coptic script, a variant of the Greek alphabet. It "is an analytical category … utilised by scholars to refer to a particular group of sources" and not a language, dialect or singular writing system. Scholars differ on the exact boundaries of the Old Coptic corpus and thus on the definition of "Old Coptic". Generally, it can be said that Old Coptic texts use more letters of Demotic derivation than later literary Coptic. They lack the consistent script style and borrowed Greek vocabulary of later Coptic literature. Some even use exclusively Greek letters. Moreover, they are generally or exclusively of Egyptian pagan origin, as opposed to later literary Coptic texts, which are strongly associated with Coptic Christianity and to a lesser extent Gnosticism and Manichaeism.

The earliest surviving examples of Egyptian words transliterated in Greek script date to the 6th century BC. Whole Egyptian phrases appear in Greek script from the 3rd century BC. The earliest Coptic text known is from the 1st century AD. The earliest stage of experimentation with the Egyptian language in the Greek alphabet is sometimes called Pre-Old Coptic or Graeco-Egyptian. Other authors distinguish between early and late Old Coptic. The production of pagan magical texts written in Egyptian in Greek letters continued into the 4th or 5th century, after the start of Coptic literature proper.

== Bibliography ==
- Fournet, Jean-Luc (2020). The Rise of Coptic: Egyptian versus Greek in Late Antiquity. Princeton University Press.
- Griffith, Francis Llewellyn (1900). "The Old Coptic Magical Texts of Paris". Zeitschrift für ägyptische Sprache und Altertumskunde. 38 (1): 85–93. doi:10.1524/zaes.1900.38.jg.85. S2CID 193725455.
- Griffith, Francis Llewellyn (1901). "The Date of the Old Coptic Texts and their Relation to Christian Coptic". Zeitschrift für ägyptische Sprache und Altertumskunde. 39 (1): 78–82. doi:10.1524/zaes.1901.39.jg.78. S2CID 193639512.
- Kasser, Rodolphe (1991). "Alphabets, Old Coptic". In Aziz Suryal Atiya (ed.). The Coptic Encyclopedia. Vol. 8. New York: Macmillan Publishers. cols. 41a–45b.
- Love, Edward O. D. (2016). Code-switching with the Gods: The Bilingual (Old Coptic-Greek) Spells of PGM IV (P. Bibliothèque Nationale Supplément Grec. 574) and their Linguistic, Religious, and Socio-Cultural Context in Late Roman Egypt. De Gruyter. doi:10.1515/9783110467833. ISBN 9783110467833.
- Love, Edward O. D. (2021). "The Nature of Old Coptic I". Journal of Coptic Studies. 23: 91–143. doi:10.2143/JCS.23.0.3289390.
- Love, Edward O. D. (2022a). "The Nature of Old Coptic II". Journal of Coptic Studies. 24: 243–281. doi:10.2143/JCS.24.0.3290758.
- Love, Edward O. D. (2022b). Script Switching in Roman Egypt: Case Studies in Script Conventions, Domains, Shift, and Obsolescence from Hieroglyphic, Hieratic, Demotic, and Old Coptic Manuscripts. De Gruyter. doi:10.1515/9783110768435. ISBN 9783110768435. S2CID 245110259.
- Love, Edward O. D. (2023). "The Nature of Old Coptic III: Old Coptic at Akoris (§ 9)". Journal of Coptic Studies. 25: 157–181.
- Orlandi, Tito (1986). "Coptic Literature". In Birger A. Pearson; James E. Goehring (eds.). The Roots of Egyptian Christianity. Fortress Press. pp. 51–81. ISBN 9780800631000.
- Quack, Joachim Friedrich (2017). "How the Coptic Script Came About" (PDF). In Eitan Grossman; Peter Dils; Tonio Sebastian Richter; Wolfgang Schenkel (eds.). Greek Influence on Egyptian-Coptic: Contact-Induced Change in an Ancient African Language. Hamburg. pp. 27–96.
- Quaegebeur, Jan (1991a). "Pre-Coptic". In Aziz Suryal Atiya (ed.). The Coptic Encyclopedia. Vol. 8. New York: Macmillan Publishers. cols. 188b–190a.
- Quaegebeur, Jan (1991b). "Pre-Old Coptic". In Aziz Suryal Atiya (ed.). The Coptic Encyclopedia. Vol. 8. New York: Macmillan Publishers. cols. 190a–191b.
- Satzinger, Helmut (1975). "The Old Coptic Schmidt Papyrus". Journal of the American Research Center in Egypt. 12: 37–50. doi:10.2307/40000008. JSTOR 3855282.
- Satzinger, Helmut (1991). "Old Coptic". In Aziz Suryal Atiya (ed.). The Coptic Encyclopedia. Vol. 8. New York: Macmillan Publishers. cols. 169b–175b.
- Sederholm, Val (2006). Papyrus British Museum 10808 and its Cultural and Religious Setting. Brill. doi:10.1163/9789047407355. ISBN 9789047407355.
- Wilfong, Terry G. (2001). "Coptic Literature". In Donald B. Redford (ed.). The Oxford Encyclopedia of Ancient Egypt. Oxford University Press. ISBN 978-0-19-510234-5.
