= Bosson (surname) =

Bosson is a surname. Notable people with the surname include:

- Albert D. Bosson (1853–1926), American jurist, attorney, and politician
- André Louis Bosson (1894–1918), French World War I flying ace
- Barbara Bosson (1939–2023), American actress and writer
- Bernard Bosson (1948–2017), French politician and lawyer
- Nathalie Bosson (born 1963), Swiss Egyptologist, Coptologist, and archaeologist
- Opie Bosson (born 1980), New Zealand jockey
- Richard C. Bosson (born 1944), American jurist from New Mexico
- Terence Bosson, English wrestler
