= Ashmolean Parchment AN 1981.940 =

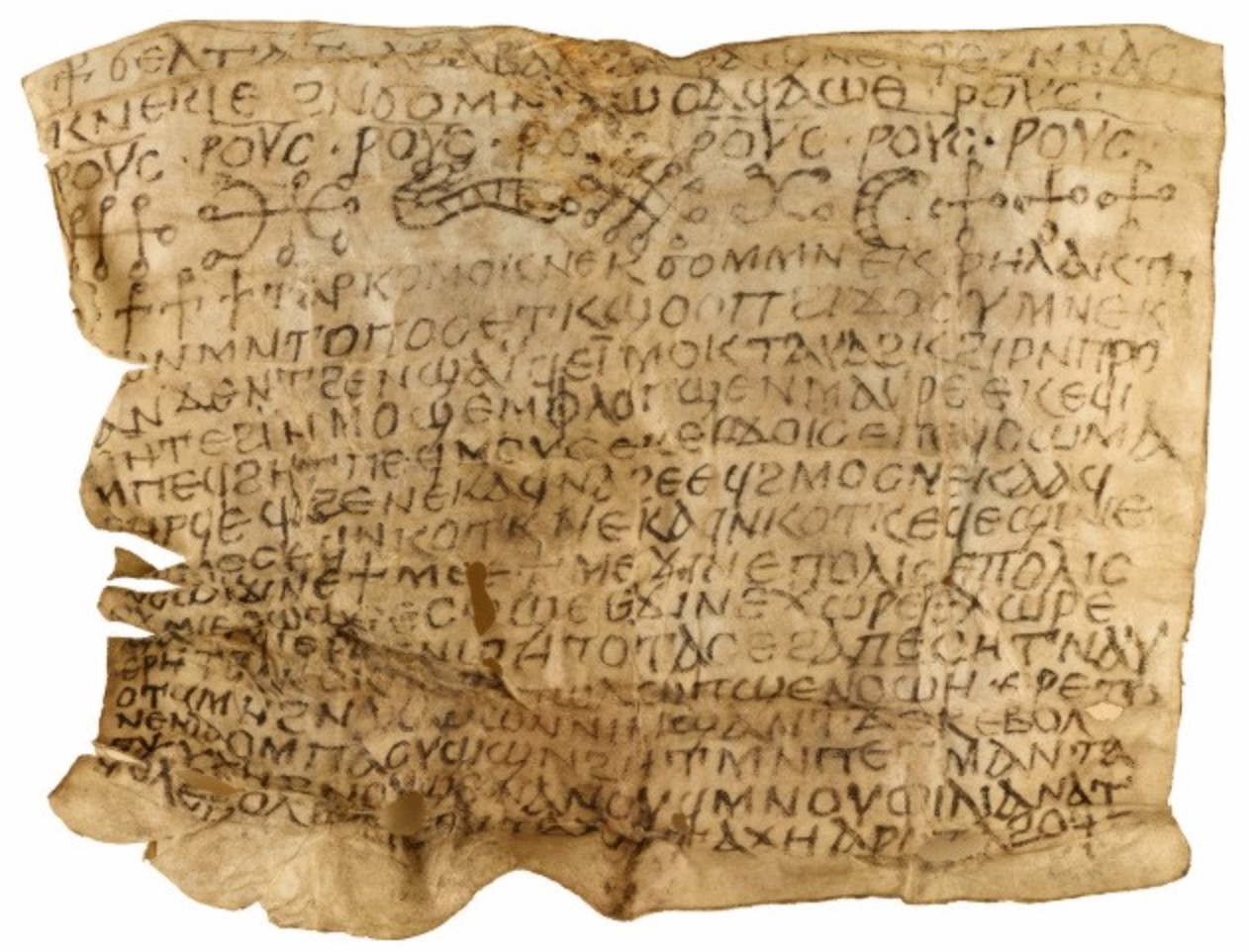
- Created: 6th or 7th century
- Location: Ashmolean Museum, Oxford, England
- Author: Apapolo
- Media type: Vellum
- Subject: Love spell
- Purpose: Conjuring romantic love and sexual passion

The manuscript designated Ashmolean Parchment AN 1981.940 contains a love spell in Coptic (written in a Hermopolitan dialect) regarding male homosexuality. It is held and preserved at the Ashmolean Museum in Oxford, England.

== Description ==
This vellum leaf was obtained by the British Egyptologist Francis Llewellyn Griffith from an Egyptian avocat named Fanous. It dates back to 6th or 7th century, and measures 10.5 cm wide and 8 cm high. The creases in the manuscript show that it was originally folded to 2.5 × 1.3 cm. Its provenance is unknown, but the dialect suggests somewhere in middle Egypt, perhaps Hermopolis and its surrounding areas.

The text is an incantation by a man named Apapolo (Papapōlō), the son of Nooe (Noah), to compel the love of another man Phello (Phlo), the son of Maure. Phello will be restless until he finds Apapolo and satisfies the latter's desire. The text provides the only example in Coptic language of a love spell between men.

The English translation from the Kyprianos Database of Ancient Ritual Texts and Objects of the University of Würzburg:

[magical words: Celtatalbabal. Karašneife Nnas Kneife, by the power of Iao Sabaoth! Rous Rous Rous Rous Rous Rous Rous Rous]
I adjure you by your powers and your phylacteries and the places upon which you dwell and your names that in the way that I will take you and place you at the door and the path of Phlo the son of Maure, you will take his heart, his mind (?), you will master his whole body! If he stands you will not let him stand, if he sits you will not let him sit, if he sleeps you will not let him sleep! He will seek after me from village to village, from city to city, from field to field, from land to land, until he comes to me and he subjects himself beneath my feet – me, Apapolo, the son of Nooe – his hands filled with all good things, until I fulfil with him the desire of my heart and the request of my soul in a good desire and an unbreakable affection, now, now, quickly, quickly, do my work!

== See also ==
- Coptic magical papyri
- Homosexuality in ancient Egypt
