= Maecenas Foundation =

Swiss foundation

The Maecenas Foundation is a Swiss foundation whose sole officer is Mario Roberty, a Swiss attorney. Centered in the city of Basel, it came to notice in 2005 when Swiss art dealer Frieda Nussberger-Tchacos, the owner of the Codex Tchacos, which contains the Gospel of Judas, informed the press that the manuscript would be donated to Maecenas for conservation and publication. The foundation reached a commercial agreement with National Geographic, and sold the copyright of the Coptic text to the magazine. Roberty was previously best known as Nussberger-Tchacos' lawyer.

The creation of a foundation to contain the Gospel of Judas was proposed earlier on by the various people who owned it between 2000–2005. Papers online at Michel van Rijn's site indicate that such shell foundations were part of the process of marketing the text by the art dealers.
