= Rodolphe Kasser =

Swiss coptologist (1927–2013)

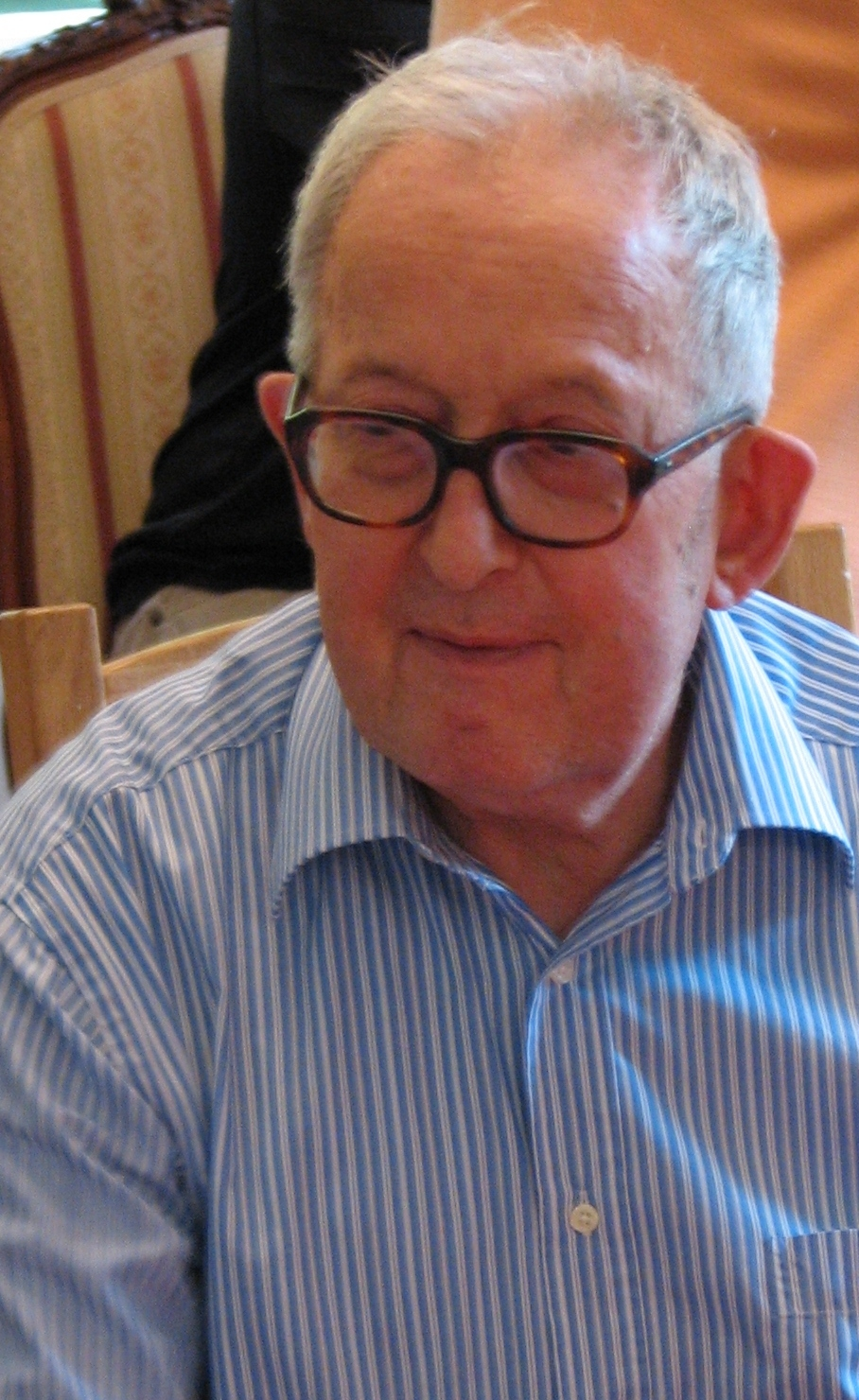
Rodolphe Kasser 2007

Rodolphe Kasser (14 January 1927 – 8 October 2013), was a Swiss philologist, archaeologist, and a Coptic scholar. He specialized in ancient Coptic language manuscripts, notably including the Codex Tchacos which includes the Gospel of Judas. He worked as both a professor at the University of Geneva and as head of the archaeological excavations of the Swiss Mission of Coptic Archaeology.

== Biography ==
Born in Yverdon-les-Bains, Switzerland, Kasser obtained his higher education in theology in Lausanne and in Paris from 1946 to 1950 and a diploma from the École Pratique des Hautes Études (Ph.D. equivalent) in Paris in 1964. He conducted pastoral ministry in Switzerland and in France from 1953 to 1959.

From 1963 to 1998, he was on the staff at the Faculty of Arts of the University of Geneva, lecturing in Coptic languages and literature. First as professor extraordinary from 1963 to 1976, then as professor from 1976 to 1998. After 1965, he was the head of the archaeological excavations of the Swiss Mission of Coptic Archaeology in the Kellia, Lower Egypt.

After 1962, Kasser did important research in the field of Coptic philology, including the preparation of a new Coptic dictionary. This work was done in parallel with reforms in Coptic dialectal classification. He published several important Greek and Coptic codices of the Bodmeriana Library, most of them biblical.

After 2000, Kasser organized the restoration and prepared the edition princeps of Codex Tchacos, containing the Gospel of Judas and three other Coptic gnostic texts.

== Selected publications ==
- Kasser, Rodolphe; Meyer, Marvin W.; Wurst, Gregor (2006). The Gospel of Judas. In collaboration with François Gaudard. National Geographic. ISBN 9781426201912.
  - Kasser, Rodolphe; Meyer, Marvin W.; Wurst, Gregor (2008). The Gospel of Judas. In collaboration with François Gaudard (Second ed.). National Geographic. ISBN 9781426200489.
- Kasser, Rodolphe; Wurst, Gregor (2007). The Gospel of Judas: Together with the Letter of Peter to Philip, James, and a Book of Allogenes from Codex Tchacos: Critical edition. National Geographic. ISBN 9781426201912.

Kasser and his coauthors' work on Codex Tchacos was published in 2006, including an English translation of the Gospel of Judas and four articles of commentary, one from each translator and another from Bart Ehrman. A critical edition featuring full-color photographs was published in 2007, and a second edition in 2008. The National Geographic Channel also aired a full documentary in 2006 called The Gospel of Judas, with an 87 minute runtime (equivalent to 2 hours if commercials are included). The papyrus manuscript went on display at the National Geographic Society's museum in Washington DC, in April 2006.

The translation and commentary contends that the most vilified man in Christendom understood Jesus better than any of the other disciples. The disciple who betrayed Jesus was actually doing the bidding of Christ himself. This interpretation has been contested by other academics since the gospel's initial publication.
