= Kenneth E. Bailey =

American theologist and linguist (1930–2016)

Kenneth Bailey
- Born: November 24, 1930
- Died: May 23, 2016 (aged 85)
- Citizenship: American
- Education: Monmouth College (Illinois) B. A. 1952 Pittsburgh Theological Seminary M. Div. Concordia Theological Seminary Th. D.
- Occupations: Author, Professor, Linguist
- Writing career
- Subject: New Testament
- Movement: Oral Tradition

Kenneth E. Bailey (November 24, 1930 – May 23, 2016) was an American author, professor of theology, and linguist.

== Life ==
Bailey was born in Bloomington, Illinois. He graduated from Monmouth College in Illinois majoring in Philosophy in 1952. He married Ethel Jean Milligan, before attending Pittsburgh Theological Seminary in Pennsylvania. He was ordained by the Presbyterian Church (USA). He spent 40 years (1955–1995) teaching in Egypt, Lebanon, Israel and Cyprus. From 1970 until 1972 he studied for a Doctor of Theology degree from Concordia Theological Seminary in St. Louis, Missouri in Arabic and literature, systematic theology and wrote his dissertation in the field of New Testament. Since 1962 he taught for the Near East School of Theology in Beirut, Lebanon (since 1974 as professor for New Testament studies), where he founded the Institute for Middle Eastern New Testament Studies. From 1985 to 1995, he taught at the Ecumenical Institute for Theological Research in Jerusalem. He taught at Princeton University and was associate professor of theology in Dubuque Theological Seminary, McCormick Theological Seminary and Pittsburgh Theological Seminary as well as the Fuller Theological Seminary in Los Angeles.

In 1990, Bailey moved to Nicosia, Cyprus, and became Canon Theologian of the Anglican Episcopal Diocese of Cyprus and the Gulf. In June 1997, he became Canon Theologian of the Episcopal Diocese of Pittsburgh of the Episcopal Church (United States). Bailey resided in New Wilmington, Pennsylvania.

Bailey died on May 23, 2016, at the age of 85.

== Reception ==
Kenneth Bailey's works have made a tremendous impact on scholarship studying the oral traditions behind the New Testament on par with that of Werner Kelber, with titans of the field James Dunn and N. T. Wright using his work.

Theodore Weeden criticized Bailey by claiming that his evidence does not support his conclusions, finding that some of the stories Bailey and his Egyptian subjects narrated differed from Rena Hogg, missionary John Hogg's daughter. Eric Eve agrees that Bailey's work does not prove historicity but admits that tradition has social controls, that Bailey's Egyptian traditions are applicable to the Gospel traditions, and that Weeden was too harsh. Eve notes that an eyewitness to the robber story was the one who changed it to legend quickly before staying stable for decades. Eric Eve approves of James DG Dunn's usage of Bailey's work and views the conclusions he drew from it as sound, partially because he draws on various other scholars as well.

Dunn responded to Weeden's critique and defended Bailey, arguing that the former misunderstood Bailey as well as the way oral tradition works in general, arguing that Bailey's model explains the Synoptic tradition the best out of all available at the time. Rafael Rodriguez also views Weeden as critically misunderstanding Bailey's work. When Bailey referred to traditions as "authentic", he used the word to say that accounts were stable for decades after an event, not that they were necessarily historical from the beginning; Bailey's point was that oral tradition preserved information largely the same with variation in minor details over substantial periods of time. Travis Derico, after extensively analyzing Weeden's critique, argues that it "fails in almost every respect". Craig Keener also criticized Weeden's claims against Bailey.

== Works ==
- The Cross and the Prodigal: The 15th Chapter of Luke seen through the eyes of Middle Eastern peasants, Concordia, 1973. ISBN 0-570-03139-7.
- God is: Dialogues on the nature of God for young people, Mandate Press, 1976. ISBN 0878081496.
- Poet and Peasant: A Literary-Cultural Approach to the Parables of Luke, Eerdmans, 1976. ISBN 0-8028-3476-0.
- Through Peasant Eyes: More Lucan parables, their culture and style., Eerdmans, 1980. ISBN 0-8028-3528-7.
- Poet and Peasant and Through Peasant Eyes, Eerdmans, 1983. ISBN 0-8028-1947-8.
- Finding the Lost: Cultural Keys to Luke 15, Concordia, 1992. ISBN 0-570-04563-0.
- Jacob and the Prodigal: How Jesus Retold Israel’s Story, InterVarsity, 2003. ISBN 0-8308-2727-7
- God Is … Dialogues on the Nature of God, Guardian, 2005. ISBN 1554520231.
- Open Hearts in Bethlehem (A Christmas Musical), Westminster John Knox Press, 2005. ISBN 0-664-22872-0.
- The Cross and the Prodigal: The 15th Chapter of Luke seen through the eyes of Middle Eastern peasants, Second Edition, InterVarsity, 2005. ISBN 0-8308-3281-5.
- Jesus Through Middle Eastern Eyes, InterVarsity Press, 2008. ISBN 978-0-8308-2568-4.
- Paul Through Mediterranean Eyes, InterVarsity Press, 2011. ISBN 978-0-8308-3934-6.
- Open Hearts in Bethlehem: A Christmas Drama (Open Hearts in Bethlehem Set), InterVarsity Press, 2013. ISBN 978-0-8308-3757-1.
- The Good Shepherd, InterVarsity Press, 2014. ISBN 978-0-8308-4063-2.
