= Homosexuality in ancient Egypt =

Egyptological understandings of homosexuality

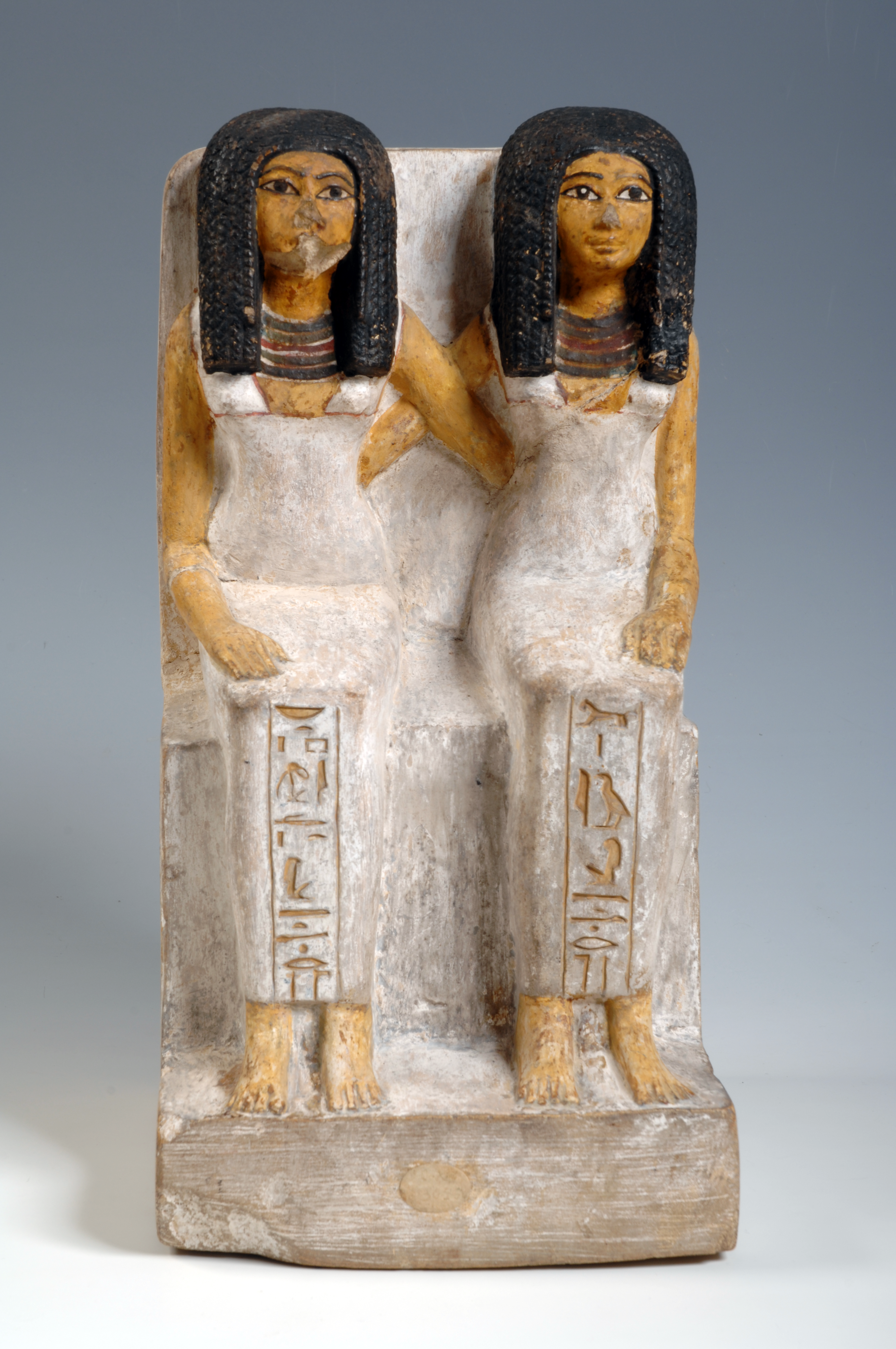
Statue of two women, Idet and Ruiu, depicted in a form typical to married couples, Museo Egizio

Homosexuality in ancient Egypt is a disputed subject within Egyptology. Historians and egyptologists alike debate what kinds of views the ancient Egyptians' society fostered about homosexuality. Only a handful of direct clues survive, and many possible indications are vague and subject to speculation.

== Depictions of possible homosexuality ==
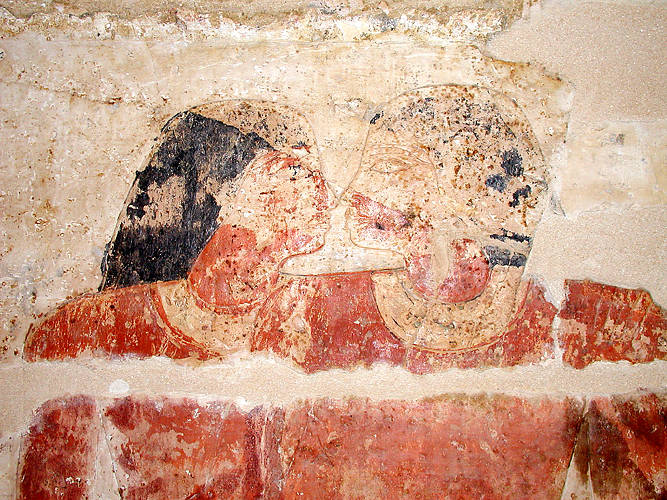
Nyankh-khnum and Khnum-hotep touching noses.

=== Nyankh-khnum and Khnum-hotep ===
The best known case of possible homosexuality in ancient Egypt is that of the two high officials Nyankh-Khnum and Khnum-hotep. Both men lived and served under pharaoh Niuserre during the 5th Dynasty (c. 2494–2345 BC). Nyankh-Khnum and Khnum-hotep each had families of their own with children and wives, but when they died their families apparently decided to bury them together in the same mastaba tomb. In this mastaba, several paintings depict both men embracing each other and touching their faces nose-on-nose. These depictions leave plenty of room for speculation, because in ancient Egypt the nose-on-nose touching normally represented a kiss.

Egyptologists and historians disagree about how to interpret the paintings of Nyankh-khnum and Khnum-hotep. Some scholars believe that the paintings reflect an example of homosexuality between two married men and prove that the ancient Egyptians accepted same-sex relationships. Other scholars disagree and interpret the scenes as an evidence that Nyankh-khnum and Khnum-hotep were twins, or even possibly conjoined twins. No matter what interpretation is correct, the paintings show at the very least that Nyankh-khnum and Khnum-hotep must have been very close to each other in life as in death.

=== King Pepi II and his general officer Sasenet ===
A well known story, dating back to the Middle Kingdom, tells about an anonymous citizen, who comes to the audience hall of king Pepi II (here named by his birth name, Neferkarê). The citizen wants to lament about an unnamed circumstance, but the king does not want to listen to the laments, so he orders his royal musicians to drown the stranger's speech with noise. Disappointed, the stranger leaves the palace. When this happens several times, he orders his friend, the high official Tjeti, to follow the king. The king in turn is frequently leaving the palace during the night. Tjeti finds out that king Pepi II keeps visiting his loyal general officer Sasenet for several hours, then returning home.

The chapter in which king Pepi II visits his loyal general officer is subject of passionate discussions. Especially one certain phrase stays in the centre of investigations: the text says, that "his majesty went into Sasenet's house and did to him what his majesty desired". The phrase "doing what one desires" is a common flowery phrase to describe sex. For this reason, some scholars are convinced that the papyrus reveals king Pepi's homosexual interests and his same-sex relationship with his general officer. But other scholars are instead convinced that the passage is merely an allegoric pun to religious texts, in which the sun god Râ visits the underworld god Osiris during the middle four hours of the night. Thus, king Pepi II would be taking the role of Râ and Sasenet would take the role of Osiris. The phrase "doing what one desires" would therefore be overrated and misinterpreted.

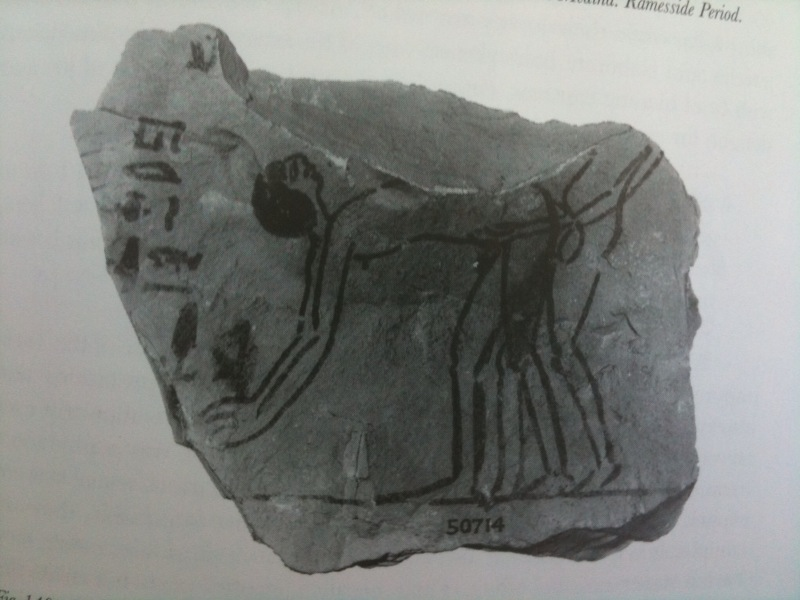
A Ramesside period ostracon, depicting a homosexual couple in coitus (two men having sex together)

=== Horus and Set ===
A prominent story in Egyptian mythology is a sexual assault on a younger god by an older rival god, Horus and Set. Allusions to this story first appear in the Pyramid Texts, from the Egyptian Old Kingdom, and continue to appear throughout Egyptian history. The two most complete versions of the story appear in the Kahun Papyri (from the Middle Kingdom period) and the Contendings of Horus and Set (New Kingdom period). The story indicates that the Egyptians viewed sexual penetration by another man as humiliating.

The Contendings of Horus and Set contains a nearly completely preserved story of the trial between Horus and Set to decide which one should hold the throne of Egypt. In one episode of the story, Set invites Horus to his house and plied him with alcohol. Later Set suggested they lay down in the bed. When lying together in one bed, Set attempts to penetrate Horus. Horus catches Set's semen with his hands and hides it. The next morning, Horus runs to his Mother, Isis, to tell her what happened. Isis chops off Horus's hands, and throws them in the river, then replaces them. She causes Horus to masturbate and use his semen to lubricate Set’s favorite food (Egyptian lettuce). Oblivious, Set eats the manipulated lettuce, and "ar[ises] pregnant with the seed of Horus." When Horus and Set return to the divine court, Set declares that he has performed the "work of a male" upon Horus. The divine court cries out and spits before Horus, but does not react negatively to Set, until it is revealed that Set's semen is in the river, where Isis threw the severed hands, while Horus's semen is inside of Set. Horus is then declared to be the victor of this encounter.

The passive role in this story is stigmatized, but the active role is not. There is no indication that Set's actions are motivated by desire. This is in contrast to the version preserved in the Kahun Papyri, where homosexual desire is indicated.

The Tale of Horus and Set in the Kahun Papyri is much more damaged than the version in Contendings, and is only a small fragment of what was probably a longer papyrus. The fragment begins with Set attempting to seduce Horus, saying: "How lovely is your backside!" Horus goes to tell Isis about this. Isis tells Horus to beware, and not to approach Set about it, but to wait for him to come back again. She seems to advise him to block Set's semen with his hands, and then to return to her, as she did in Contendings, although the fragmentary nature of the papyrus makes it hard to tell what she is saying near the end.

The actions of Horus and Isis in the story suggest that they believe the act to be the humiliation of a weaker rival. However, Set’s words to Horus suggests that Set is motivated by attraction. A comment later in the papyrus that this will be "sweet to his heart" may also suggest this, although it is unclear exactly what that is referring to. The explicit portrayal of same sex attraction is unusual for Egyptian literature. Given that Set is often associated with disruption and lawlessness, as well as sexual acts like adultery that were taboo in Ancient Egypt, him expressing this attraction may indicate that the Egyptians had negative views of it.

=== Others ===
Two military men named Ramose and Wepimose or Wepwawetrnose who dedicated Salakhana Stela CM004 might have been a couple.

Suty and Hor who are known of the famous stela, often regarded as a locus classicus of twins, could have been a male couple.

At Sheikh Fadl, there is a tomb dating to the 6th or 5th Century BCE with an Aramaic inscription apparently written by one member of a male couple to another, in which the speaker says "I cannot abandon him, I shall rest with him; I love Lekii (personal name?) very much."

== Ancient Egyptian views ==
It remains unclear what exact view the ancient Egyptians fostered about homosexuality. Any documents, or literature that contain stories involving sexual acts never name the nature of the sexual deeds but instead use flowery and euphemistic paraphrases. While the stories about Seth and his sexual behavior may reveal rather negative thoughts and views, the tomb inscription of Nyankh-khnum and Khnum-hotep may instead suggest that homosexuality was likewise accepted. Ancient Egyptian documents never clearly say that same-sex relationships were seen as reprehensible or despicable. No ancient Egyptian document mentions that homosexual acts were legally punishable offences, although a single reference to homosexuality in the Book of the Dead implies that it was frowned upon as a moral offence. Chapter CXXV contains the Negative Confession, in which the deceased presents himself before 42 gods, to each of whom he states that he is not guilty of committing a prescribed offence. The 27th confession, from the translation of the Papyrus of Nebseni, reads: "I have not committed acts of impurity, neither have I lain with men." A direct evaluation remains problematic.

== Talmudic literature ==
In Talmudic literature, the ancient Egyptians are known for their liberal sexual lifestyles and are often used as the prime example of sexual debauchery. Rashi, who lived in the 11th Century CE, describes an Egyptian practice for women to have multiple husbands. Maimonides refers to lesbianism as "the acts of Egypt." While polyandry and lesbianism are characteristics of the ancient Egyptians according to religious Jewish discourse, male-male homosexual relationships are usually attributed to Sodom, Gomorrah, and Amalek.

== See also ==
- Ashmolean Parchment AN 1981.940, a Coptic male homosexual love charm written in Hermopolitan dialect
- Timeline of LGBT history (lesbian, gay, bisexual, transgender related history)
