= Eleonore Cellard =

French scholar

Academic background
- Education: INALCO (BA, MA, PhD); École normale supérieure (BA); Catholic University of Paris (BA)

Academic work
- Discipline: Arabic studies
- Sub-discipline: Quranic studies; Codicology; Arabic palaeography

Eléonore Cellard is a French scholar who specializes in Arabic palaeography and codicology, particularly Quranic manuscripts. She started her research on the Quran in 2008. To do so, she learned the Arabic language and studied Arabic literature. She is a post-doctoral fellow at the Collège de France.

She discovered evidence of Coptic "lower text" (erased text) on a palimpsest page whose upper text was a page of an 8th century Quranic manuscript in Arabic. The Coptic writing was determined to be a portion of the biblical Book of Deuteronomy.
