= Coptic magical papyri =

Magical texts in Coptic language

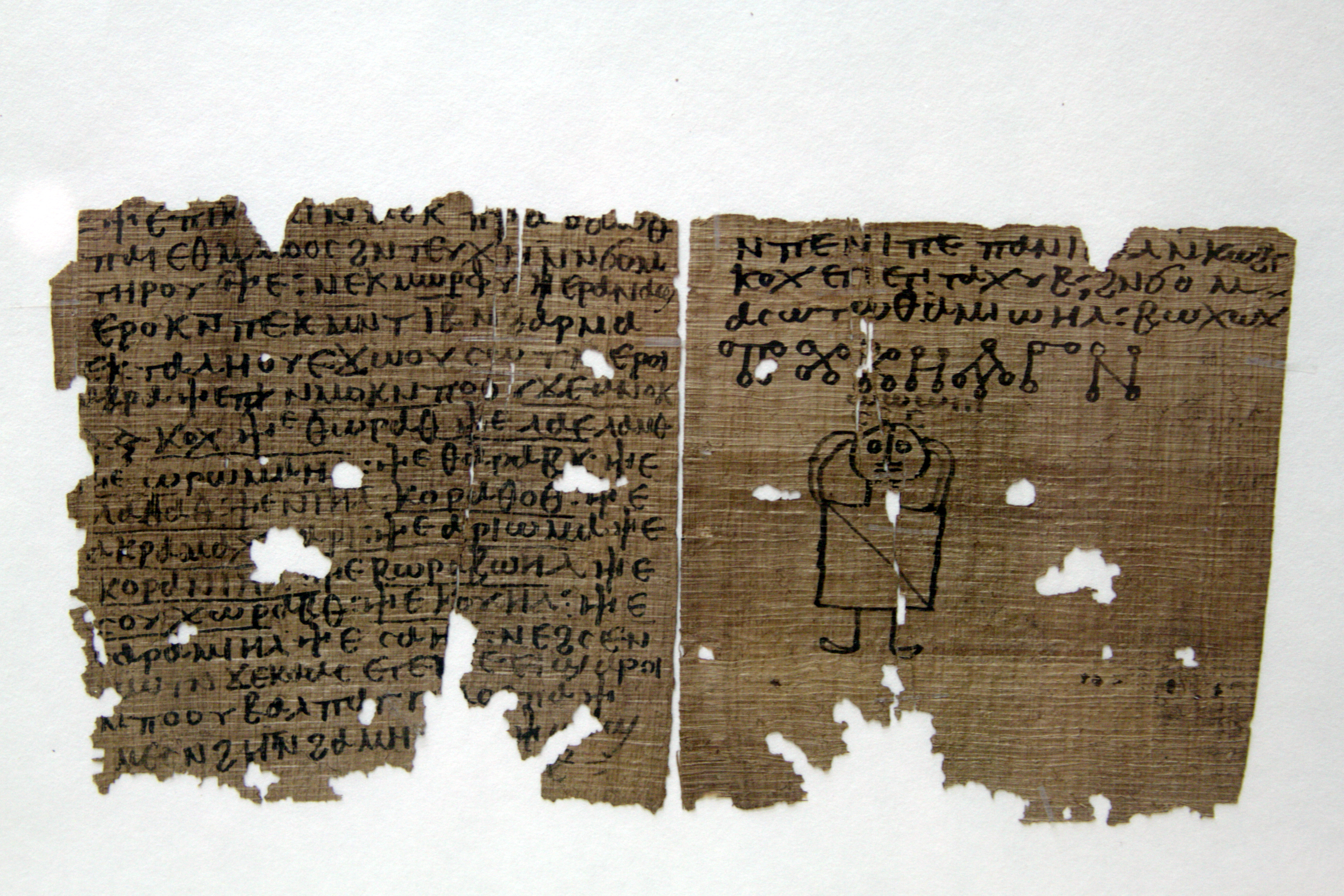
Coptic magical papyrus from th 5th or 6th century, now in Milan

Coptic magical papyri are magical texts in the Coptic language. There are approximately 600 such texts. The majority date to between the 4th and 12th centuries AD, although there are some Old Coptic texts from the 1st through 4th centuries. There are also bilingual texts in Coptic and Greek or Arabic. Although the texts are collectively known as papyri and the majority are written on papyrus, the corpus as studied and published includes texts on parchment, rag paper, wooden tablets, ostraca and limestone flakes. Generally, older texts are on papyrus and younger ones on paper. Parchment texts are more evenly distributed.

The Coptic magical tradition originates from the Greek magical tradition in Egypt. "Virtually all" its texts were produced by Coptic Christians in Egypt. This took place in spite of clerical opposition to magic. Besides texts from a Christian milieu, there are also Manichaean and Gnostic texts.

The Coptic magical papyri have been the subject of two research projects at the University of Würzburg: Vernacular Religion in Late Roman and Early Islamic Egypt (2018–2023) and the ongoing Corpus of Coptic Magical Formularies (2024–2027). All known Coptic magical texts may be found in the projects' online Kyprianos database.

== See also ==
- Magic in the Greco-Roman world
- Ashmolean Parchment AN 1981.940

== Bibliography ==
- Dosoo, Korshi; Preininger, Markéta, eds. (2023). Papyri Copticae Magicae: Coptic Magical Texts. Vol. 1: Formularies. De Gruyter. doi:10.1515/9783111080109.
- Meyer, Marvin; Smith, Richard (1999). "Introduction". In Marvin Meyer; Richard Smith (eds.). Ancient Christian Magic: Coptic Texts of Ritual Power. Princeton University Press. pp. 1–9.
- Smith, Richard (1999). "Ritual Power in Coptic Gnostic Texts: Introduction". In Marvin Meyer; Richard Smith (eds.). Ancient Christian Magic: Coptic Texts of Ritual Power. Princeton University Press. pp. 59–62.
