= John S. Kloppenborg =

Canadian academic (born 1951)

John Kloppenborg
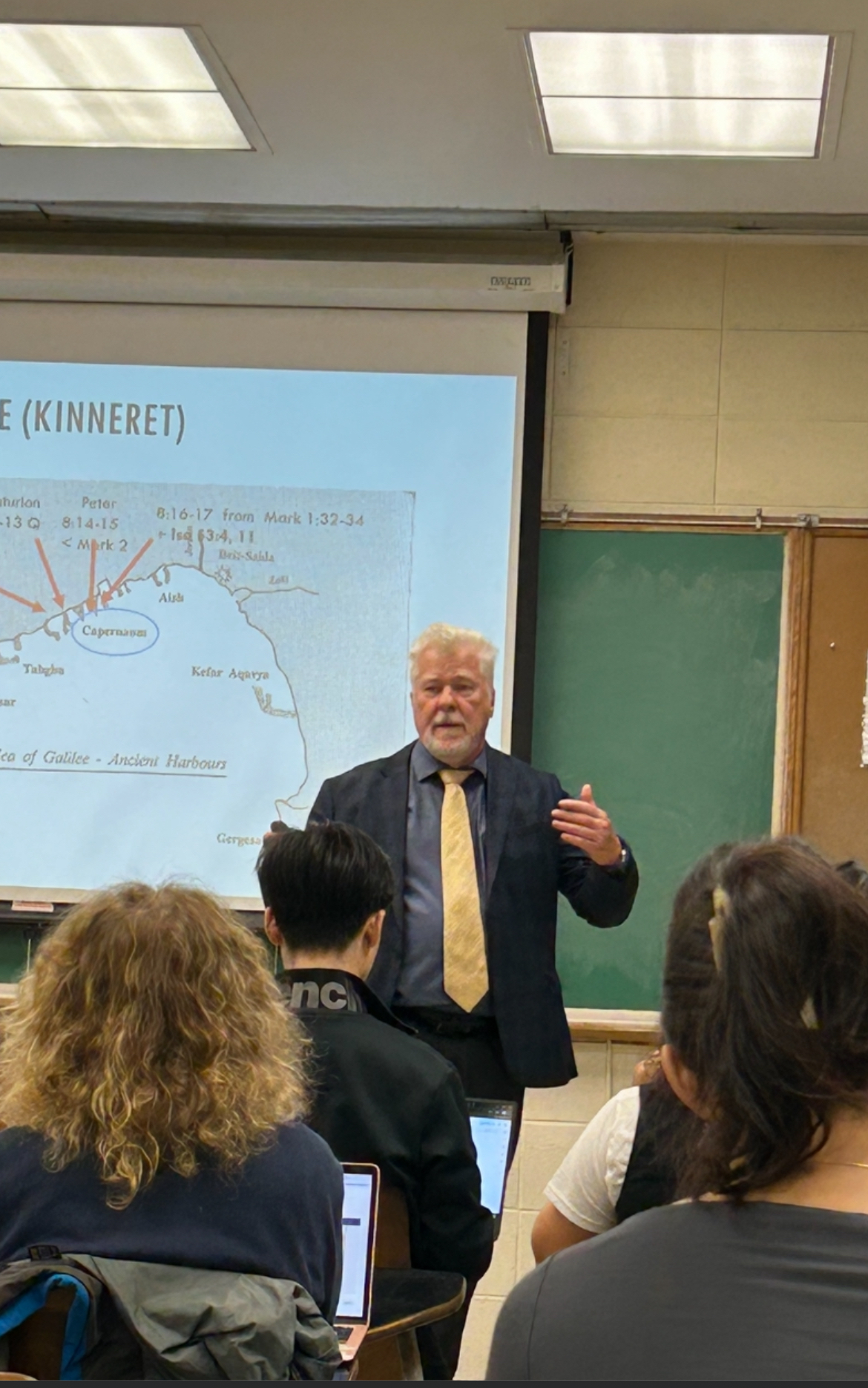
- Kloppenborg lecturing at the University of Toronto, October 2025
- Born: 1951 (age 74–75)

Academic background
- Education: University of St. Michael's College; University of Lethbridge
- Doctoral advisor: Heinz O. Guenther

Academic work
- Institutions: University of Toronto

John S. Kloppenborg (born 1951) is a Canadian professor of religious studies with expertise in Greco-Roman culture, Judean culture and Christian origins, particularly the synoptic gospels and Q-source. Kloppenborg is at the University of Toronto since 2007, where he holds the title of university professor. He was elected a member of the Studiorum Novi Testamenti Societas in 1990, and was elected as a Fellow of the Royal Society of Canada in 2014. In 2019-2020 he served as the president of the Studiorum Novi Testamenti Societas. He is also a member of the Context Group, the Society of Biblical Literature, and the Canadian Society of Biblical Studies. He was awarded honorary doctorates from the University of Lethbridge (2011) and the University of Pretoria (2018)

== Biography ==
Kloppenborg received his M.A. (1977) and his Ph.D. (1984) at the University of St. Michael's College (a federated university of the University of Toronto). He has taught and conducted research in Toronto, Windsor, United Kingdom, Helsinki, Jerusalem, Cambridge, Calgary, and the United States at Claremont Graduate University. He was one of the general editors of the International Q Project.

== Research contributions ==
John Kloppenborg studies the origins of Christianity, early Christian documents and the history of Second Temple Judaism. He has researched and written most substantially about the Q document, also known as the Sayings Gospel Q. This hypothetical document would be one of the oldest circulating sources of the sayings of Jesus. It is hypothesized as prior to, and known to the authors of the Gospel of Matthew, the Gospel of Luke, and is similar in some ways to the (non-synoptic) Gospel of Thomas. He has also worked extensively on the Synoptic problem and co-edited a major collection in 2011 on the centenary of the publication of William Sanday's Oxford Studies in the Synoptic Problem (1911).

Kloppenborg has also done original research and written on the social world of the early Jesus movement in Jewish Palestine, cultic associations and occupational guilds in the eastern Roman Empire and the social significance of the parables of Jesus. Other areas of interest have been the letters of the New Testament, especially the Letter of James, and the culture of the Graeco-Roman world as relates to such matters as: religion, spirituality, cultic associations, ethnic sub-groups and their ancient organization, professional societies and the general conditions of the societies in the Near East during the time of Second Temple Judaism, the time of Jesus and the formation of the Bible as we know it.

== Tenants in the Vineyard ==
Published in 2006, Kloppenborg's book, The Tenants in the Vineyard: Ideology, Economics, and Agrarian Conflict in Jewish Palestine, on the "tenants in the vineyard" parable attributed to Jesus by the New Testament, provides an analysis for the critical reader of the Bible of this very difficult parable. A version of the parable in Mark 12:1-12 and it is also recorded in the Gospel of Thomas (65). In his book, Kloppenborg models a new approach to the parables of Jesus. He discusses the ideological interests engaged by the parable in modern times and over the history of the Christian Church. Next, he explains the conditions of the society in which the parable was first laid out, especially in regards to ancient viticulture. In his conclusions, Kloppenborg notes that the parable has ironically been interpreted from the viewpoint of those in power in politics and society rather than as a literary parable or as an "anti-power" parable, as it may have read in the original texts. He shows that the editing in Mark's version of the story takes it beyond the useful idiom common to Jesus' other parables. Kloppenborg also includes a lengthy appendix of papyri that deal with ancient viticulture and agrarian conflict.

== The Critical Edition of Q ==
Published in 2000, by James M. Robinson, Paul Hoffmann, and John S. Kloppenborg, The Critical Edition of Q: Synopsis including the Gospels of Matthew and Luke, Mark and Thomas with English, German, and French Translations of Q and Thomas is a groundbreaking, though still controversial, work of scholarship.

Containing a lengthy introduction by bible scholar James M. Robinson and a foreword by the three editor scholars: Robinson, John S. Kloppenborg and Paul Hoffmann, this hefty volume provides a redacted version of what the original Q document might have looked like whether it was written in Greek or Aramaic. The Critical Edition of Q is the product of the International Q Project (IQP), a program inaugurated at the Society of Biblical Literature in 1985 that has sought to establish an accessible critical edition of the source shared by Matthew and Luke.

Their work also seeks to "document the major turning points in the history of Q research, with particular attention to the problem of establishing a critical text of Q" (xix). Putting aside "a purely hypothetical Aramaic source" of Matthew and Luke, which would mean that "Q would never be more than a hypothesis," Robinson claims, in the introduction, that such approaches have been "completely replaced by objective criteria, based on empirical observation of Matthean and Lukan redactional traits" (xix). The bulk of the text is the critical text of Q (1-561), which concludes with a concordance of Q (Greek words [563-81]). The volume also contains a discussion of divergences from the Lukan sequence (lxxxix), text-critical notes (xc-cvi), and end-pages (cvii). The critical text itself is formatted with eight columns on facing pages:

1. any Markan parallel to Matthew
2. any doublets found in Matthew
3. the text in Matthew that is deemed to be derived from Q
4. the critical text of Q
5. the text in Luke that is deemed to be derived from Q
6. Luke's doublets
7. any Markan parallel to Luke
8. any parallel from the Gospel of Thomas, the Coptic of which is provided but also retroverted into Greek

As footnotes, the Thomas and Q texts are translated into English, French and German.

The editors intend this volume to be functional as a standard research tool for the study of Q despite the continuing controversy over the validity of the text actually existing; this is the most comprehensive effort to provide such a tool nonetheless.

== Publications ==
- The Sayings Gospel Q in Greek and English with Parallels from the Gospels of Mark and Thomas, Contributions to Biblical Exegesis & Theology vol. 30 with James M. Robinson and Paul Hoffmann.
- Documenta Q edited by James M. Robinson, John S. Kloppenborg, and Paul Hoffmann, with contributions from the International Q Project.
- Ptolemaic and Early Roman Egypt. Vol. III of Greco-Roman Associations: Texts, Translations, and Commentary. BZNW, vol. 246. Berlin and New York: Walter de Gruyter, 2020. doi:10.1515/9783110710397.
- Christ’s Associations: Connecting and Belonging in the Ancient City (New Haven: Yale University Press, 2019)
- Luke on Jesus, Paul, and Earliest Christianity: What Did He Really Know? with Joseph Verheyden (Leuven: Peeters, 2017)
- The Jesus tradition in the Catholic Epistles with Alicia Batten (London: Bloomsbury Academic, 2014)
- Synoptic Problems: Collected Essays (Tübingen: Mohr Siebeck, 2014)
- Associations in the Greco-Roman World: A Sourcebook (with Richard S. Ascough and Philip A. Harland) (Waco, TX: Baylor University Press, 2012)
- Attica, Central Greece Macedonia, Thrace. Vol. 1 of Greco-Roman Associations: Texts, Translations, and Commentary (with Richard S. Ascough) (Berlin: Walter de Gruyter, 2011)
- Q: The Earliest Gospel (Louisville: Westminster/John Knox, 2008)
- The Tenants in the Vineyard: Ideology, Economics, and Agrarian Conflict in Jewish Palestine (Tübingen: Mohr Siebeck, 2006)
- Apocalypticism, Antisemitism and the Historical Jesus: Subtexts in Criticism Journal for the Study of the New Testament, Supplement Series, vol. 275 with John W. Marshall (Sheffield: Sheffield Academic, 2005)
- Excavating Q: The History and Setting of the Sayings Gospel (Minneapolis: Fortress Press, 2000)
- The Critical Edition of Q with James M. Robinson and Paul Hoffmann (Hermeneia; Minneapolis: Fortress; Leuven: Peeters, 2000)
- Voluntary Associations in the Graeco-Roman World with Stephen Wilson (London: Routledge, 1996)
- Conflict and Invention (Valley Forge, Pa.: Trinity Press Int'l, 1995)
- The Shape of Q: Signal Essays on the Sayings Gospel (Minneapolis: Fortress, 1994)
- Scriptures and Cultural Conversations: Essays for Heinz Guenther at Sixty-five Toronto Journal of Theology 8/1 (1992).
- Early Christianity, Q and Jesus, ed. with Leif E. Vaage Semeia, vol. 55. Atlanta: Scholars Press, 1991.
- Q-Thomas Reader (1988) with Michael G. Steinhauser, Stephen Patterson, and Marvin W. Meyer
- Q Parallels: Synopsis, Critical Notes & Concordance (Sonoma: Polebridge Press, 1988)
- The Formation of Q: Trajectories in Ancient Wisdom Collections (Minneapolis: Fortress Press, 1987)
- Numerous articles by John S. Kloppenborg are found on his academia.edu site: https://utoronto.academia.edu/JohnKloppenborg
