= Codex Tchacos =

4th century Coptic manuscript

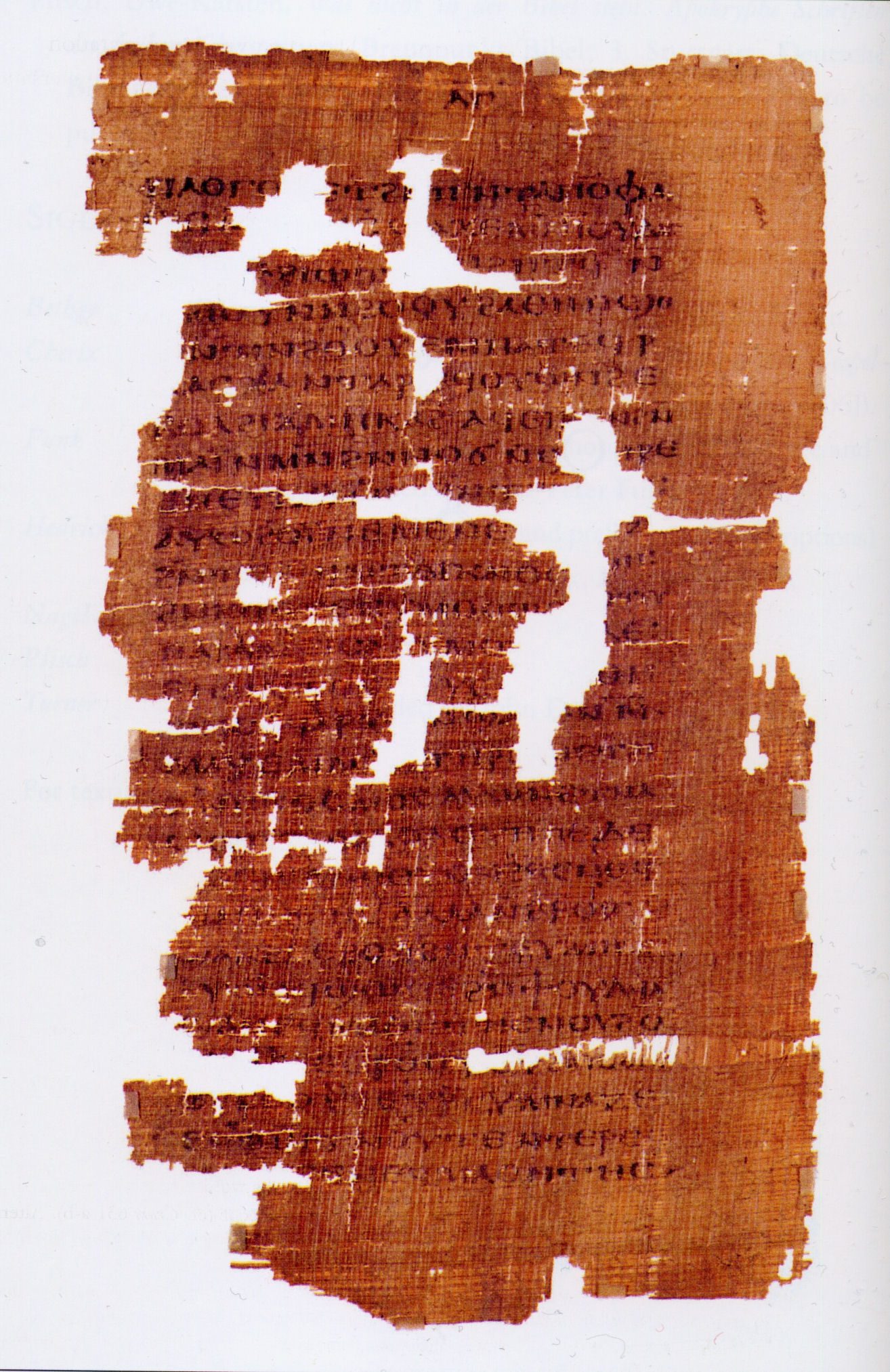
First page of the Gospel of Judas (p. 33)

Codex Tchacos is an ancient Egyptian Coptic codex from approximately 300 AD. It contains four tractates of early Christian Gnostic texts: the Letter of Peter to Philip, the First Apocalypse of James, the Gospel of Judas, and a fragment of The Temptation of Allogenes (a different text from the previously known Nag Hammadi Library text Allogenes).

Codex Tchacos is important because it contains the first known surviving copy of the Gospel of Judas, a text that was rejected as heresy by the early Christian church and lost for 1700 years. The Gospel of Judas was mentioned and summarized by the Church Father Irenaeus of Lyons in his work Against Heresies. This would date the Gospel of Judas to some time prior to Irenaeus' writing, and therefore older than the codex itself.

== The Codex ==
=== History ===
The dating of the codex is usually set at 220-340AD, but may be as late as the early 5th century.

The codex was rediscovered near El Minya, Egypt, during the 1970s (possibly 1978), and stored in a variety of unorthodox ways by various dealers who had little experience with antiquities. One stored it in a safe deposit box and another actually froze the documents, causing a unique and difficult kind of decay that makes the papyrus appear sandblasted. (Archivists can do nothing to remedy this damage since it is caused by the outer layers of the papyrus flaking off - taking ink with them.) Scholars heard rumors of the text from the 1980s onward as dealers periodically offered it for sale (displaying portions of the text or photographs of portions of the text in the process).

It was not examined and translated until 2001 after its current owner, Frieda Nussberger-Tchacos, concerned with its deteriorating condition, transferred it to the Maecenas Foundation for Ancient Art in Basel, Switzerland. She named it in honor of her father, Dimaratos Tchacos.

Roughly a dozen pages of the original manuscript, seen briefly by scholars in the 1970s, are missing from the Codex today; it is believed that they were sold secretly to dealers, but none have come forward. According to National Geographic's website, fragments purported to be from the codex may also be part of an Ohio antiquities dealer's estate.

=== Translation ===
The Maecenas Foundation worked with the Waitt Institute for Historical Discovery and the National Geographic Society to restore and translate the codex.

In April 2006, a complete translation of the text, with extensive footnotes, was released by the National Geographic Society: The Gospel Of Judas (ISBN 1-4262-0042-0, April 2006). The Society also created a two-hour television documentary, The Gospel of Judas, which aired worldwide on the National Geographic Channel on April 9, 2006. A special issue of National Geographic magazine was also devoted to the Gospel of Judas.

A critical edition of the Codex Tchacos, including complete, near life-sized color photographs of 26 pages, a revised transcription of the Coptic, and complete translation of the codex was published by National Geographic Society in 2007. The team also hopes to look at the cartonnage (a sort of paper-mâché used to stiffen the codex's cover) in order to find clues about who made the codex and when/where. (As a book, the Tchacos Codex may be older than the twelve surviving codices of the Nag Hammadi Library.)

=== New discovery ===
In 2012, two more fragments of the codex were discovered in the Special Collections library of Lafayette College, Easton, Pennsylvania.
