= Werner Kelber =

Biblical scholar

Werner H. Kelber is a biblical scholar who specializes in the Gospel of Mark. He taught religious studies at Rice University. He is the author of The Oral and Written Gospel (1983), and became known for approaching biblical studies through an understanding of oral tradition. The scholar David Rhodes wrote that "It is difficult to overestimate the significance" of Kelber's biblical studies. As of 2010, Kelber was Isla Carroll and Percy E. Turner Professor Emeritus of Biblical Studies at Rice.

== Biography ==
Kelber attended the University of Erlangen–Nuremberg, LMU Munich, and University of Tübingen. In 1974, he was an assistant professor of religious studies at Rice University. By 1984 he was professor and had written four books on the Gospel of Mark. By 1995, he was the chair of the university's religious studies department.
