= Marvin Meyer =

American scholar of religion (1948–2012)

- Born: Marvin Wayne Meyer; April 16, 1948; Grand Rapids, Michigan, U.S.
- Died: August 16, 2012 (aged 64); Los Angeles, California, U.S.
- Occupation: Scholar of religion

Academic work
- Institutions: Chapman University
- Main interests: Gnosticism, early Christianity

Marvin W. Meyer (April 16, 1948 – August 16, 2012) was a scholar of religion and a tenured professor at Chapman University, in Orange, California.

== Career ==
Meyer was the Griset Professor of Bible and Christian Studies at Chapman University and Director of the Albert Schweitzer Institute. He was also Director of the Coptic Magical Texts Project of the Institute for Antiquity and Christianity. Dr. Meyer authored numerous books and articles on Greco-Roman and Christian religions in antiquity and late antiquity, and on Albert Schweitzer's ethic of reverence for life. He had been interviewed on television programs that aired on ABC, BBC, CNN, PBS, A&E, the Discovery Channel, the History Channel, and the National Geographic Channel.

Meyer was best known for his translations of the texts of documents associated with the ancient mystery religions, early Christian magic, and Gnostic texts, of which the most notable have been the Gospel of Thomas and the Gospel of Judas, the former of which is included among the Nag Hammadi library. Meyer edited a collection of English translations of the Nag Hammadi texts for the HarperOne imprint, the most recently revised edition of which has been released as the Nag Hammadi Scriptures in 2007, including help from James M. Robinson who has edited an earlier publication of the library. He was regarded as an authority on Gnosticism and had worked on many books on the subject.

== Death ==
Meyer died of melanoma on August 16, 2012.
