= James M. Robinson =

American biblical scholar (1924–2016)

- Born: June 30, 1924
- Died: March 22, 2016 (aged 91)
- Known for: Member of the Jesus Seminar

James McConkey Robinson (June 30, 1924 – March 22, 2016) was an American scholar who retired as Professor Emeritus of Religion at Claremont Graduate University, Claremont, California, specializing in New Testament Studies and Nag Hammadi Studies. He was a member of the Jesus Seminar and arguably the most prominent Q and Nag Hammadi library scholar of the twentieth century. He was also a major contributor to The International Q Project, acting as an editor for most of their publications. Particularly, he laid the groundwork for John S. Kloppenborg's foundational work into the compositional history of Q, by arguing its genre as an ancient wisdom collection. He also was the permanent secretary of UNESCO's International Committee for the Nag Hammadi codices. He is known for his work on the Medinet Madi library, a collection of Coptic Manichaean manuscripts.

== Biography ==
Robinson was educated at Davidson College (BA), Columbia Theological Seminary (BD), University of Basel (D.Theol., 1952), and Princeton Theological Seminary (PhD, 1955). Robinson was an ordained Presbyterian minister. While at Basel, Robinson studied with Karl Barth and Oscar Cullmann. But during that time he also would take the train to Marburg, Germany, in order to hear Rudolf Bultmann lecture at the University of Marburg. It was in that context that he began to be shaped by Bultmann's existentialist theology and philosophy. His Basel dissertation was never published, but his Princeton dissertation was published as The Problem of History in Mark (1957). His first teaching position was at Candler School of Theology at Emory University (1952-1958) in Atlanta, Georgia. He then taught at Claremont (first at Claremont School of Theology [1958-1964] and then Claremont Graduate School later University [1964-1999]); at the Graduate School he held an endowed chair, the Arthur Letts, Jr., Professor of Religion. He was the recipient of a Guggenheim Fellowship in 1970. He was also the Director of the Institute for Antiquity and Christianity.

He was the son of William Childs Robinson (1897-1982), who taught church history and apologetics at Columbia Theological Seminary. His brother William taught New Testament at Perkins School of Theology and then Andover Newton Theological School.

He has received criticism from philosopher and apologist William Lane Craig regarding his views on Jesus' resurrection appearances. Robinson argued that these appearances had their origins in second-century Gnosticism. Craig argues that there is no reason to believe that all of these experiences were luminous, and even if they were, that they were interpreted as non-physical appearances. Robinson died in March 2016 at the age of 91.

== Works ==
=== Books ===
- Robinson, James M. (1957). The Problem of History in Mark. Studies in Biblical Theology. Vol. 1/21. London: SCM Press. ISBN 9780334013099. OCLC 6029012.
- ——— (1959). A New Quest of the Historical Jesus. Studies in Biblical Theology. Vol. 1/25. London: SCM Press. OCLC 806421825.
- ———; Koester, Helmut (1971). Trajectories Through Early Christianity. Philadelphia, PA: Fortress. ISBN 9780800600587. OCLC 153829.
- ———; Patterson, Stephen J. (1998). The Fifth Gospel: The Gospel of Thomas Comes of Age. Harrisburg, PA: Trinity Press International. ISBN 9780567178268. OCLC 741687257.
- ——— (2005). The Gospel of Jesus: In Search of the Original Good News. San Francisco, CA: HarperSanFrancisco. ISBN 9780060762179. OCLC 59818196.
- ——— (2005). Heil, Christoph; Verheyden, Joseph (eds.). The Sayings Gospel Q: Collected Essays. Bibliotheca Ephemeridum theologicarum Lovaniensium. Vol. 189. Leuven: Peeters.
- ——— (2006). The Secrets of Judas: The Story of the Misunderstood Disciple and His Lost Gospel. New York: HarperSanFrancisco.
- ——— (2007). Jesus according to the Earliest Witness. Minneapolis, MN: Fortress.
- ——— (2008). Language, Hermeneutic, and History: Theology after Barth and Bultmann. Eugene, OR: Cascade Books.
- ——— (2010). The Story of the Bodmer Papyri: From the First Monastery's Library in Upper Egypt to Geneva and Dublin. Eugene, OR: Cascade Books.
- ——— (2013). The Manichaean Codices of Medinet Madi. Eugene, OR: Cascade Books.
- ——— (2014). The Nag Hammadi Story: From the Discovery to the Publication. Nag Hammadi and Manichaean Studies 86. Vol. 2 vols. Leiden: Brill.

=== Edited by ===
- ———, ed. (1971). The Future of Our Religious Past: Essays in Honor of Rudolf Bultmann. New York: Harper & Row.
- ———, ed. (1977). The Nag Hammadi Library in English. Leiden: Brill.
- ———; Hoffmann, Paul; Kloppenborg, John S., eds. (2000). The Critical Edition of Q. Hermeneia Supplements. Minneapolis, MN: Fortress.
- ———; Hoffmann, Paul; Kloppenborg, John S., eds. (2002). The Sayings Gospel Q in Greek and English: with parallels from the Gospels of Mark and Thomas. Minneapolis, MN: Fortress. ISBN 9780800634940. OCLC 50729192.

=== Chapters ===
- ——— (1963). "Preaching". In Grant, Frederick C.; Rowley, H. H. (eds.). Hastings' Dictionary of the Bible (2nd - in single volume ed.). Edinburgh: T&T Clark. OCLC 2792346.
- ——— (1998). "Theological Autobiography". In Stone, Jon R. (ed.). The Craft of Religious Studies. New York: St. Martin's Press. pp. 117–150. ISBN 9780312177270. OCLC 925168109.

=== Bibliography ===
- ——— (1998). "Theological Autobiography". In Stone, Jon R. (ed.). The Craft of Religious Studies. New York: St. Martin's Press. pp. 117–150. ISBN 9780312177270. OCLC 925168109. - an additional biographical source

=== Obituary ===
- Hedrick, Charles W. "Liberator of the Nag Hammadi Library." Biblical Archaeology Society, July 16, 2016.
