= Gnostic Apocalypse of Peter =

Gnostic Christian text (c. 200 CE)

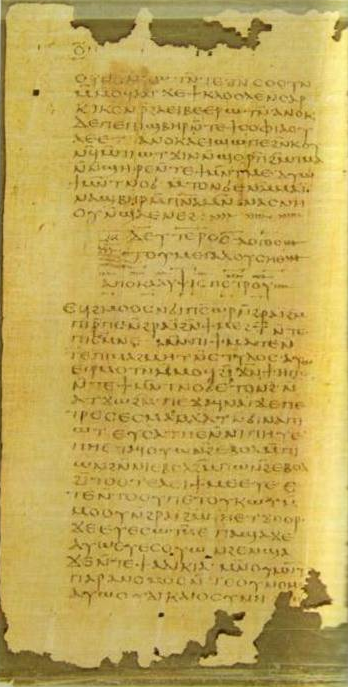
Codex VII of the Nag Hammadi library, page 70, which has the end of the Second Treatise of the Great Seth and the start of the Gnostic Apocalypse of Peter. While the text is in Coptic, the title in the center is retained in Greek: άποκάλυψης πέτρου (transl. Apocalypse [of] Peter).

The Gnostic Apocalypse of Peter, also known as the Coptic Apocalypse of Peter and Revelation of Peter, is the third tractate in Codex VII of the Nag Hammadi library. The work is associated with Gnosticism, a sect of early Christianity, and is considered part of the New Testament apocrypha and a work of apocalyptic literature. It was likely originally written in the Koine Greek language and composed around 200 CE. The surviving manuscript from Nag Hammadi is a poor-quality translation of the Greek into Coptic, and likely dates from the 4th century.

The work's author is unknown, although it is purportedly written by the disciple Peter (pseudepigrapha) describing revelations given to him during Holy Week. Jesus tells Peter "through you I have begun a work for the remnant whom I called to knowledge (gnosis)" and reveals secrets of the future. The work criticizes other Christian groups, comparing them to the blind and deaf. Jesus says that false Christians (presumably the proto-orthodox movement) will hold power for a time, and that they will be haughty, oppose the truth, set up bishops and deacons to rule, and mislead their followers. In contrast, certain blessed ones (presumably Gnostics) have immortal souls, and Jesus reassures Peter that they will eventually reign over the others. Peter has a vision of the coming crucifixion, and Jesus explains its true meaning in conversation. The text then propounds docetism: that the divine Christ, as a spiritual being, was invulnerable and never suffered the pains of the mortal world, and certainly did not die during the apparent crucifixion. Rather, only Jesus-the-man suffered in a variant of the substitution hypothesis.

== Contents ==
In the opening of the text, Jesus is sitting in a temple and talking to Peter about the importance of righteousness and knowledge. (Note: Presumably the Second Temple during Jesus's visit to Jerusalem during Holy Week, shortly before the Passion of Jesus. A few scholars have argued that the dialogue takes place after Jesus's resurrection in a heavenly temple, though.) Peter envisions that the priests and the people may try to kill them. Jesus tells Peter that the others are blind, and to put his hands over his own eyes and see the truth. When Peter does so, he sees a new light. Similarly, Peter listens to the priests and the people twice: first normally, and a second time with the "ears of [his] head", hearing praise of Jesus's glory. Jesus states that the people are both blind and deaf, and that many people will initially accept his teachings but will turn away due to the will of the "Father of their error". He also warns Peter to keep these revelations secret from the "children of this age".

Jesus continues, saying the upright and pure will be pushed towards death, while others will be lead astray by false teachings propounded by a deceiver with complicated doctrines. Some will proclaim evil teachings and say evil things against each other. These people will ask about dreams given by demons, and will be given destruction instead of immortality. Evil cannot produce good fruit; similarly, the souls of the current fallen age (aeon) are always a slave to their desires, and these souls are destined for eternal destruction. Immortal souls resemble mortal ones but do not reveal their true nature, and have lives of contemplation and faith. What does not really exist will dissolve into non-existence, and the deaf and blind will only join with their own kind.

The text describes the actions and attitudes of different groups of people who spread false information. Some individuals will be arrogant and haughty, yet envying pure souls. Others will be messengers of error, creating false laws and harsh fates. There will also be those who pretend to have authority from God and oppress others, but they will be punished. "Little ones" are discussed; the false teachers will rule over them for a time. However, these little ones will eventually rule over their oppressors, turning the tables of the situation. The Savior tells Peter not to be afraid, as the true God will bring judgment, and the futile efforts of the worldly opponents will be put to shame. Even as Peter stands in their midst, they will not understand, as the invisible one stands against them.

Peter has a vision of the crucifixion of Jesus. The vision reveals to Peter that the physical form of Jesus being crucified is not the true form of Jesus but only a substitute. The real Christ is the spiritual being who is filled with a Holy Spirit and is joyful, laughing at the lack of perception of those who thought they could kill him. This Jesus is seen as the intellectual Pleroma, which is united with the Holy Spirit and the perfect light. The teachings of this vision should be preserved and given to foreigners of a different age. Finally, Jesus again encourages Peter to be courageous and not to fear, since he will be with Peter and none of his enemies will be able to harm him. After this vision, Peter comes back to reality.

== Authorship, date, and manuscript ==
The author of the original Greek text is unknown, but he is speculated to have written at some point from the late second century to the third century (c. 150–300 CE), with the most likely option the early third century (c. 200–250 CE). Birger A. Pearson proposed that the author was probably Egyptian, although other scholars have suggested Palestinian or Syrian origins. The surviving manuscript from Nag Hammadi is a poor-quality translation of the Greek into Coptic, and likely dates from the fourth century. The dialect of the written text is Sahidic Coptic, with some traits from Bohairic Coptic. While the manuscript is in excellent condition as far as reading the text, many puzzling and illogical passages suggest translation errors.

The Nag Hammadi library was discovered in 1945, but due to a variety of reasons, it was not until 1972 that a reproduction of Codex VII was published and available to the public. The manuscript is held in the Coptic Museum in Old Cairo. The section of Codex VII with the Apocalypse of Peter is 14 pages long, from page 70 to page 84. As there is only a single manuscript extant, citations to passages are done via page number and line number.

== Literary influences ==
The Apocalypse of Peter is generally classed as part of apocalyptic literature in genre and inspiration. The Greek term apokalypsis literally means "revelation", and refers to an uncovering of divine secrets. The work features a few probable allusions to Greek Christian texts that would eventually be included in the New Testament, but no references to Jewish scripture nor to non-canonical Christian and Jewish works. These allusions do not directly call these works established scripture; there are no formulas saying "As it was written" or "Scripture says" before these allusions, nor are they identified directly. This suggests at least something of a shared background material between Gnostic Christians and proto-orthodox Christians of the era, even if the Gnostic interpretation of the Passion was very different.

The author appears to be familiar with the Gospel of Matthew and emulates it in several passages, although does not directly quote it. The affectionate use of "little ones" is shared by both works. It also repurposes some of the anti-Jewish rhetoric from Matthew, except aimed at other Christians. Both the opponents warned of by Jesus in the Apocalypse of Peter, as well as the scribes and Pharisees in Matthew, love places of honor, keep others out of the kingdom, and are spiritually "blind". The Apocalypse of Peter itself calls both the Jewish leaders who attempted to kill Jesus as well as Christians that oppose Gnosticism "blind", implicitly tying them together.

The work is also possibly influenced by the proto-orthodox epistle 2 Peter. 2 Peter condemns its opponents as "dry springs"; in the Gnostic Apocalypse of Peter, Jesus calls the false Christian opponents "dry canals".

Most scholars believe that the Gnostic Apocalypse of Peter has no relationship with the 2nd-century Apocalypse of Peter other than the title and the coincidence of both involving a revelation of Christ to Peter near the end of Jesus's life. The author of the Gnostic work does not appear to be familiar with it or reference it.

== Analysis ==
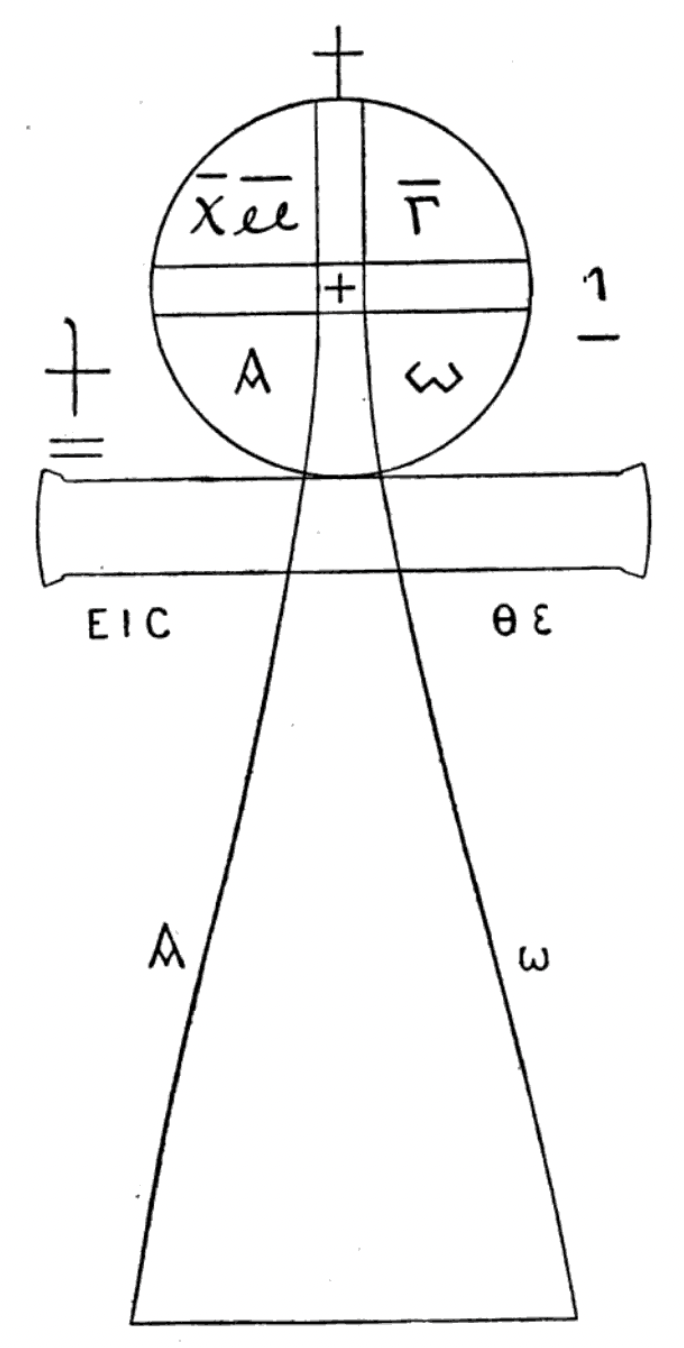
A Gnostic cross, from the Bruce Codex

=== Christology ===
The Savior said to me: "He whom you see above the cross, glad and laughing, is the living Jesus. But he into whose hands and feet they are driving the nails is his physical part, which is the substitute. They are putting to shame that which is in his likeness. But look at him and me."

— Apocalypse of Peter 81, 15-23

The vision near the end of the Apocalypse in which Jesus states that someone else was crucified rather than the living Jesus is considered a key part of the text by scholars, an example of a Gnostic Christology where Jesus is a docetic redeemer. Comparable language is used in the Second Treatise of the Great Seth, in which Jesus laughs at the ignorance of those who tried to kill him but failed to realize that he "did not die in reality but in appearance", as well as the mostly-lost Gospel of Basilides. In this view, the Savior is a transcendent, living spiritual presence. The evil archons sought to kill Jesus, but only succeeded in killing their own "son", the unimportant material part.

While Gnosticism and docetism both had a broad range of interpretations, in one docetic view seen in Gnosticism (called "separationist" by Bart Ehrman), Jesus was originally a mortal flesh-and-blood man who received the Holy Spirit and Christ from heaven, which enabled him to perform miracles and deliver wisdom in teaching. The Christ, as a being from heaven, could not be slain by the mortal world, and offered deliverance from the constraints of the mortal body. Docetism appears to have been a somewhat common view in 1st- and 2nd-century Christianity, but did not ultimately become the orthodox doctrine.

While the work is clear enough at distinguishing the mortal body of Jesus and his spiritual essence, the exact nature and breakdown of that spirit is not agreed upon entirely. It is unclear if the Holy Spirit, the intellectual pleroma, an incorporeal living body, and so on are separate aspects or divine beings, or merely different terms for the same divine unity. Jesus is referred to by several titles: Savior, Living One, Christ, Son of Man, Lord, and Revealed One. Several forms of address are given to (presumably) the highest god in the pleroma, the true God: living undefiled greatness who has revealed life; undefiled Father; invisible one.

=== Denunciation of other Christians ===
And there will be others of those who are outside our number who name themselves "bishop" and also "deacons", as if they have received their authority from God. They submit to the judgment of the leaders. Those people are dry canals.

— Apocalypse of Peter 79, 22-30

The text has a strong polemical aspect in inter-Christian debates. It emphasizes seeking truth and knowledge (gnosis), and warns that many people will be misled by false teachers: Christians who believed Jesus died, and that this death was what brought salvation in some sense. To the Gnostic view, proto-orthodox Christians completely misunderstood the divine nature of Jesus, and worshipped the "dead" mortal remnant. According to the Gnostic stance, the true Savior would certainly never die nor be able to be harmed at all. He was a transcendent Savior from a higher world. 74.13-15 directly states "And they will hold fast to the name of a dead man, while thinking that they will become pure". The work later echoes this condemnation while also possibly criticizing the Shepherd of Hermas or its author; it reads "For they will create an imitation remnant in the name of a dead man, who is Hermas, the first-born of unrighteousness, in order that the real light might not be believed." It seems to blame the intransigence of these rival Christians on "the father of their error": perhaps a reference to the Demiurge, the chief archon. Proto-orthodox Christians who view Jesus's death (rather than Christ's gnosis, the divine teachings and wisdom) as what is important for salvation "blaspheme the truth and proclaim an evil teaching." The work also mocks the pale imitation of the true teachings as a "sisterhood", in contrast to the "brotherhood" of true knowledge.

The likely intent of the author was to encourage its readers to persist in Gnostic Christianity despite being a minority: just as the enemies of the Savior were unable to stop him in his era, so too would the rival theologies to Gnostics be overcome as well. Henriette Havelaar suggests that the author's Gnostic community might have been part of a breakaway from a proto-orthodox community, given the shared background of the Passion yet differing interpretations of it. While the opponents denounced in the text probably included proto-orthodox early Catholics, the opponents may have included rival groups of Gnostics as well. One passage disparagingly refers to a nefarious man and a sensual woman: possibly a reference to Simon Magus and Helen, figures revered by some Gnostics.

The references to the misled "little ones" is sometimes read as condemning martyrdom, or more specifically innocents led into martyrdom by the false Christian opponents. While whether these passages are meant as a hostile reference to martyrdom is considered debatable, the work does not play up the glory of martyrdom, in contrast to proto-orthodox writings. Jesus and Peter are depicted as invincible, rather than as martyrs themselves.

=== Material world and spiritual world ===
Immortal souls are not like these (other souls) (...) She has faith, and desires to renounce these (material) things.

— Apocalypse of Peter 75, 26-27; 76, 2-4

In the Gnostic Apocalypse, Peter learns that what he sees with physical sight and hears with his ears is not the true reality; a deeper spiritual plane is more important. This theme recurs again in the explanation of the crucifixion: Jesus's material body is unimportant, and the spiritual being is what matters. The goal of salvation is to transcend the flesh. Similar themes are seen in other works of the Nag Hammadi corpus. This stands starkly in contrast with proto-orthodox Christian works that played up the importance of the fleshly body and a resurrection in the flesh on Earth.

Gnostic theology often separated the evil creator of the inferior material world (called Yaldabaoth in other Gnostic works, although not directly named as such in the Apocalypse of Peter) from the true God. Additionally, many Gnostic groups identified this inferior false god as the god of the Old Testament. The Apocalypse of Peter seems to endorse a version of early Christianity that makes a firmer separation from its Jewish roots. It calls the mortal world of the "clay vessel" (body) the "home of demons" and "belonging to Elohim, and belonging to the cross", with Elohim the Hebrew term for "god". The Savior also tells Peter that he should reserve this revelation for foreigners of a different age, presumably a reference to 2nd- and 3rd-century Gnostic Christians.

=== Choice of Peter as narrator ===
Peter, you are to become perfect in keeping with your name, along with me, the one who has chosen you, for through you I have begun a work for the remnant whom I called to knowledge.

— Apocalypse of Peter 71, 15-21

The Apocalypse of Peter is pseudepigrapha: a work written in the name of another person, both as a literary convention of the apocalyptic genre as well as to heighten the authority of its claims. In early Christianity, Peter's authority on matters of doctrine was unquestionable, so attributing favored theological views to Peter (in this work, docetism) was common as a way to buttress arguments that the writer's version of Christian doctrine was the correct one. The work does stand in contrast to some other Gnostic works which portray Peter less positively, such as the Gospel of Thomas, Gospel of Mary, and Pistis Sophia.

While the final line of the text, that "Peter came to his senses", can be interpreted literally as Peter finishing the vision, it is also possible that the line was meant to be interpreted theologically as Peter becoming enlightened. Jesus urges Peter to become perfect like him early in the text, and Gnostic theology generally held that receiving and understanding knowledge and wisdom was the key to spiritual growth. Thus, the final line can be interpreted as that by hearing this revelation, Peter had achieved the promise of Gnosticism: true knowledge had brought salvation.

== Translations ==
Translations of the Gnostic Apocalypse of Peter into English include:

- Brown, S. Kent; Griggs, C. Wilfred (1975). "The Apocalypse of Peter: Introduction and Translation". Brigham Young University Studies Quarterly. 15 (2): 131–145.
- Bullard, Roger A. (1988) [1981]. "Apocalypse of Peter (VII, 3)". In Wisse, Frederik (ed.). The Nag Hammadi Library in English (3rd ed.). Harper & Row. pp. 372–378.
- Brashler, James (1996). "NHC VII,3: Apocalypse of Peter: Text, Translation, and Notes". In Pearson, Birger (ed.). Nag Hammadi Codex VII. Brill. pp. 218–247. doi:10.1163/9789004437333_010.
- Havelaar, Henriette W. (1999). The Coptic Apocalypse of Peter (Nag-Hammadi-Codex VII,3). Akademie Verlag. pp. 30–53. doi:10.1515/9783110884449.
- Meyer, Marvin W. (2007). "The Revelation of Peter". The Nag Hammadi Scriptures. HarperOne. pp. 487–497.

== Bibliography ==
- Desjardins, Michel; Brashler, James (1996). "Introduction to VII,3 Apocalypse of Peter". In Pearson, Birger (ed.). Nag Hammadi Codex VII. Brill. pp. 201–247. doi:10.1163/9789004437333_010. ISBN 978-90-04-43733-3.
- Havelaar, Henriette W. (1999). The Coptic Apocalypse of Peter (Nag-Hammadi-Codex VII,3). TU 144. Akademie Verlag. doi:10.1515/9783110884449. ISBN 978-3-11-017332-1.
- Meyer, Marvin W. (2007). "The Revelation of Peter". The Nag Hammadi Scriptures. HarperOne. pp. 487–497. ISBN 9780060523787.
