= Astanphaeus =

Evil angel in Gnosticism

Astanphaeus (or Astaphaeus) is an evil angel in Gnosticism. He was seen as an Angel of the Presence, the seventh and last of them. He was associated with the planet Mercury. Among the elements he is associated with water, among the human body parts with hair

In the Adversus Haereses book (180 CE), Irenaeus wrote, that Ophites (a Christian Gnostic sect) considered Hebrew Bible prophets as spokesmen for evil gods of the lower world. Specifically, Ezra and Zephaniah were believed to belong to Astanphaeus.

In Sethian Gnosticism, Astanphaeus can be identified with the archon Astaphaios in Contra Celsum by Origen Adamantius. The archon, however, has a different planetary alignment than the angel: Venus, not Mercury.

== See also ==
- Ialdabaoth
- Archons
- Angels of the Presence
- Ogdoad
