= Hypostasis of the Archons =

Gnostic religious text

Hypostasis of the Archons, also translated The Reality of the Rulers, is a Gnostic religious text. Originally written in Greek in the second or third century CE, the only known copy is a Coptic translation found in Codex II of the Nag Hammadi library. The text is a hybrid of two sources recounting the subject of Norea, the sister of the biblical Seth. The first half retells the first six chapters of the Book of Genesis, while the second presents a revelation dialog between Norea and Eleleth, a "luminary" or angel-like being. The text closely parallels another Gnostic text, On the Origin of the World, which appears alongside it in the second Nag Hammadi codex.

Hypostasis combines elements from Jewish traditions, Greco-Roman and Egyptian myths, and the dialogues of Plato, especially Timaeus. In retelling the stories of Adam and Eve and the Flood, it inverts their traditional meaning. God's role in the original narrative is divided between four deities, including Yaldabaoth, a mocking caricature of the Old Testament God, and Sabaoth, who forms a covenant with the Jews but is not the ultimate source of salvation. Drawing on Platonic philosophy, the text portrays the material world as merely the imitation of a superior heavenly world. The Archons, creators of the material world, are presented as flawed, ignorant, and deceitful. Adam and Eve's consumption of the forbidden fruit is portrayed as a step toward salvation, not a sin.

Scholars of Gnosticism debate how Hypostasis engages with Christianity. The text prophesies about the coming "True Man", generally interpreted as Jesus, and the text both quotes and praises Paul. However, there is no consensus on whether these are minor glosses on originally non-Christian material or core features of the text. Scholars have also analyzed the work's perspectives on gender. The core figures in its narrative are female, while its antagonists are male, and the archons attempt to rape both Norea and Eve.

== Background ==
Hypostasis of the Archons is a Sethian Gnostic text. The Gnostics held a negative view of the material world, which they believed was made by a flawed creator inferior to the ultimate God, and professed a soteriology of salvation through knowledge. To attain this knowledge, Gnostic exegesis emphasized finding hidden, esoteric meanings within sacred texts, especially the early chapters of Genesis, which Christians generally read as a history of Adam's original sin. Sethian Gnostics considered themselves descendants of Seth, the third son of Adam and Eve. Their religious texts often involved Seth revealing knowledge for his descendants' salvation, sometimes conflating him with Jesus. However, unlike most Sethian texts, Hypostasis only briefly mentions Seth himself, focusing instead on his sister Norea.

== Summary ==
The archons see a divine image reflected in water. They attempt to grasp the reflected image, but are unable to hold it. Instead, they decide to create humanity in its shape. They create a man out of earth, but are unable to make him stand. The divine feminine spirit (ⲡⲛⲉⲩⲙⲁ) descends from heaven and enters the man, bringing him to life and naming him Adam.

The archons open Adam's side to remove the spirit, then try to rape her. She avoids them by transforming into a tree, leaving behind a shadow named Eve. The spirit then enters a serpent, through which she tells Adam and Eve to eat fruit from the tree of the knowledge of good and evil. She insists that, contrary to the archons' warnings, Adam and Eve will not die upon eating from it. Adam and Eve eat the tree's fruit, realize they are spiritually naked, and cover their genitals. In response, the archons exile them from the Garden of Eden and curse humanity to a life of work and suffering. Eve gives birth to Cain and Abel, while Adam's "co-image" (ϢⲂⲢⲈⲒⲚⲈ) gives birth to Seth and Norea.

As humanity multiplies, the archons decide to flood the world. The heavenly figure Sabaoth tells Noah to build an ark, which Norea asks to board; when Noah refuses to let her on the ark, she burns it. The archons attempt to rape Norea, but she asks for help and is rescued by Eleleth, a divine luminary. Eleleth rhetorically asks whether the archons have power over her, and promises she will not be defiled. Norea asks how the archons came to exist.

Eleleth explains that Sophia tried to procreate without her male counterpart, which produced the "abortion" Yaldabaoth. Yaldabaoth arrogantly claimed to be the only god, and thus earned the derogatory name Samael, meaning "God of the Blind". Sophia responded by introducing light into the world, while her daughter Zoe rebuked Yaldabaoth and banished him to Tartarus. After seeing his father's punishment, Yaldabaoth's son Sabaoth repented; Sophia and Zoe rewarded his repentance by placing him in charge of the seventh heaven. Following these events, Yaldabaoth began to envy Sabaoth. His envy created Death, who in turn begat the archons.

Eleleth tells Norea that, unlike the archons, she comes from the heavenly light above. Eleleth prophesies that the seed inside her will be revealed after three generations, and that a figure called the True Man will eventually reveal further knowledge, overthrow the archons, and offer Seth's descendants eternal life. The text ends with the trisagion: "Holy Holy Holy, Amen".

== Manuscript and composition ==
There is only one known copy of Hypostasis of the Archons, although it is well preserved. This copy is in Codex II of the Nag Hammadi library, where it appears alongside the Apocryphon of John, the Gospel of Thomas, the Gospel of Philip, On the Origin of the World, the Exegesis on the Soul, and the Book of Thomas the Contender. This codex was likely compiled by followers of Valentinus. The codex is written in the Sahidic and Subachmimic dialects of Coptic, possibly by a speaker of Subachmimic trying to write Sahidic. This Coptic text is a translation of a now-lost Greek original.

The Nag Hammadi manuscript itself was written around 400 CE. Scholars disagree on the date of the original text. Bentley Layton dates it to the third century CE, based on its philosophical Platonism and the history of mythological developments the text reflects. Gilhus agrees that the text is likely later than many other Gnostic texts, as the Norea story presupposes a developed mythology around Seth. Lewis believes the text was written in the late second century in either Alexandria or Syria. Turner proposes that it was written in 185-200 CE and based on an earlier Jewish version from 100-125 CE. Van den Broek agrees that the combined work could have been written in the second century. Francis Fallon believes the Sabaoth material in particular is likely from the middle of the second century.

Hypostasis is a compilation of at least two sources. The first is a Gnostic interpretation of the first six chapters of Genesis, presented as a third-person narrative. The second is a revelation dialog or apocalypse, sometimes called the "apocalypse of Norea". This revelation dialog may have been used as a catechism. These sources were likely edited together by a Christian Gnostic and introduced with Christian elements, intended for an audience familiar with both the Old and New Testament. The text contains four interjections asserting that the events were willed by the Father above. These may have been additions by the Christian editor, who attempted to make a polytheistic text more monotheist.

The transition between these sources is marked by a change from third- to first-person narration, which Bullard calls "startling". Roel van den Broek also believes the compilation was "not entirely successful". However, Bentley Layton notes that incorporating first-person narration into a third-person text was a popular literary technique at the time, and the editor could have easily rewritten the text to avoid this, suggesting it is not merely an editing artifact. In its final form, the story begins in medias res; the reader only learns the story's background from Eleleth. The revealed background is not exhaustive; it omits many details of Yaldabaoth's creation and fall. This was a common literary technique in Gnostic writings, and implied the authors were not sharing the full extent of their knowledge. Anne McGuire notes that this structure places Norea's struggle in a broader context, and allows the second half to resolve themes that were previously established in the first half. Ingvild Gilhus suggests the two parts represent two distinct stages of gnosis.

The final text contains narrative incongruities. Yaldabaoth appears to help create humanity after he is imprisoned in Tartarus. Norea is portrayed as a contemporary of both Seth and Noah, although Genesis says the two men were born centuries apart. Norea tells the archons she is from the world above, then later seems to learn this from Eleleth. These incongruities may represent places where additional sources were incorporated.

Hypostasis of the Archons has many similarities with On the Origin of the World, which appears in the same codex. They are the only two surviving texts which describe Sabaoth repenting and receiving a heavenly throne. Scholars do not agree on the cause of these similarities. The two works may be independent redactions of a single common text or separate compilations of the same sources. Origin may also be a later redaction of Hypostasis.

=== Title ===
The Coptic title, ⲧⲑⲩⲡⲟⲥⲧⲁⲥⲓⲥ ⲛ̄ⲛ̄ⲁⲣⲭⲱⲛ, transliterates the Greek words hypostasis (ὑπόστασις) and archon (ἄρχων). Archon was a Greek word for a political ruler. The text refers to both "archons" and "powers" (έξουσία), although it's unclear whether these terms are interchangeable.

The Greek word hypostasis is used four times in the text, where it is describes both current reality and the process of becoming real. Prior to the text's publication, Stoics had used the word to mean "becoming". Translators have interpreted hypostasis in diverse ways, including reification (emphasizing that archons have become real), "reality" (emphasizing that the archons are not fictional), "continuing reality" (emphasizing that the Archons are an ongoing concern), "origin" (emphasizing the story of the archons' creation), and analogous to Aristotle's formal cause. These interpretations have led to different English translations of the title, such as The Reality of the Rulers.

== Influences ==
=== Egyptian ===
The imagery of Zoe breathing a fiery angel and sending Yaldabaoth to Tartarus may have been inspired by coffin texts of Ancient Egypt, such as Spell 575 and 937. The language Norea uses when speaking to the archons also recalls magic spells from Egyptian sources. Adam's words to Eve are reminiscent of aretologies around Isis. The archons have animal heads, similar to Ancient Egyptian deities.

=== Jewish ===
In addition to the Book of Genesis, Hypostasis draws heavily from Enoch traditions, particularly the Book of Enoch. According to 1 Enoch, the Great Flood was a response to the Sons of God having sex with human women and defiling humanity. Hypostasis builds on this tradition in its central motif of archons attempting to rape Norea and Eve. Hypostasis prophesies the downfall of the archons using language that recalls 1 Enoch 12:6, and its description of a flaming angel banishing Yaldabaoth to Tartaros mirrors similar imagery in 1 Enoch.

The identification of Cain as the son of the archons may have been inspired by Jewish midrashic traditions which considered him the son of Eve and Satan. These traditions are recorded in sources such as the later Targum Pseudo-Jonathan.

Hypostasis of the Archons draws heavily on Jewish traditions and scripture, but often challenges or subverts them. Its retelling "characteristically 'inverts' the meaning of Genesis." Norea is not named in Genesis, but Birger A. Pearson identifies her as a reinterpretation of Naamah, noting that "her role as a seductress of the 'sons of God' has, in fact, been transposed in the gnostic literature, in a typically gnostic hermeneutical inversion". Samael takes the role of God, and his proclamation of divinity directly quotes Isaiah 45:6. Hypostasis rebukes this proclamation, and by extension rebukes Isaiah's view of God.

These re-interpretations may be interpreted as anti-Jewish. John Turner argues that Hypostasis reflects an early version of Sethian Gnosticism rooted in "a disaffected and heterodox Judaism." Roger Bullard agrees that these inversions "[do] not necessarily give the document any anti-Jewish animus, however, in spite of Isaiah 46:9 being quoted as a self-proclamation of the jealous and inferior God of the Old Testament. Jews in some heterodox tradition, such as that handed down from the community at Elephantine, could even have had a hand in the formation of this tradition, and probably did."

Roel van den Broek interprets Sabaoth's repentance and elevation to heaven "an attempt to make the gnostic interpretation of the Jewish Bible more acceptable for Jews." Ross Kraemer argues that Hypostasis closely parallels the "unambiguously Jewish" text Joseph and Aseneth.

=== Greco-Roman ===
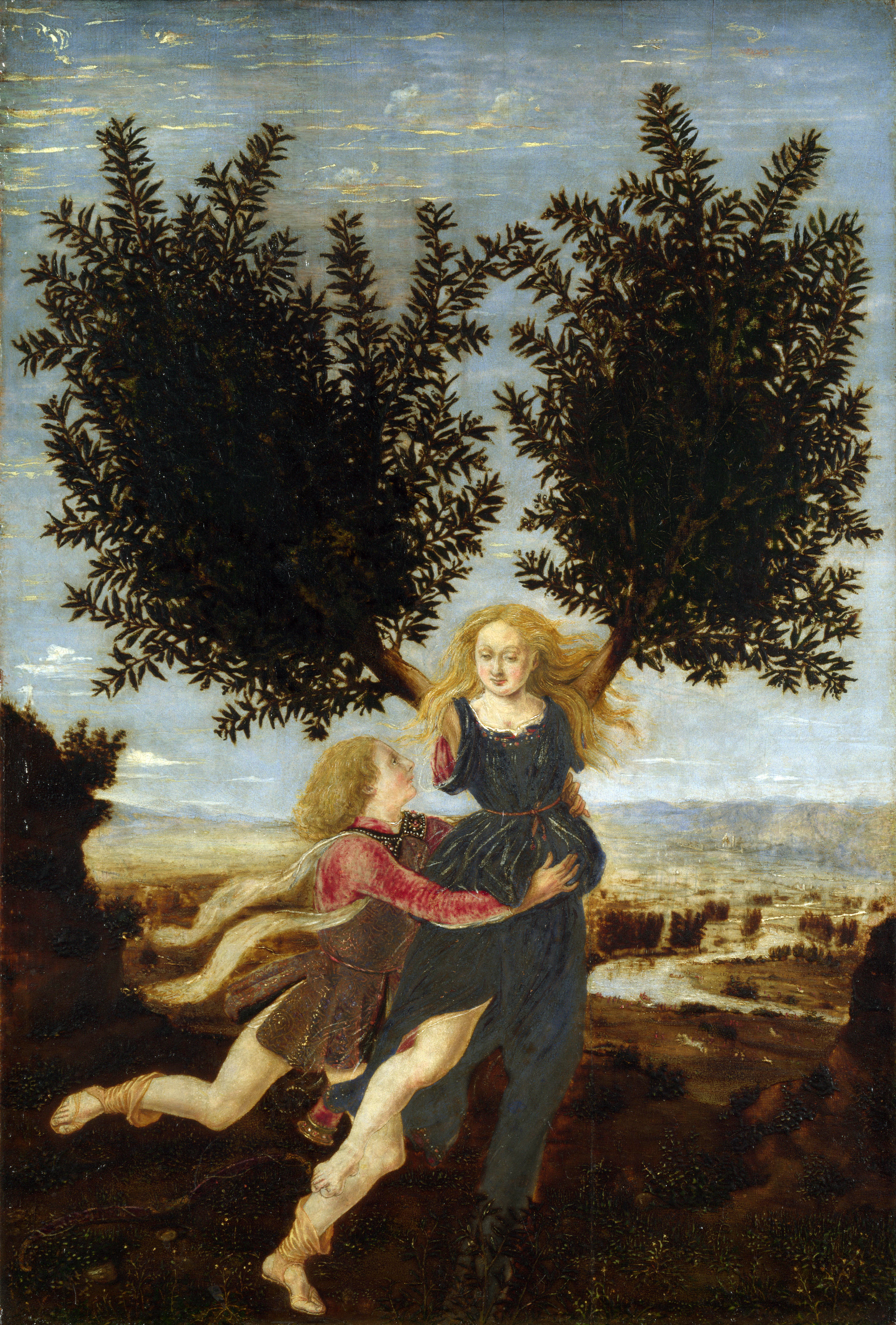
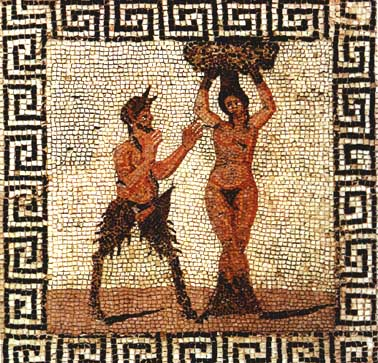
In Hypostasis of the Archons, Eve avoids the archons' lust by becoming a tree. In Greek myth, Daphne became a tree to avoid the lustful Apollo (left), and Pan lusted after tree nymphs called hamadryads (right).

Hypostasis of the Archons reflects a Platonic worldview. The spiritual Eve leaves behind a shadow of flesh, reflecting the Platonic belief that material substances are shadows of eternal Forms. The story adapts the Demiurge myth from Plato's Timaeus, re-contextualizing it to explain parts of Genesis. Eleleth also describes Norea as having a root in the world above, echoing a metaphor from Timaeus. Adam is implied to have been created as a hermaphrodite, and the spiritual Eve is called his "co-image" (ϢⲂⲢⲈⲒⲚⲈ). This may echo the creation myth in the Symposium, in which humans are incomplete halves of doubled entities which were previously combined. The description of Yaldabaoth as lion-headed may allude to Plato's Republic, which describes one aspect of the passionate soul as leonine.

Gilhus observes that Norea's questions about the archons follow the four causes of Aristotle. Aristotle's Generation of Animals linked miscarriages to both androgyny and monstrosity, which are characteristics of both Yaldabaoth—who is described as an abortion—and the archons.

Eve's transformation into a tree recalls the Greek myth of Daphne, and Pan's attraction to hamadryads. The sexual aggression of the archons may reflect similar stories about Zeus. Lewis connects the archons' rape of the sarkic Eve with the mythical Rape of the Sabine Women; the Sabine myth explained the origin of the Romans, while the Eve myth explains the origin of the race of Cain.

== Reinterpretation of Genesis ==
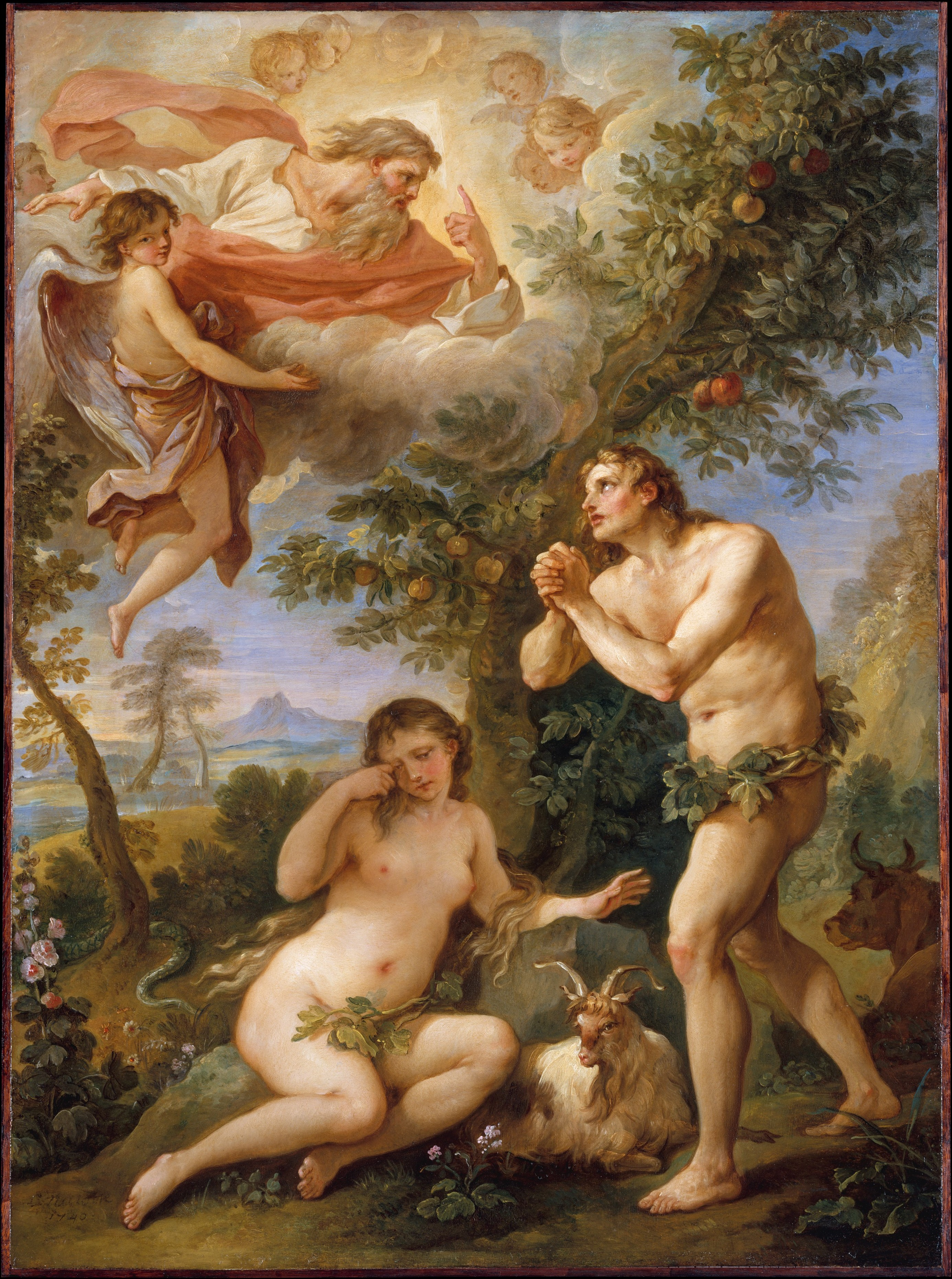
Hypostasis of the Archons retells the Genesis story of Adam and Eve, but inverts its message. Disobeying the archons and eating from the tree of knowledge benefits humans rather than damning them.

Hypostasis of the Archons retells the opening chapters of Genesis, although it changes the chronology of Adam naming the animals and does not mention the creation of the world or Cain's children. It does not directly quote the Book of Genesis, but it mimics the writing style of the Septuagint.

Hypostasis is an exegesis which adds new context to the original story. It explains the darkness in Genesis 1:2 as a shadow cast by the creation in Genesis 1:1. The spirit of God moving over water is reinterpreted as Sophia looking down on water, and the creation of light becomes Sophia's response to Yaldabaoth's arrogance. Eve's creation from Adam's rib is rewritten as the Spirit being recovered from Adam's side. Yaldabaoth's seven sons recall the seven days of creation; in particular, Sabaoth's throne in the seventh heaven reinterprets God's rest on the seventh day. The Spirit's roles reflect a series of puns on Eve's Aramaic name Ḥawwāh. She is referred to as a midwife (ḥayy'ṯā), the tree of life (ḥayyayyā), the snake (ḥew'yā), and an instructor (ḥāwē). Adam's name is also reinterpreted as a pun on "adamantine Earth".

Bentley Layton calls Hypostasis "a radical inversion of the moral values of the Old Testament". In contrast to Genesis, the creators of humanity are portrayed as flawed and ignorant, the highest god wants humans to eat from the tree of knowledge, and the results of eating from the tree are beneficial. Knowledge is associated with salvation, not damnation, and the flood is a reaction to humans improving, not degrading.

God's role in Genesis is split between four figures: Yaldabaoth, Sabaoth, Sophia, and Zoe.

=== Yaldabaoth ===
Yaldabaoth, also called Samael (from the Aramaic for blind) and Saklas (Aramaic for fool), is a mocking caricature of the Old Testament God. As an "abortion", he is composed of formless matter. The text describes him as androgynous, blind, and leonine. He boasts that he is the only god, using the language of Isaiah 45:6, but this claim is portrayed as arrogant and blasphemous. The text emphasizes that his claim is not an honest mistake; he repeats it even after Sophia reveals her light. He is presented as violating the Ten Commandments; he commits adultery by coveting Eve, lies to humans, and dishonors his mother by claiming his superiority. The name Samael was also a name for Satan in Judaism, and Yaldabaoth combines elements of both God and Satan. His punishment in Tartarus mirrors the binding of Satan described in Revelation 20:2-3.

=== Sabaoth ===
Sabaoth (Hebrew for "armies" or "powers") was one of the traditional names of God in Judaism. According to Hypostasis, Sabaoth is the God of the Jews and the source of the Jewish law. Sabaoth is strict, but not evil; he is portrayed much more positively than his father Yaldabaoth. This is a more favorable view of the God of the Old Testament than is found in other Gnostic sources. It may have been an attempt to appeal to Jewish readers and demonstrate that Jews, like Sabaoth himself, can be saved.

In Genesis, God creates the great flood and saves Noah. In Hypostasis, these roles are split: Yaldabaoth orders the flood, while Sabaoth tells Noah to build the ark. (Note: Ingvild Gilhus disagrees with this analysis. In her reading of the text, Yaldabaoth tells Noah to build the ark, not Sabaoth.) In this retelling, Noah represents Jews and non-Gnostic Christians. Sabaoth opposes the evil Yaldabaoth, but he and Noah do not recognize the Gnostic salvation offered by Norea. Although Sabaoth is enthroned in heaven, he is still ultimately below the cosmic veil and Gnostics are not subject to his rule.

=== Sophia ===
Unlike in other Gnostic texts, Sophia is not presented as a fallen deity. Instead, she remains a heavenly figure above the cosmic veil. Although Sophia is likely the voice that rebukes Yaldabaoth's blasphemy, her daughter Zoe is the one to punish him. Sophia is not presented as responsible for Yaldabaoth's actions or the material world, and does not need to repent or be redeemed.

== Themes and analysis ==
=== Soteriology ===
According to the text, the True Man will reveal the highest gnosis, but only to Norea's children. It is not clear whether this means salvation is predetermined. Gilhus interprets the text's soteriology as saying that readers may choose whether to become descendants of Norea, or that Norea's children are automatically saved while the children of Cain must actively choose salvation. She notes that Sabaoth is saved despite being the son of Yaldabaoth, which implies that salvation is not dictated by genetics. Gerard Luttikhuizen interprets the story of Noah as another parable of salvation: like Noah, the descendants of Seth may choose whether or not to accept the gnostic salvation offered by Norea.

=== Cosmology ===
Unlike other Gnostic texts, Hypostasis does not focus on the structure of the world above. Instead, the text focuses on the creation and history of the material world. Eleleth describes the material and heavenly worlds as being separated by a veil. Yaldabaoth and the archons are made out of matter, which is formed from the shadows cast by this veil.

Sabaoth's seven offspring represent the seven planets according to Ptolemy: the Sun, the Moon, Mercury, Venus, Mars, Jupiter, and Saturn. Eleleth is identified as a Luminary, which was a generic term for celestial objects that included both the Ptolemaic "planets" and the stars.

=== Gender ===
Unlike most Greco-Roman traditions, Gnostic texts like Hypostasis present the divine as primarily feminine, not masculine or androgynous. Many of the text's revealer figures, including Sophia, Eve, Norea, and Zoe, are female. Seth himself barely appears in the Hypostasis. He is only identified as a son of Adam and Eve, not a heavenly figure. Instead, far more attention is given to his sister Norea, whom Birger Pearson identifies as Seth's "feminine counterpart". Eve in particular represents three feminine roles: mother, daughter, and wife. She grants Adam life, emerges from his side, and later becomes his companion. In contrast, Death is personified as male. The archons are also presented as either androgynous or male, and their power is specifically masculine, as they attempt to rape both Norea and Eve. Eleleth and the True Man are exceptions to this pattern as male figures of enlightenment.

== Relationship to Christianity ==
The author of Hypostasis of the Archons approvingly quotes Ephesians and refers to Paul as "the great apostle". Although Jesus is not mentioned explicitly, Eleleth's description of the True Man is "distinctly Johannine" and likely refers to him.

It's unclear whether these elements reflect a substantial Christian influence. Charles Hedrick considers them an "extremely thin veneer of Christianizing" by a later editor. Roel van den Broek argues that the Ephesians quotation is merely "an introductory remark by the text’s last redactor," and Roger Bullard considers the allusion to Jesus out of place, noting that "at no other point in this section is there any reference to the eschatological or prophetic implications of the events narrated".

In contrast, Elaine Pagels argues for a more fundamental Christian influence, believing that the references to Paul signal "the author's intent to read Genesis through Paul's eyes (and not, as others have suggested, a superficial attempt to christianize other sources, or glosses tacked onto non-Christian material by a hypothetical redactor). Following this opening, the Hypostasis of the Archons proceeds to tell the 'story behind the story' of creation, using as its basis 1 Corinthians 15".

== Sources ==
- Brakke, David (2010). The Gnostics: Myth, Ritual, and Diversity in Early Christianity. Cambridge (Mass.): Harvard University Press. ISBN 978-0-674-04684-9.
- Bull, Christian H. (2017). "Women, Angels, and Dangerous Knowledge: The Myth of the Watchers in the Apocryphon of John and Its Monastic Manuscript-Context". In Tervahauta, Ulla; Miroshnikov, Ivan; Lehtipuu, Outi; Dunderberg, Ismo (eds.). Women and Knowledge in Early Christianity. Leiden, The Netherlands: Brill. ISBN 978-90-04-35543-9.
- Bullard, Roger (1970). The Hypostasis of the Archons: The Coptic Text with Translation and Commentary. Berlin: Walter De Gruyter & Co.
- Fallon, Francis T. (1978). The Enthronement of Sabaoth: Jewish Elements in Gnostic Creation Myths. Leiden, The Netherlands: Brill. ISBN 90-04-05683-1.
- Fischer-Mueller, E. Aydeet (1990). "Yaldabaoth: The Gnostic Female Principle in Its Fallenness". Novum Testamentum. 32 (1): 79–95. doi:10.2307/1560677. ISSN 0048-1009.
- Gilhus, Ingvild Sælid (1985). The Nature of the Archons: A Study In The Soteriology Of A Gnostic Treatise From Nag Hammadi. Wiesbaden: Harrassowitz. ISBN 9783447025188.
- Gruenwald, Ithamar (1973). "Jewish Sources for the Gnostic Texts from Nag Hammadi?". Proceedings of the World Congress of Jewish Studies. III: 45–56. ISSN 0333-9068.
- Halvgaard, Tilde Bak (2017). "Life, Knowledge and Language in Classic Gnostic Literature: Reconsidering the Role of the Female Spiritual Principle and Epinoia". In Tervahauta, Ulla; Miroshnikov, Ivan; Lehtipuu, Outi; Dunderberg, Ismo (eds.). Women and Knowledge in Early Christianity. Leiden, The Netherlands: Brill. ISBN 978-90-04-35543-9.
- Kraemer, Ross S. (2000). "A Response to Virginity and Subversion". In King, Karen (ed.). Images of the Feminine in Gnosticism. Harrisburg, Pa: Trinity Press International. ISBN 1-56338-331-4.
- Layton, Bentley, ed. (1989). Nag Hammadi Codex II, 2-7. Leiden, The Netherlands: Brill. ISBN 90-04-09019-3.
- Layton, Bentley (1974). ""The Hypostasis of the Archons, or 'The Reality of the Rulers.'"". The Harvard Theological Review. 67 (4): 351–425. JSTOR 1509048.
- Layton, Bentley (1976). "The Hypostasis of the Archons (Conclusion)". The Harvard Theological Review. 69 (1/2): 31–101. ISSN 0017-8160. JSTOR 1509235.
- Lewis, Nicola Denzey (2013). Introduction to "Gnosticism": Ancient Voices, Christian Worlds. Oxford: Oxford University Press. ISBN 9780199755318.
- Luttikhuizen, Gerard P. (2006). Gnostic Revisions of Genesis Stories and Early Jesus Traditions. Leiden, The Netherlands: Brill. ISBN 90-04-14510-9.
- McGuire, Anne (2000). "Virginity and Subversion: Norea Against the Powers in the Hypostasis of the Archons". In King, Karen (ed.). Images of the Feminine in Gnosticism. Harrisburg, Pa: Trinity Press International. ISBN 1-56338-331-4.
- Pagels, Elaine (1986). "Exegesis And Exposition Of The Genesis Creation Accounts In Selected Texts From Nag Hammadi". In Hedrick, Charles; Hodgson, Robert (eds.). Nag Hammadi, Gnosticism, & Early Christianity. Peabody, Mass: Hendrickson Publishers. ISBN 0-913573-16-7.
- Pagels, Elaine (2000a). "Adam and Eve and the Serpent in Genesis 1— 3". In King, Karen (ed.). Images of the Feminine in Gnosticism. Harrisburg, Pa: Trinity Press International. ISBN 1-56338-331-4.
- Pagels, Elaine (2000b). "Pursuing the Spiritual Eve: Imagery and Hermeneutics in the Hypostasis of the Archons and the Gospel of Philip". In King, Karen (ed.). Images of the Feminine in Gnosticism. Harrisburg, Pa: Trinity Press International. ISBN 1-56338-331-4.
- Pearson, Birger (1988). "Revisiting Norea". In King, Karen (ed.). Images of the Feminine in Gnosticism (1st Trinity Press International ed.). Harrisburg: Trinity Press International. p. 273.
- Pearson, Birger A. (1990). Gnosticism, Judaism and Egyptian Christianity. Minneapolis: Fortress Press. ISBN 0-8006-3104-8.
- Pearson, Birger (2000). "Revisiting Norea". In King, Karen (ed.). Images of the Feminine in Gnosticism. Harrisburg, Pa: Trinity Press International. ISBN 1-56338-331-4.
- Scopello, Madeleine (2000a). "Jewish and Greek Heroines in the Nag Hammadi Library". In King, Karen (ed.). Images of the Feminine in Gnosticism. Harrisburg, Pa: Trinity Press International. ISBN 1-56338-331-4.
- Scopello, Madeleine (2000b). "Sophia as Goddess in the Nag Hammadi Codices". In King, Karen (ed.). Images of the Feminine in Gnosticism. Harrisburg, Pa: Trinity Press International. ISBN 1-56338-331-4.
- Stroumsa, Gedaliahu A. G. (1984). Another Seed: Studies in Gnostic Mythology. Leiden, The Netherlands: Brill. ISBN 9789004074194.
- Thomassen, Einar (2019). "There is No Such Thing as Gnosticism: But Have We Got Instead?". In Crégheur, Éric; Painchaud, Louis; Rasimus, Tuomas (eds.). Nag Hammadi at 70: What Have We Learned?. Leuven: Peeters. ISBN 978-90-429-3630-0.
- Turner, John (2001). Sethian Gnosticism and the Platonic Tradition. Quebec: Les Presses de l'Universite Laval.
- van den Broek, Roelof (2013). Gnostic Religion in Antiquity. Cambridge: Cambridge University Press. ISBN 9781139620413.
