= Second Treatise of the Great Seth =

Apocryphal Gnostic Christian text

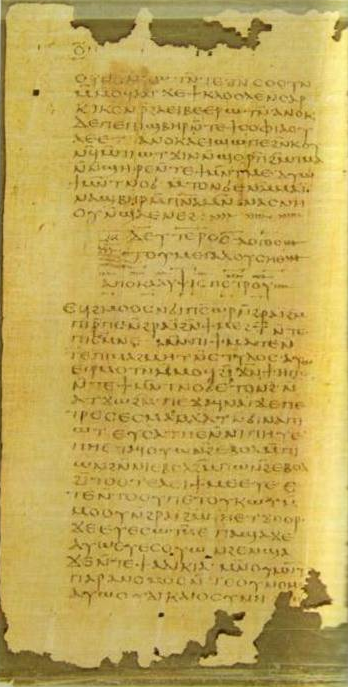
Codex VII of the Nag Hammadi library, page 70, which has the end of the Second Treatise and the start of the Gnostic Apocalypse of Peter. The title is only seen here at the end of the work, not the beginning, and is in Greek, while the rest of the work is in Coptic.

The Second Treatise of the Great Seth, (Note: Ancient Greek: Δεύτερος λόγος τοῦ Μεγάλου Σήθ, romanized: Deuteros logos toû megàlou sēth) also known as the Second Discourse of the Great Seth and Second Logos of the Great Seth, is a Gnostic text. It is the second tractate in Codex VII of the Nag Hammadi library. It was likely originally written in the Koine Greek language and composed around 200 CE. The surviving manuscript from Nag Hammadi is a translation of the Greek into Coptic. The work's author is unknown; he was perhaps writing in Alexandria, the literary center of Egyptian Christianity.

The work is a speech given by Jesus, perhaps intended as a homily to rally Gnostic Christians with against opposition from proto-orthodox Christians. It repeatedly denigrates opponents, both material and spiritual, as "jokes" whose bluster hides their weakness. Despite the title, the word "Seth" never appears in the text, nor is a separate work called the First Discourse of Seth extant. The title might refer to Sethian beliefs that the first incarnation of the Great Seth was the son of Adam and Eve, while the second manifestation of Great Seth was Jesus himself.

A variety of Gnostic themes and doctrines are propounded: souls are preexisting and immortal, but the mortal bodies they are attached to have forgotten their noble origin; the false God Yaldabaoth is an inferior being, and those who serve him are deluded fools and laughingstocks; and Jesus's teachings (gnosis and sophia) can enable souls to cast off their earthly shackles and achieve spiritual enlightenment. Like the Gnostic Apocalypse of Peter, the text takes a docetic view of the crucifixion of Jesus: that Jesus did not die in reality, but only in appearance. The Passion of Jesus is treated as a joke, with the invulnerable, divine, spiritual Jesus laughing at those who thought they could kill him, but only succeeded in killing "their man", the unimportant physical side of Jesus.

== Contents ==
The text is written from the perspective of Jesus. In it, Jesus reflects on the nature of reality and the existence of a perfect deity, who is at rest in the truth and ineffable light. He speaks about the word of the deity, the thought of the imperishable spirit, and the idea of dying with Christ. He visits a bodily dwelling and reveals himself to be a stranger from above the heavens, causing the rulers of the earthly area to become troubled. Some are persuaded by the wonders he accomplishes, while others flee and bring punishment upon him. The rulers are unable to recognize the true father of truth and the human of greatness, but instead, they take the name out of ignorance. Jesus died because of those who offered praise, but not really, because the archangel was vacuous.

Jesus describes the voice of the world ruler who claims to be the only god, causing Jesus to laugh. He has a single emanation from the eternal and unknowable ones, places a small thought in the world, and visits the angels with fire and flame, causing a disturbance and a fight around the seraphim and cherubim. Jesus says that he did not die in reality but in appearance, and the ignorant ones who punished him condemned themselves. He assumed different shapes and passed by the gates of the angels without being seen, mingled with them, and tramped on those who were harsh. He brought the son of the majesty to the height and revealed the three ways to a perfect bridal chamber of the heavens. His cross was rejected by the world, and after they nailed him to the cross, darkness overtook the world. The veil of the temple was torn, and the souls that were in the sleep below were released.

Jesus criticizes the rulers for not understanding the truth about the ineffable union between the children of light and for instead promoting a doctrine of fear, slavery, and worldly worship. He contrasts the rulers with those who have nothing but desire the truth, and those who live in harmony and love, which is the universal and perfect love. Jesus also speaks of Adam, Abraham, Isaac, Jacob, David, Solomon, the twelve prophets, and Moses, who were all made to be a laughingstock by the realm of seven, and that they never truly knew Jesus or his brothers. The ruler is also criticized for claiming to be god and bringing sin upon generations, but Jesus and his brothers are innocent and have overcome the ruler's false teachings. Jesus addresses those who do not see their blindness, having never known the truth or listened to a reliable report, leading them to a judgment of error.

In the conclusion, Jesus describes himself as the despised human son. The text emphasizes the importance of unity among Gnostics and the avoidance of negative qualities such as jealousy, division, anger, and fear. Jesus is depicted as a mystery who, along with others, was spiritually married in union before the foundation of the world. The text also mentions that the rulers around Yaldabaoth were disobedient due to their envy, but Jesus is a friend of Sophia and is a member of the children of truth and greatness. The ending encourages the readers to rest with Jesus, his fellow spirits, and his brothers and sisters, forever.

== Authorship, date, and manuscript ==
The author of the original Greek text is unknown, but he is speculated to have written at some point from the late second century to the early third century (c. 150–230 CE), and most likely in Roman Egypt. The city of Alexandria is a reasonable guess as to the site of composition, largely on grounds that it was a wealthy and prosperous city that was a hub of literary activity. The text was probably a unity composed by one author, rather than a composite work created by a later editor. The surviving manuscript from Nag Hammadi is a translation of the Greek into Coptic; while the translation is adequate, there remain many confusing and ambiguous passages, with it unclear whether the original Greek was similarly opaque. The manuscript is in excellent condition as far as reading the text. The work is the second in Codex VII, following the Paraphrase of Shem, and is itself followed by the Gnostic Apocalypse of Peter.

The Nag Hammadi library was discovered in 1945, but due to a variety of reasons, it was not until 1972 that a reproduction of Codex VII was published and available to the public. The manuscript is held in the Coptic Museum in Old Cairo. The section of Codex VII with the Second Treatise is 21 pages long, from page 49 to page 70. As there is only a single manuscript extant, citations to passages are done via page number and line number.

== Analysis ==
=== Sethianism ===
I [Jesus] approached a bodily dwelling and evicted the previous occupant, and I went in.

— Second Treatise of the Great Seth 51, 20

Gnosticism was a broad movement containing many different strands, although it remains poorly understood due to the rarity of surviving documents from the Gnostic perspective, with the Nag Hammadi library being the main guide. One variety classified by scholars is Sethianism, seen in works such as the Apocryphon of John. An idea in Sethianism is that of emanations over the aeons (ages). While the Second Treatise of the Great Seth is not very explicit on what is going on, the best guess is that the title is implying that both Seth and Jesus were emanations of the same powerful immortal soul, sent to the mortal world to dispense wisdom (sophia). The immortal spiritual Jesus is who mattered in this view, not the unimportant physical body it possessed during its time in the mortal realm.

While the Gospel of Matthew was the most popular gospel in Egypt by far, the "logos" of the title might refer to the divine logos usually associated with Johannine works, where the preexisting essence of Jesus is associated with the "Word".

=== Yaldabaoth ===
The ruler was a joke, for he said, "I am God, and no one is greater than I. I alone am Father and Lord, and there is no other beside me. I am a jealous god, and I bring the sins of the fathers upon the children for three and four generations" – as though he had become stronger than I [Jesus] and my siblings.

— Second Treatise of the Great Seth 64,17 – 65, 1

The text mocks Yaldabaoth, the evil ruler of the material world, as a joke who has greatly exaggerated his power. However, he has fooled various people into attempting to worship both him and the true God at the same time, with ineffective results. Adam, Abraham, Isaac, Jacob, David, Solomon, the twelve prophets, Moses, and John the Baptist were all jokes, either fooled by Yaladbaoth's bluster or in Adam's case, creations of him.

Interestingly, the text includes a single "good" archon who, unlike the other archons, is welcoming to Jesus's arrival, while the other archons are hostile. This good archon is called Adonaios, presumably taken from the Hebrew adonai, "my lord". This archon might be the same as Sabaoth, seen in other works as a sympathetic archon.

=== Docetism ===
They saw me and punished me, but someone else, their father, drank the gall and the vinegar; it was not I. They were striking me with a scourge, but someone else, Simon, bore the cross on his shoulder. Someone else wore the crown of thorns. And I was on high, poking fun at all the excesses of the rulers and the fruit of their error and conceit. I was laughing at their ignorance.

— Second Treatise of the Great Seth 56,1 – 56,20

Like the Gnostic Apocalypse of Peter, the text takes a docetic view of the crucifixion of Jesus: Jesus "did not die in reality but in appearance." The evil archons, the rulers of the mortal world, attempted to kill Jesus, but failed and only killed his unimportant material side. After the sham crucifixion, Jesus celebrates in heaven at a "wedding of truth" and a "feast of love".

According to the proto-orthodox heresiologist Irenaeus, some Gnostics propounded a substitution hypothesis wherein Simon of Cyrene was crucified instead of Jesus. While the Second Treatise does mention Simon, it does not appear to say Simon was crucified; rather, it seems Jesus was crucified, but only the unimportant mortal body the spiritual Christ had possessed. Gnosticism sought to liberate its followers from the constraints of the mortal body and awaken their immortal souls, so the crucifixion of Jesus's mortal body was not perceived as that problematic.

While the work does not go into great detail, it includes some presumed criticisms of proto-orthodox Christianity's understanding of the Passion. In this view, they have misunderstood what occurred and worship "the doctrine of a dead man," while true salvation is achieved by allowing the spiritual Christ within.

=== Unity of Gnostics and the powerlessness of other Christians ===
You who are perfect and undefiled, I have presented this to you on account of the mystery that is undefiled and perfect and ineffable, that you understand that we ordained these things before the foundation of the world, so that when we appear throughout the world, we may present the symbols of incorruption from the spiritual union with knowledge.

— Second Treatise of the Great Seth 69, 23 – 70,1

The text encourages unity among Gnostics, assuring them that Jesus will help them overcome the false rulers and their followers. Jesus himself has already unified with his faithful followers, presumably Gnostics, and is the "friend of Sophia." Meanwhile, the proto-orthodox are "ignorant and of no significance." If Gnostics live in harmony and harmony and friendship, they demonstrate perfect love and reflect the "will of the Father."
