= Ophite Diagrams =

Esoteric diagrams used by the Ophites

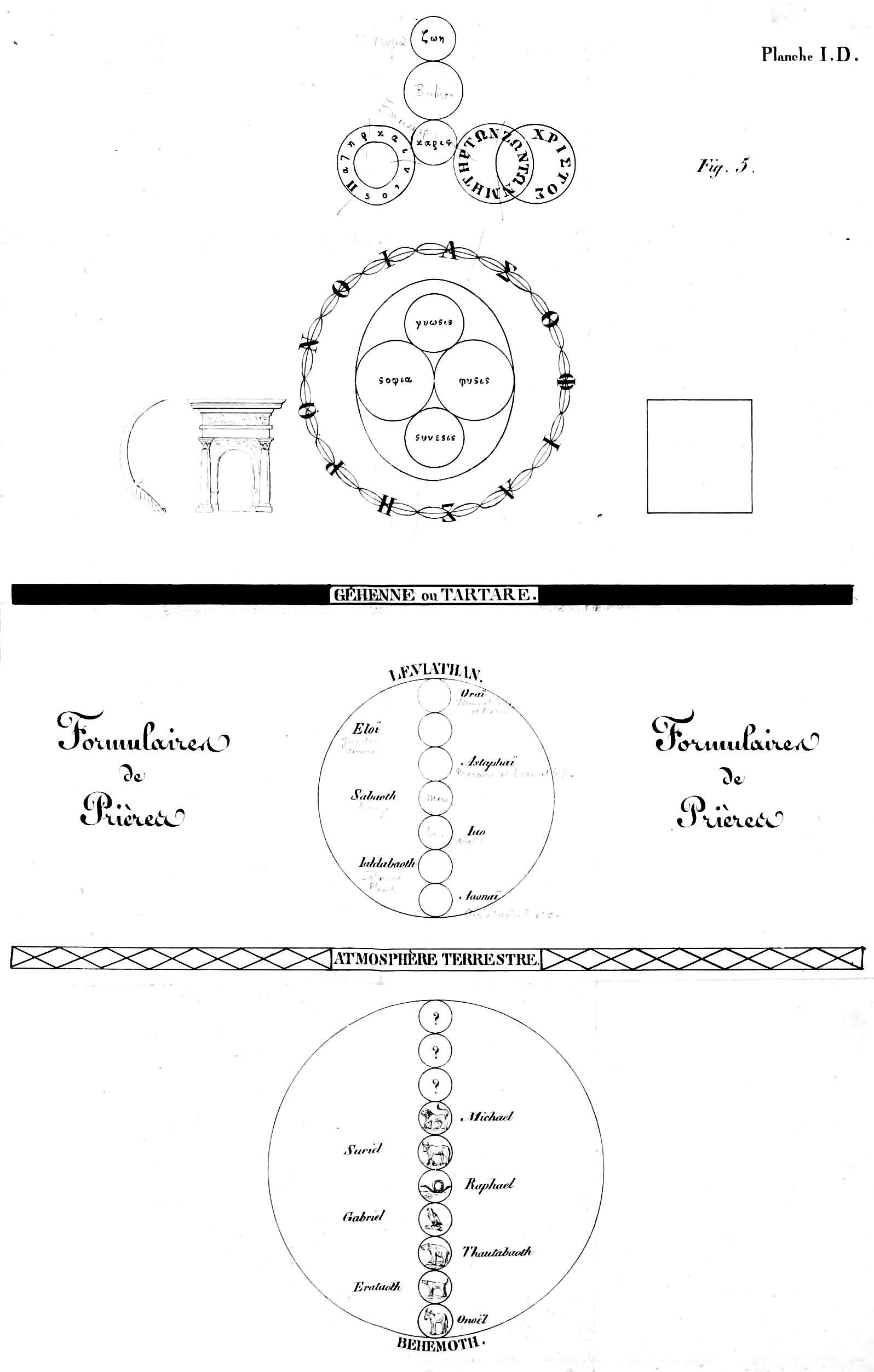
Reconstruction from Histoire critique du Gnosticisme; Jacques Matter, 1826, Vol. III, Plate I, D.

The Ophite Diagrams are ritual and esoteric diagrams used by the Ophite sect of Gnosticism, who revered the serpent from the Garden of Eden as a symbol of wisdom, which the malevolent Demiurge tried to hide from Adam and Eve.

Celsus and his opponent Origen (Contra Celsum, vi. §§ 24-38) both describe the diagrams, though not in the same way. Celsus describes them as ten separate circles, circumscribed by one circle, the world-soul, Leviathan, divided by a thick black line, Tartarus, together with a square, with words said at the gates of Paradise. Further to this, the Ophites are said by Celsus to add the sayings of prophets, and circles upon circles, with some things written within the two great cosmological circles representing God the Father, and God the Son.

Origen maintains that there were two concentric circles, across the diameter of which were inscribed the words ΠΑΤΗΡ ("father") and ΥΙΟϹ ("son"); a smaller circle hung from the larger one, with the words ΑΓΑΠΗ ("love"). A wall divides the realm of light from the middle realm. Two other concentric circles, one light and one dark, represent light and shadow. Hanging from this double circle was a circle with the inscription ΖΩΗ ("life"), and this enclosed two other circles which intersected each other and formed a rhomboid. In the common field were the words ΣΟΦΙΑϹ ΦΥϹΙϹ ("the nature of wisdom"), above ΓΝΩϹΙϹ ("knowledge"), and below ΣΟΦΙΑ ("wisdom"); in the rhomboid was ΣΟΦΙΑϹ ΠΡΟΝΟΙΑ ("the providence of wisdom"). There were altogether seven circles, with the names of seven archons:

- Michael, in the form of a lion
- Sariel, of a bull
- Raphael, of a dragon
- Gabriel, of an eagle
- Thauthabaoth ("Tohu wa-Bohu"), of a bear's head
- Erataoth, of a dog's head
- Onoel or Thartharaoth, of an ass's head

The archons are perhaps identical with the seven generations of Yaldabaoth. They signify the corporeal world, which follows the middle realm, and with which the dominion of Sophia ends. The Sefirot of Jewish Kabbalah may be in some way connected with this diagram (Myer, pp. 311-13). But the serpent as symbol is found likewise in connection with the mysteries of Egypt, Greece, Phoenicia, Syria, and even Babylonia and India.

== Bibliography ==
- Myer, Isaac (1888). Qabbalah: The Philosophical Writings of Solomon ben Yehudah Ibn Gebirol. Philadelphia: Published by the author. p. 311.
- The Ophite Diagrams published by the Gnostic Society Owens, Lance (editor) citing A. H. B. Logan, The Gnostics: Identifying an Early Christian Cult, 2006 & Reconstructing the Ophite Diagram, A. J. Welburn, Novum Testamentum, Vol. 23, Fasc. 3 (Jul., 1981), pp. 261-287

Attribution
