= Second treatise =

The term Second treatise may refer to:

- John Locke's Second Treatise of Government (1689)
- The Second Treatise of the Great Seth, a gnostic text.
