= Sabaoth (Gnosticism) =

Mars

In some Gnostic writings, Sabaoth (/ˈsæbeɪˌɒθ, ˈsæbəˌoʊθ, səˈbeɪˌoʊθ/) is one of the sons of Yaldabaoth. According to Hypostasis of the Archons and On the Origin of the World, Sabaoth dethrones his father Yaldabaoth, Sabaoth repents, when he hears the voice of Sophia, condemns his father and his mother (matter) and after that is enthroned by Sophia in the seventh heaven. Some Church Fathers claimed that Gnostics identified Sabaoth with Yaldabaoth.

== Name ==
The name Sabaoth appears in the Old Testament in reference to an army. In the First Book of Samuel (1, 11), the name is used as a name of God.

== In Gnostic sources ==
Jan Zandee interprets Sabaoth's role as the opposite of Ialdabaoth. The psychics can choose between both; Yaldabaoth representing evil and Sabaoth representing good. Sabaoth becomes the current ruler of the world and thus fulfills the role of the God of Israel.

Thrown into Tartarus, Yaldabaoth envies his son, whereupon his envy takes on shape and becomes death. From death, envy, wrath, weeping, roar, loud shouting, sobbing and grief emerge. Many of these emotions seem to be related to lament during funerals. As mourning was controversial among early Christians, associated with Satan, they might intentionally display disapproval about lamenting the dead and advocated control of emotions. However, this is not explicitly spelled out and some emotions, such as anger for the rulers of darkness, are approved, thus differing from Stoicism.

After Yaldabaoth brought death into the world, Sabaoth creates a host of cherubim, a notion also appearing in Jewish Merkabah mysticism.

== Non-Gnostic sources ==
Epiphanius of Salamis, the bishop of Salamis, Cyprus at the end of the 4th century, reports that Severian Encratites (also associated with Sethians) believed Sabaoth and Yaldabaoth to be one and the same—the God of law—and therefore evil. Celsus, a 2nd-century Greek philosopher, identified Yaldabaoth with Cronus and Sabaoth and Adonai with Zeus. Origen (c. 184 – c. 253) denies the equation.

== See also ==
- Aeon – Class of being in Gnosticism
- Archon – Builders of the physical realm that serve the demiurge
- Demiurge – Creation spirit in some schools of philosophy
- Monad – Adaptation of the Greek philosophical concept
