= Astaphaios =

Planetary alias in gnosticism for Venus

In Sethian Gnosticism, Astaphaios is an archon. In On the Origin of the World, he is one of the three sons of Yaldabaoth, with the other two being Yao and Eloai. In the Apocryphon of John, he is the third of the seven archons.

== Role in Gnostic Cosmology ==
In Sethian cosmology, the archons are rulers of the material realm, created by the demiurge Yaldabaoth as barriers to the soul’s ascent to the divine. Astaphaios, as one of these archons, is described as influencing creation and human experience. He appears in various texts describing the structure and hierarchy of supernatural beings in Gnosticism.

== Texts Mentioning Astaphaios ==
- On the Origin of the World: Astaphaios is named as a son of Yaldabaoth. - Apocryphon of John: He is identified as the third of seven archons.

== See also ==
- Astanphaeus
- Yaldabaoth
- On the Origin of the World
- Apocryphon of John
