= Docetism =

View that Jesus' body was illusory

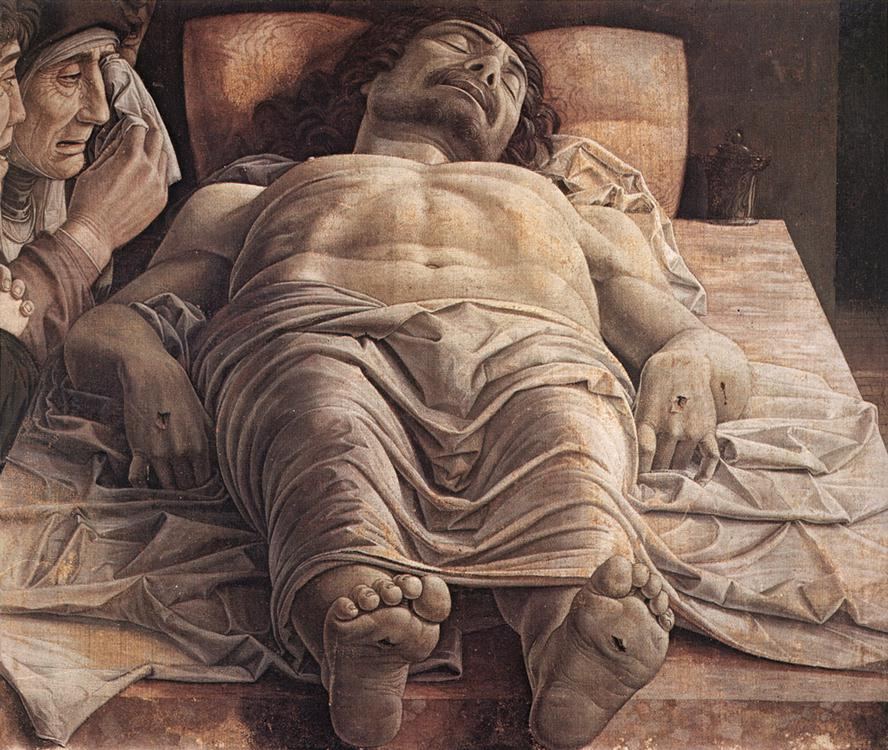
Lamentation of Christ

In the history of Christianity, docetism (from the Koine Greek: δοκεῖν/δόκησις dokeĩn "to seem", dókēsis "apparition, phantom") was the doctrine that the phenomenon of Jesus, his historical and bodily existence, and above all the human form of Jesus, was mere semblance without any true reality. Broadly, it is taken as the belief that Jesus only seemed to be human, and that his human form was an illusion.

== History ==
The word Δοκηταί Dokētaí ("Illusionists") referring to early groups who denied Jesus's humanity, first occurred in a letter by Bishop Serapion of Antioch (197–203), who discovered the doctrine in the Gospel of Peter, during a pastoral visit to a Christian community using it in Rhosus, and later condemned it as a forgery. It appears to have arisen over theological contentions concerning the meaning, figurative or literal, of a sentence from the beginning of the Gospel of John: "the Word was made Flesh".

Docetism was unequivocally rejected at the First Council of Nicaea in 325 and is regarded as heretical by the Catholic Church, Eastern Orthodox Church, Coptic Orthodox Church of Alexandria, Armenian Apostolic Church, Ethiopian Orthodox Tewahedo Church, and Anglican Communion and many Protestant denominations that accept and hold to the statements of these early church councils, such as Calvinist (Reformed Christians), Reformed Baptists, Waldensians, and all Trinitarian Christians.

== Definitions ==
Docetism is broadly defined as the teaching that claims that Jesus's body was either absent or illusory. The term docetic is rather nebulous. Two varieties were widely known. In one version, as in Marcionism, Christ was so divine that he could not have been human, since God lacked a material body, which therefore could not physically suffer. Jesus only appeared to be a flesh-and-blood man; his body was a phantasm. Other groups who were accused of docetism held that Jesus was a man in the flesh, but Christ was a separate entity who entered Jesus's body in the form of a dove at his baptism, empowered him to perform miracles, and abandoned him upon his death on the cross.

== Christology and theological implications ==
Docetism's origin within Christianity is obscure. Ernst Käsemann controversially defined the Christology of the Gospel of John as "naïve docetism" in 1968. The ensuing debate reached an impasse as awareness grew that the very term docetism, like gnosticism, was difficult to define within the religio-historical framework of the debate. It has occasionally been argued that its origins were in heterodox Judaism or Oriental and Grecian philosophies. The alleged connection with Jewish Christianity would have reflected Jewish Christian concerns with the inviolability of (Jewish) monotheism. Docetic opinions seem to have circulated from very early times, 1 John 4:2 appearing explicitly to reject them. Some 1st‑century Christian groups developed docetic interpretations partly as a way to make Christian teachings more acceptable to non-Christian ways of thinking about divinity.

In his critique of the theology of Clement of Alexandria, Photius in his Myriobiblon held that Clement's views reflected a quasi-docetic view of the nature of Christ, writing that "[Clement] hallucinates that the Word was not incarnate but only seems to be." (ὀνειροπολεῖ καὶ μὴ σαρκωθῆναι τὸν λόγον ἀλλὰ δόξαι; oneiropolei kai mē sarkōthēnai ton Logou alla doxai.) In Clement's time, some disputes contended over whether Christ assumed the "psychic" flesh of mankind as heirs to Adam, or the "spiritual" flesh of the resurrection. Docetism largely died out during the first millennium AD.

The opponents against whom Ignatius of Antioch inveighs are often taken to be Monophysite docetists. In his letter to the Smyrnaeans, 7:1, written around 110 AD, he writes:

They abstain from the Eucharist and from prayer, because they confess not the Eucharist to be the flesh of our Saviour Jesus Christ, which suffered for our sins, and which the Father, of his goodness, raised up again. They who deny the gift of God are perishing in their disputes.

While these characteristics fit a Monophysite framework, a slight majority of scholars consider that Ignatius was waging a polemic on two distinct fronts, one Jewish, the other docetic; a minority holds that he was concerned with a group that commingled Judaism and docetism. Others, however, doubt that there was actual docetism threatening the churches, arguing that he was merely criticizing Christians who lived Jewishly or that his critical remarks were directed at an Ebionite or Cerinthian possessionist Christology, according to which Christ was a heavenly spirit that temporarily possessed Jesus.

== Islam and docetism ==
Some commentators have attempted to make a connection between Islam and docetism using the following Quranic verse:

And because of their saying: We slew the Messiah, Jesus son of Mary, Allah's messenger – they slew him not nor crucified him, but it appeared so unto them; and lo! those who disagree concerning it are in doubt thereof; they have no knowledge thereof save pursuit of a conjecture; they slew him not for certain. But Allah took him up unto Himself. Allah was ever Mighty, Wise. ^{[Quran 4:157-158 -Pickthall]}

Some scholars theorise that Islam was influenced by Manichaeism (Docetism) in this regard. However, the general consensus is that Manichaeism was not prevalent in Mecca in the 6th and 7th centuries, when Islam developed, and the influence can therefore not be proven.

== Docetism and Christ myth theory ==
Since Arthur Drews published his The Christ Myth (Die Christusmythe) in 1909, occasional connections have been drawn between docetist theories and the modern idea that Christ was a myth. Shailer Mathews called Drews's theory a "modern docetism". Frederick Cornwallis Conybeare thought any connection to be based on a misunderstanding of docetism. The idea recurred in classicist Michael Grant's 1977 review of the evidence for Jesus, who compared modern scepticism about a historical Jesus to the ancient docetic idea that Jesus only seemed to come into the world "in the flesh". Modern supporters of the theory did away with "seeming".

== Texts believed to include docetism ==
=== Non-canonical Christian texts ===
- Acts of John
- Fundamental Epistle: In Against the Fundamental Epistle, Augustine of Hippo makes reference to his former religion of Manichaeism as believing Jesus was docetic.
- Gnostic Apocalypse of Peter
- Gospel of Basilides
- Gospel of Judas
- Gospel of Peter
- Gospel of Philip
- Second Treatise of the Great Seth

== See also ==
- Adoptionism
- Arianism
- Avatar
- Binitarianism
- Christology
- Eidolon
- Lokottaravāda
- Patripassianism
- Spanish Adoptionism
