= Yurba =

Uthra in Mandaeism

- Other names: Jōrabba
- Affiliation: Shamish, Adonai, Yao
- Abode: World of Light
- Texts: Mandaean Book of John chapter 52

In Mandaeism, Yurba or Yorabba (Classical Mandaic: ࡉࡅࡓࡁࡀ, romanized: Iurba) is an uthra (angelic or celestial being). Lidzbarski (1905, 1920) spells his name as spelt Jōrabba. Yurba, who is also called the fighter, is identified with Shamish, the sun. In Mandaean texts, Yurba is often mentioned as engaging in conversation with Ruha. Gelbert (2013) also suggests that Yurba alludes to the historical Rabbula, a 5th-century bishop of Edessa.

Book 18 of the Right Ginza equates Yurba with Adonai of Judaism, while Gelbert (2017) identifies Yurba with Yao. He is mentioned in Right Ginza 3, 5.3 (which mentions Yurba as a matarta guardian), 8, 12.1, 15.5, and 18 and Left Ginza 2.22 and 3.45. Mandaean Book of John chapter 52 is a narrative dedicated to Yurba.

== Etymology ==
Yurba (Yorbā) is a portmanteau of Yao and Rba (Rabba), which means 'great'.

== Qmaha ḏ-Iurba ==
The Qmaha ḏ-Iurba (Qmaha of Yurba") is an amulet scroll that invokes Yurba for protection. Manuscripts include:

- MS DC 43h, copied by Iahia Bihram br Adam Iuhana in the marshlands in 1272 A.H. (1855-6 A.D.)
- MS DC 18, copied by Sheikh Faraj (Adam br Iahia br Adam Zihrun) for E. S. Drower in Baghdad in 1355 A.H. (1935 A.D.).
- MS CS 27: 8a-10a (undated, probably 19th century)
- MS RRC 1F, copied by Mhatam Iuhana br Ram Zihrun br Sam k. ‘Aziz l. kupašia udurašiẖ in 1286 A.H. (1869-70 A.D.)

== See also ==
- List of angels in theology
