= On the Origin of the World =

Gnostic work dealing with creation and the end time

On the Origin of the World is a Gnostic work dealing with creation and the end time. It was found among the texts in the Nag Hammadi library, in Codex II and Codex XIII, immediately following the Reality of the Rulers. There are many parallels between the two texts. The work is untitled; modern scholars call it “On the Origin of the World” based on its contents. It may have been written in Alexandria near the end of the third century, based on its combination of Jewish, Manichaean, Christian, Greek, and Egyptian ideas. The unknown author's audience appears to be outsiders who are unfamiliar with the Gnostic view of how the world came into being. The contents provide an alternate interpretation of Genesis, in which the dark ruler Yaldabaoth created heaven and earth, and a wise instructor opened the minds of Adam and Eve to the truth when they ate from the Tree of Knowledge.

== Summary ==
The text starts with a critique of the commonly held belief that chaos existed before anything else. Instead, it asserts that something existed before chaos and that chaos was created from a shadow. This shadow was the result of a wish made by the likeness of Sophia, who flowed out of Pistis. The shadow gave birth to the powers of darkness and the ruler Yaldabaoth, who established his rule over matter. Yaldabaoth created heaven and earth, and he created three sons: Yao, Eloai, and Astaphaios.

The Seven Heavens of Chaos are inhabited by androgynous beings. Yaldabaoth creates beautiful heavens for his sons and is praised but later becomes boastful and sins. Pistis Sophia reveals her image and rebukes Yaldabaoth. Sabaoth worships Pistis, receives light, and creates an angelic assembly with Jesus and the Virgin. Pistis separates Sabaoth from darkness, causing the chief creator to become jealous and create death and 49 demons. Zoe creates seven good powers in response. Yaldabaoth sees Pistis' likeness in the water and realizes his mistake. Forethought Sambathas (the feminine name of Yaldabaoth) falls in love with Adam of light, but he hates her because she is in darkness, so she pours her light upon the earth, creating the holy steel-like earth and purifying the water.

The text describes the creation of Eros and Psyche, Paradise, plants and animals, and humans. Eros, an androgynous being, created the gods and their angels and made them fall in love with him. Justice created Paradise with the trees of life and knowledge, and the olive tree was created to purify justice. Psyche loved Eros and poured her blood on him, resulting in the first rose. The authorities created all species of animals and birds, and Sophia created the great luminaries, the stars, and the sky. Adam of light created a great eternal realm with six realms and their worlds.

The archons decide to create a human being to serve them, but Sophia Zoe, with Sabaoth, anticipates them and creates her own human being first. This being, known as the instructor, is born as an androgynous person and is called Eve of life by the Jews. The authorities call the instructor a beast, but Eve is the first virgin who gave birth without a man. Afterward, the cosmic rulers mold Adam with the help of their seed and leave him as a lifeless vessel. However, Sophia Zoe sends her breath into Adam, and he begins to move. The authorities are disturbed and leave Adam in paradise. Sophia sends her daughter Zoe, called Eve, to give Adam life.

The cosmic authorities were informed that Adam was alive. They sent seven archangels to capture Eve, who was speaking with Adam. Eve was able to escape the authorities, but they defiled the likeness of her that remained with Adam. Eve then bore the children of the cosmic powers. The rulers saw Adam and Eve in ignorance and gave them a rule not to eat from the tree of knowledge. A wise instructor came and instructed Eve to eat the fruit of the tree, and she did so, along with Adam. Their minds opened and they saw their nakedness and their beastly makers.

The rulers of darkness enter paradise after discovering that Adam and Eve have broken their commandment. The rulers curse Adam, Eve, the earth and its fruit. They then test Adam's knowledge and, fearing he will become immortal and rule over them, cast him and his wife out of paradise and guard the tree of life with cherubim. They become jealous of Adam and attempt to shorten human lifetimes but are unable to do so due to fate. Sophia Zoe, in anger over the rulers' cursing of her companions, chases the rulers from their heavens and sends the phoenix to witness their judgment.

The conclusion discusses the nature of immortal humankind, explaining that the blessed and guileless spirits were sent to the world of destruction by the immortal father to bring about the condemnation of the rulers. The Word, or Jesus the Logos, was sent to announce what was unknown and reveal the hidden truth about the seven authorities of chaos. Before the end of the age, there will be a great shaking and war among the rulers, which will result in the downfall of the heavens and the powers of chaos. The light will cover the darkness, and the glory of the unconceived will fill the eternal realms. The perfect ones will return to their home, but the non-perfected ones will remain in the realms of immortals, unable to enter the kingless realm.

== Composition ==
On the Origin of the World contains many textual similarities to Hypostasis of the Archons, which is generally considered to be a combination of two sources: an exegesis on Genesis and a revelation dialogue known as the Apocalypse of Norea. Hans-Martin Schenke proposes that the Apocalypse was also incorporated into Origin. Roel van den Broek suggests both sources were used for both Origin and Hypostasis, but that Origin was later redacted by a Valentinian gnostic editor, leaving it "full of abrupt transitions and internal contradictions".

== See also ==
- On the Creation of the World (Ptolemy)
- On the Creation of the World (John Philoponus)
