= Yao (Gnosticism) =

Planetary alias in gnosticism for Jupiter

In Sethian Gnosticism, Yao or Iao (Ἰαω) is an archon. In On the Origin of the World, he is one of the three sons of Yaldabaoth, with the other two being Astaphaios and Eloai. In the Apocryphon of John, he is the fourth of the seven archons.

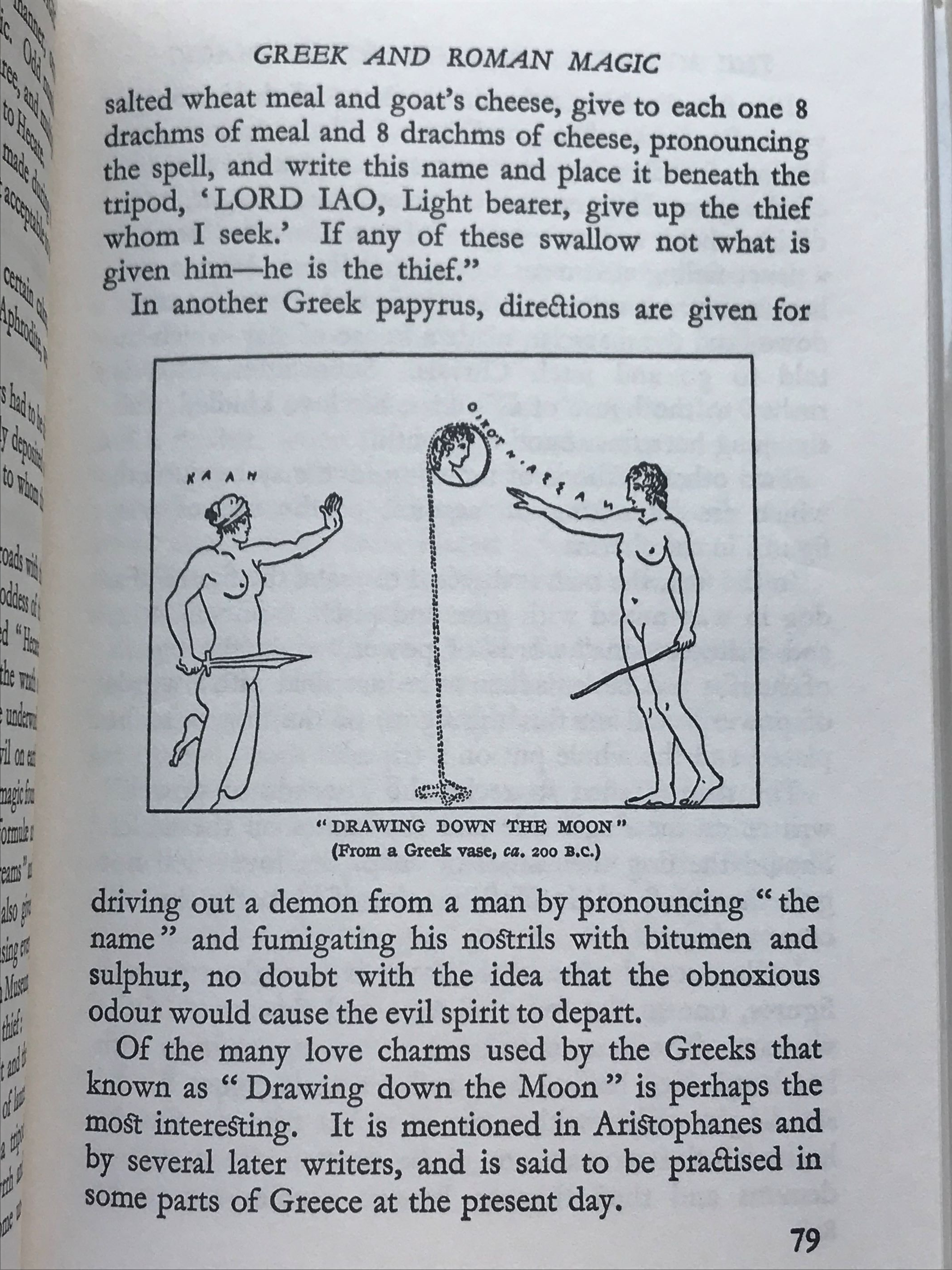

In Mandaeism, Yurba, the name of an uthra, is derived from Yao, with Rba ('Great') added at the end.

== See also ==
- Tetragrammaton
- Ἰαώ
- Yurba
