= Demiurge =

Creation spirit in some schools of philosophy

The Demiurge as depicted by Richard Teschner, in der Platte monogrammiert, 1915.

In the Platonic, Neopythagorean, Middle Platonic, and Neoplatonic schools of philosophy, the Demiurge (/ˈdɛmi.ɜːrdʒ/) is an artisan-like figure responsible for fashioning and maintaining the physical universe. Various schools of Gnostics adopted the term demiurge.

Although a fashioner, the demiurge is not necessarily the same as the creator figure in the monotheistic sense, because the demiurge itself and the material from which the demiurge fashions the universe are both considered consequences of something else. Depending on the system, they may be considered either uncreated and eternal or the product of some other entity. Some of these systems are monotheistic, while others are henotheistic or polytheistic.

== Etymology ==
The word demiurge is an English word derived from demiurgus, a Latinised form of the Greek δημιουργός (dēmiurgós). It was originally a common noun meaning "craftsman" or "artisan", but gradually came to mean "producer" and eventually "creator". The philosophical usage and the proper noun derive from Plato's Timaeus, written c. 360 BC, where the demiurge is presented as the creator of the universe. The demiurge is also described as a creator in the Platonic (c. 310–90 BC) and Middle Platonic (c. 90 BC – AD 300) philosophical traditions. In the various branches of the Neoplatonic school (third century onwards), the demiurge is the fashioner of the real, perceptible world after the model of the Ideas, but (in most Neoplatonic systems) is still not itself "the One".

== Plato and the Timaeus ==
In Plato's Timaeus, the speaker, Timaeus, introduces the Demiurge as an intelligent cause and craftsman who "fashioned and shaped" the physical world. He describes the Demiurge as unreservedly benevolent, and so it desires a world as good as possible. To create such a world, the Demiurge looks toward an unchanging, eternal model (the Forms) so that it can bring mathematical order to preexisting, disorderly motion. The result of his work is a universe as a living god with lesser gods, such as the stars, planets, and gods of traditional religion, inside it. Plato argues that the cosmos needed a Demiurge because the cosmos needed a cause that makes Becoming resemble Being. Timaeus is a philosophical reconciliation of Hesiod's cosmology in his Theogony, syncretically reconciling Hesiod to Homer, though other scholars have argued that Plato's theology "invokes a broad cultural horizon without committing to any specific poetic or religious tradition". Moreover, Plato believed that the Demiurge created other, so-called "lower" gods who, in turn, created humanity. Some scholars have argued that the lower gods are gods of traditional mythology, such as Zeus and Hera.

== Gnosticism ==
Within the vast spectrum of Gnostic traditions, views of the Demiurge range dramatically. It is generally understood and agreed upon to be a lesser divinity who governs the material universe. However, the nature of its rule over the material realm differs from school to school. Sethian Gnostics portray the Demiurge as an oppressive, ignorant ruler, intentionally binding spirits in an inherently corrupt material realm. In contrast, Valentinian Gnostics see the Demiurge as a well-meaning but limited figure whose rule reflects ignorance rather than malice.

=== Distinction ===
Gnostics present a distinction between the highest, unknowable God or Supreme Being and the demiurgic "creator" of the material, identified in some traditions with Yahweh, the God of the Hebrew Bible. Several systems of Gnostic thought present the Demiurge as antagonistic to the will of the Supreme Being, with his creation initially having the malevolent intention of entrapping aspects of the divine in materiality. In other systems, the Demiurge is instead portrayed as "merely" incompetent or foolish: his creation is an unconscious attempt to replicate the divine world (the pleroma) based on faint recollections, and thus ends up fundamentally flawed. Thus, in such systems, the Demiurge is a proposed solution to the problem of evil: while God, consisting of the Source and his emanations, the Aeons and angels, is omniscient and omnibenevolent, the Demiurge who rules over our own physical world is not.

Philo had inferred from the expression "Let us make man" of the Book of Genesis that God had used other beings as assistants in the creation of man, and he explains in this way why man is capable of vice as well as virtue, ascribing the origin of the latter to God, of the former to his helpers in the work of creation. The earliest Gnostic sects ascribe the work of creation to angels. So Irenaeus tells of the system of Simon Magus, of the system of Menander, of the system of Saturninus, in which the number of these angels is reckoned as seven, and of the system of Carpocrates. In Basilides's system, he reports, the world was made by the angels who occupy the lowest heaven; but special mention is made of their chief, who is said to have been the God of the Jews, to have led that people out of the land of Egypt, and to have given them their law. The prophecies are ascribed not to the chief but to the other world-making angels.

The Latin translation, confirmed by Hippolytus of Rome, makes Irenaeus state that according to Cerinthus (who shows Ebionite influence), creation was made by a power quite separate from the Supreme God and ignorant of him. Theodoret, who here copies Irenaeus, turns this into the plural number "powers", and so Epiphanius of Salamis represents Cerinthus as agreeing with Carpocrates in the doctrine that the world was made by angels.

=== Yaldabaoth ===
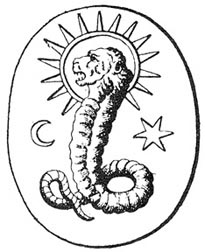
A lion-faced, serpentine deity found on a Gnostic gem in Bernard de Montfaucon's L'antiquité expliquée et représentée en figures, a depiction of Yaldabaoth

In the Archontic, Sethian, and Ophite systems, which have many affinities with the doctrine of Valentinus, the making of the world is ascribed to a company of seven archons, whose names are given, but still more prominent is their chief, "Yaldabaoth" (also known as "Yaltabaoth" or "Ialdabaoth").

In the Apocryphon of John c. AD 120–180, the demiurge declares that he has made the world by himself:

Now the archon ["ruler"] who is weak has three names. The first name is Yaldabaoth, the second is Saklas ["fool"], and the third is Samael ["blind god"]. And he is impious in his arrogance which is in him. For he said, 'I am God and there is no other God beside me,' for he is ignorant of his strength, the place from which he had come.

He is demiurge and maker of man, but as a ray of light from above enters the body of man and gives him a soul, Yaldabaoth is filled with envy; he tries to limit man's knowledge by forbidding him the fruit of knowledge in paradise. At the consummation of all things, all light will return to the Pleroma. But Yaldabaoth, the demiurge, with the material world, will be cast into the lower depths.

Yaldabaoth is frequently called "the Lion-faced", leontoeides, and is said to have the body of a serpent. The demiurge is also described as having a fiery nature, applying the words of Moses to him: "the Lord our God is a burning and consuming fire". Hippolytus claims that Simon used a similar description.

In Pistis Sophia, Yaldabaoth has already sunk from his high estate and resides in Chaos, where, with his forty-nine demons, he tortures wicked souls in boiling rivers of pitch, and with other punishments (pp. 257, 382). He is an archon with the face of a lion, half flame, and half darkness.

In the Nag Hammadi text On the Origin of the World, the three sons of Yaldabaoth are listed as Yao, Eloai, and Astaphaios.

Under the name of Nebro (rebel), Yaldabaoth is called an angel in the apocryphal Gospel of Judas. He is first mentioned in "The Cosmos, Chaos, and the Underworld" as one of the twelve angels to come "into being [to] rule over chaos and the [underworld]". He comes from heaven, and it is said his "face flashed with fire and [his] appearance was defiled with blood". Nebro creates six angels in addition to the angel Saklas to be his assistants. These six, in turn, create another twelve angels "with each one receiving a portion in the heavens".

==== Names ====
The etymology of the name Yaldabaoth has been subject to many speculative theories. Until 1974, etymologies deriving from the unattested Aramaic: בהותא, romanized: bāhūthā, supposedly meaning "chaos", represented the majority view. Following an analysis by the Jewish historian of religion Gershom Scholem published in 1974, this etymology no longer enjoyed any notable support. His analysis showed the unattested Aramaic term to have been fabulated and attested only in a single corrupted text from 1859, with its claimed translation having been transposed from the reading of an earlier etymology, whose explanation seemingly equated "darkness" and "chaos" when translating an unattested supposed plural form of Hebrew: בוהו, romanized: bōhu.

"Samael" literally means "Blind God" or "God of the Blind" in Hebrew (סמאל). This being is considered not only blind, or ignorant of its own origins, but may, in addition, be evil; its name is also found in Judaism as the Angel of Death and in Christian demonology. This link to Judeo-Christian tradition leads to a further comparison with Satan. Another alternative title for the demiurge is "Saklas", Aramaic for "fool". In the Apocryphon of John, Yaldabaoth is also known as both Sakla and Samael.

The angelic name "Ariel" (Hebrew: 'the lion of God') has also been used to refer to the Demiurge and is called his "perfect" name; in some Gnostic lore, Ariel has been called an ancient or original name for Ialdabaoth. The name has also been inscribed on amulets as "Ariel Ialdabaoth", and the figure of the archon inscribed with "Aariel".

=== Marcion ===
According to Marcion, the title God was given to the Demiurge, who was to be sharply distinguished from the higher Good God. The former was díkaios, severely just, the latter agathós, or loving-kind; the former was the God of the Old Testament, the latter the true God of the New Testament. Christ, in reality, is the Son of the Good God. The true believer in Christ entered into God's kingdom; the unbeliever remained forever the slave of the Demiurge.

=== Valentinus ===
It is in the system of Valentinus that the name Dēmiurgos is used, which occurs nowhere in Irenaeus except in connection with the Valentinian system. When it is employed by other Gnostics either it is not used in a technical sense, or its use has been borrowed from Valentinus. But it is only the name that can be said to be specially Valentinian; the personage intended by it corresponds more or less closely with the Yaldabaoth of the Ophites, the great Archon of Basilides, the Elohim of Justinus, etc.

The Valentinian theory elaborates that from Achamoth (he kátō sophía or lower wisdom) three kinds of substance take their origin, the spiritual (pneumatikoí), the animal (psychikoí) and the material (hylikoí). The Demiurge belongs to the second kind, as he was the offspring of a union of Achamoth with matter. And as Achamoth herself was only the daughter of Sophía the last of the thirty Aeons, the Demiurge was distant by many emanations from the Propatôr, or Supreme God.

In creating this world out of Chaos the Demiurge was unconsciously influenced for good; and the universe, to the surprise even of its Maker, became almost perfect. The Demiurge regretted even its slight imperfection, and as he thought himself the Supreme God, he attempted to remedy this by sending a Messiah. To this Messiah, however, was actually united with Jesus the Saviour, Who redeemed men. These are either hylikoí or pneumatikoí.

The first, or material men, will return to the grossness of matter and finally be consumed by fire; the second, or animal men, together with the Demiurge, will enter a middle state, neither Pleroma nor hyle; the purely spiritual men will be completely freed from the influence of the Demiurge and together with the Saviour and Achamoth, his spouse, will enter the Pleroma divested of body (hyle) and soul (psyché). In this most common form of Gnosticism the Demiurge had an inferior though not intrinsically evil function in the universe as the head of the animal, or psychic world.

=== Devil ===
Opinions on the devil, and his relationship to the Demiurge, vary. The Ophites held that he and his demons constantly oppose and thwart the human race, as it was on their account the devil was cast down into this world. According to one variant of the Valentinian system, the Demiurge is also the maker, out of the appropriate substance, of an order of spiritual beings, the devil, the prince of this world, and his angels. But the devil, as being a spirit of wickedness, is able to recognise the higher spiritual world, of which his maker the Demiurge, who is only animal, has no real knowledge. The devil resides in this lower world, of which he is the prince, the Demiurge in the heavens; his mother Sophia in the middle region, above the heavens and below the Pleroma.

The Valentinian Heracleon interpreted the devil as the principle of evil, that of hyle (matter). As he writes in his commentary on John 4:21,

The mountain represents the Devil, or his world, since the Devil was one part of the whole of matter, but the world is the total mountain of evil, a deserted dwelling place of beasts, to which all who lived before the law and all Gentiles render worship. But Jerusalem represents the creation or the Creator whom the Jews worship. ... You then who are spiritual should worship neither the creation nor the Craftsman, but the Father of Truth.

This vilification of the creator was held to be inimical to Christianity by the early fathers of the church. In refuting the beliefs of the gnostics, Irenaeus stated that "Plato is proved to be more religious than these men, for he allowed that the same God was both just and good, having power over all things, and himself executing judgment."

== Platonism ==
=== Middle Platonism ===
In Numenius's Neo-Pythagorean and Middle Platonist cosmogony, the Demiurge is second God as the nous or thought of intelligibles and sensibles.

=== Plotinus ===
The work of Plotinus and other later Platonists in the 3rd century AD to further clarify the Demiurge is known as Neoplatonism. To Plotinus, the second emanation represents an uncreated second cause (see Pythagoras' Dyad). Plotinus sought to reconcile Aristotle's energeia with Plato's Demiurge, which, as Demiurge and mind (nous), is a critical component in the ontological construct of human consciousness used to explain and clarify substance theory within Platonic realism (also called idealism). In order to reconcile Aristotelian with Platonian philosophy, Plotinus metaphorically identified the demiurge (or nous) within the pantheon of the Greek Gods as Zeus.

==== Henology ====
The first and highest aspect of God is described by Plato as the One (Τὸ Ἕν, 'To Hen'), the source, or the Monad. This is the God above the Demiurge, and manifests through the actions of the Demiurge. The Monad emanated the demiurge or Nous (consciousness) from its "indeterminate" vitality due to the monad being so abundant that it overflowed back onto itself, causing self-reflection. This self-reflection of the indeterminate vitality was referred to by Plotinus as the "Demiurge" or creator. The second principle is organization in its reflection of the nonsentient force or dynamis, also called the one or the Monad. The dyad is energeia emanated by the one that is then the work, process or activity called nous, Demiurge, mind, consciousness that organizes the indeterminate vitality into the experience called the material world, universe, cosmos. Plotinus also elucidates the equation of matter with nothing or non-being in The Enneads which more correctly is to express the concept of idealism or that there is not anything or anywhere outside of the "mind" or nous (cf. pantheism).

Plotinus' form of Platonic idealism is to treat the Demiurge, nous, as the contemplative faculty (ergon) within man which orders the force (dynamis) into conscious reality. In this, he claimed to reveal Plato's true meaning: a doctrine he learned from Platonic tradition that did not appear outside the academy or in Plato's text. This tradition of creator God as nous (the manifestation of consciousness) can be validated in the works of pre-Plotinus philosophers such as Numenius, as well as a connection between Hebrew and Platonic cosmology (see also Philo).

The Demiurge of Neoplatonism is the Nous (mind of God), and is one of the three ordering principles:

- Arche (Gr. 'beginning') – the source of all things,
- Logos (Gr. 'reason/cause') – the underlying order that is hidden beneath appearances,
- Harmonia (Gr. 'harmony') – numerical ratios in mathematics.

Before Numenius of Apamea and Plotinus' Enneads, no Platonic works ontologically clarified the Demiurge from the allegory in Plato's Timaeus. The idea of Demiurge was, however, addressed before Plotinus in the works of Christian writer Justin Martyr who built his understanding of the Demiurge on the works of Numenius.

==== Plotinus' Against the Gnostics ====
Gnostic schools of thought attributed falsehood or evil to the concept of the Demiurge or creator, though in some Gnostic traditions, such as that of Valentinius, the creator's position is fallen, ignorant, or inferior, rather than evil. The Neoplatonic philosopher Plotinus addressed within his works the Gnostics' conception of the Demiurge, which he saw as un-Hellenic and blasphemous to the Demiurge or creator of Plato. Plotinus, along with his teacher Ammonius Saccas, was the founder of Neoplatonism. In the ninth tractate of the second of his Enneads, Plotinus criticizes his opponents for their appropriation of ideas from Plato:

From Plato come their punishments, their rivers of the underworld and the changing from body to body; as for the plurality they assert in the Intellectual Realm—the Authentic Existent, the Intellectual-Principle, the Second Creator and the Soul—all this is taken over from the Timaeus.

— Ennead 2.9.vi; emphasis added from A. H. Armstrong's introduction to Ennead 2.9

Of note is the remark concerning the second hypostasis or Creator and third hypostasis or World Soul. Plotinus criticizes his opponents for "all the novelties through which they seek to establish a philosophy of their own" which, he declares, "have been picked up outside of the truth"; they attempt to conceal rather than admit their indebtedness to ancient philosophy, which they have corrupted by their extraneous and misguided embellishments. Thus their understanding of the Demiurge is similarly flawed in comparison to Plato's original intentions.

Whereas Plato's Demiurge is good wishing good on his creation, Gnostic thought contends that the Demiurge is not only the originator of evil but is evil as well. Hence the title of Plotinus' refutation: "Against Those That Affirm the Creator of the Kosmos and the Kosmos Itself to be Evil" (generally quoted as "Against the Gnostics"). Plotinus argues of the disconnect or great barrier that is created between the nous or mind's noumenon (see Heraclitus) and the material world (phenomenon) by believing the material world is evil.

The majority of scholars tend to understand Plotinus' opponents as being a Gnostic sect—certainly (specifically Sethian), several such groups were present in Alexandria and elsewhere about the Mediterranean during Plotinus' lifetime. Plotinus specifically points to the Gnostic doctrine of Sophia and her emission of the Demiurge.

Though the former understanding certainly enjoys the greatest popularity, the identification of Plotinus' opponents as Gnostic is not without some contention. Christos Evangeliou has contended that Plotinus' opponents might be better described as simply "Christian Gnostics", arguing that several of Plotinus' criticisms are as applicable to orthodox Christian doctrine as well. Also, considering the evidence from the time, Evangeliou thought the definition of the term "Gnostics" was unclear. Of note here is that while Plotinus' student Porphyry names Christianity specifically in Porphyry's own works, and Plotinus is to have been a known associate of the Christian Origen, none of Plotinus' works mention Christ or Christianity—whereas Plotinus specifically addresses his target in the Enneads as the Gnostics.

A. H. Armstrong identified the so-called "Gnostics" that Plotinus was attacking as Jewish and Pagan, in his introduction to the tract in his translation of the Enneads. Armstrong alluding to Gnostic thought being a Hellenic philosophical heresy of sorts, which later engaged Christianity and Neoplatonism.

John D. Turner, professor of religious studies at the University of Nebraska, and famed translator and editor of the Nag Hammadi library, stated that the text Plotinus and his students read was Sethian Gnosticism, which predates Christianity. It appears that Plotinus attempted to clarify how the philosophers of the academy had not arrived at the same conclusions (such as dystheism or misotheism for the creator God as an answer to the problem of evil) as the targets of his criticism.

=== Iamblichus ===
Later, the Neoplatonist Iamblichus changed the role of the "One", effectively altering the role of the Demiurge as second cause or dyad, which was one of the reasons that Iamblichus and his teacher Porphyry came into conflict.

The figure of the Demiurge emerges in the theoretic of Iamblichus, which conjoins the transcendent, incommunicable “One,” or Source. Here, at the summit of this system, the Source and Demiurge (material realm) coexist via the process of henosis. Iamblichus describes the One as a monad whose first principle or emanation is intellect (nous), while among "the many" that follow it there is a second, super-existent "One" that is the producer of intellect or soul (psyche).

The "One" is further separated into spheres of intelligence; the first and superior sphere is objects of thought, while the latter sphere is the domain of thought. Thus, a triad is formed of the intelligible nous, the intellective nous, and the psyche in order to reconcile further the various Hellenistic philosophical schools of Aristotle's actus and potentia (actuality and potentiality) of the unmoved mover and Plato's Demiurge.

Then within this intellectual triad Iamblichus assigns the third rank to the Demiurge, identifying it with the perfect or Divine nous with the intellectual triad being promoted to a hebdomad (pure intellect).

In the theoretic of Plotinus, nous produces nature through intellectual mediation, thus the intellectualizing gods are followed by a triad of psychic gods.

== Later representations ==
The Cathars apparently inherited their idea of Satan as the creator of the evil world from Gnostic thought. Gilles Quispel writes, "There is a direct link between ancient Gnostic thought and the thoughts of the Cathars. The Cathars held that the creator of the world, Satanael, had usurped the name of God, but that he had subsequently been unmasked and told that he was not really God."

Emil Cioran also wrote his Le mauvais démiurge ("The Evil Demiurge"), published in 1969, influenced by Gnostic thought and Schopenhauerian interpretation of Platonic ontology, as well as that of Plotinus.

== See also ==
- Albinus (philosopher)
- Azazil
- Book of Enoch
- Devil in Christianity
- Problem of the creator of God
- Ptahil
- Tenth intellect (Isma'ilism)
- Urizen
