= Birger A. Pearson =

American academic (1934–2025)

Birger Pearson
- Born: 17 September 1934; California, United States
- Died: 16 April 2025 (aged 90)
- Education: Upsala College (BA); University of California, Berkeley (MA); Harvard University (PhD)

Birger A. Pearson (September 17, 1934 – April 16, 2025) was an American scholar and professor studying early Christianity and Gnosticism. He held the positions of Professor Emeritus of Religious Studies at the University of California, Santa Barbara and Professor and Interim Director of the Religious Studies Program at the University of California, Berkeley.

== Life and career ==
Pearson was born in 1934 in California. He earned a BA in Classical languages in 1957 from Upsala College; a Bachelor of Divinity in Biblical Studies and Theology from Pacific Lutheran Theological Seminary in 1962; an MA in Greek from the University of California, Berkeley in 1959; and a PhD in New Testament and Christian Origins from Harvard University in 1968 under Helmut Koester.

Pearson taught courses in Early Christianity, the New Testament, Hellenistic Judaism, Hellenistic Religions, Gnosticism, Coptic language and literature, the Hebrew Bible, Nordic Religions, and Theory of Religion at the University of California, Santa Barbara, from 1969 to 1994. During his career he also taught at schools such as at Pacific Lutheran Theological Seminary, Harvard University, the Episcopal Theological School, Harvard Divinity School, Duke University, Uppsala University, the Graduate Theological Union, UC Berkeley, and Lund University.

Pearson was heavily involved in the Society of Biblical Literature, where he served in leadership roles for over two decades. He was also a member of numerous other groups and societies. He was elected a Member of the Catholic Biblical Association in 1978.

Pearson died on April 16, 2025, at the age of 90.

== Work ==
Pearson was one of the original translators of the Nag Hammadi library, and was also involved with the 2007 translation by Marvin Meyer. In his writings, he explores the origins of Gnosticism and Christianity. Unlike many scholars, who see Gnosticism as a Christian heresy, Pearson believed that it emerged from Jewish mystics disaffected with the Jerusalem religious authorities, who were influenced by Platonism and mystery religion.

His book, Ancient Gnosticism: Traditions and Literature, examines the primary texts for Gnostic beliefs, including Christian Gnosticism, Hermetic Gnosticism, Mandaeanism, and Manicheanism.

Pearson published over 185 book reviews and wrote articles in both English and Swedish. He was also a member of nine editorial boards.

== Publications ==
- Ancient Gnosticism: Traditions and Literature (2007), Fortress Press, ISBN 978-0-8006-3258-8
- The Emergence of Christian Religion: Essays on Early Christianity (1997), Trinity Press International, ISBN 978-1-56338-218-5
- The Future of Early Christianity: Essays in Honor of Helmut Koester (1991), Fortress Press, ISBN 978-0-8006-2521-4
- Gnosticism and Christianity in Roman and Coptic Egypt (Studies in Antiquity and Christianity) (2004), T & T Clark Publishers, ISBN 978-0-567-02610-1
- Gnosticism, Judaism, and Egyptian Christianity (Studies in Antiquity and Christianity) (1990), Augsburg Fortress Publishers, ISBN 978-0-8006-3104-8

== Honors ==
In 2002 Pearson received an honorary doctorate from the Faculty of Theology at Uppsala University, Sweden.

In 2013, Practicing Gnosis: Ritual, Magic, Theurgy and Liturgy in Nag Hammadi, Manichaean and Other Ancient Literature was published in honor of Pearson.
