= Archon (Gnosticism) =

Builders of the physical realm that serve the demiurge

Archons (Greek: ἄρχων, romanized: árchōn, plural: Greek: ἄρχοντες, romanized: árchontes), in Gnosticism and religions closely related to it, are the builders of the physical universe. Among the Archontics, Ophites, Sethians and in the writings of Nag Hammadi library, the archons are rulers, each related to one of seven planets; they prevent souls from leaving the material realm. The political connotation of their name reflects rejection of the governmental system as flawed without chance of true salvation. In Manichaeism, the archons are the rulers of a realm within the "Kingdom of Darkness", who together make up the Prince of Darkness. In the Hypostasis of the Archons, the physical appearance of Archons is described as androgynous, with their faces being those of beasts.

== Hebdomad ==
A characteristic feature of the Gnostic concept of the universe is the role played in almost all Gnostic systems by the seven world-creating archons, known as the Hebdomad (Koine Greek: ἑβδομάς). These Seven are, in most systems, semi-hostile powers and are reckoned as the last and lowest emanations of the Godhead; below them—and frequently considered as proceeding from them—comes the world of the devilish powers. There are indeed certain exceptions; Basilides taught the existence of a "great archon" called Abraxas who presided over 365 archons.

Evidently, from works such as the Apocryphon of John, the Ophite Diagrams, On the Origin of the World and Pistis Sophia, archons play an important role in Gnostic cosmology. Probably originally referring to the Greek daimons of the planets, in Gnosticism they became the demonic rulers of the material world, each associated with a different celestial sphere. As rulers over the material world, they are called ἄρχοντες (archontes, "principalities", or "rulers"). As with Classical astronomy, which thought of a sphere of fixed stars above the spheres of the seven planets, beyond the spheres of the evil archons (Hebdomad), there were the supercelestial regions which a soul must reach by gnosis to escape the dominion of the archons. This place is thought of as the abode of Sophia (Wisdom) and Barbelo, also called Ogdoad.

== Naming and associations ==
The Ophites accepted the existence of these seven archons (Origen, Contra Celsum, vi. 31; a nearly identical list is given in On the Origin of the World):

- Yaldabaoth, called also Saklas who emerged later, Archon of fornication and Samael
  - Saturn.
  - 2nd Heaven. 6th Heaven and 7th Heaven. 8th Heaven. Cast into Tartarus
  - Feminine name: Pronoia (Forethought) Sambathas, "week".
  - Prophets: Moses, Joshua, Amos, Habakkuk.
  - From Hebrew yalda bahut, "Child of Chaos"? The outermost who created the six others, and therefore the chief ruler and Demiurge par excellence. Called "the Lion-faced", leontoeides.
- Yao
  - Jupiter.
  - 1st Heaven.
  - Feminine name: Lordship.
  - Prophets: Samuel, Nathan, Jonah, Micah.
  - Perhaps from Yahweh, but possibly also from the magic cry iao in the mystery cults.
- Sabaoth
  - Mars.
  - 6th Heaven. 7th Heaven. Above 7th Heaven. World of poverty – Sabaoth together with his son Christ.
  - Feminine name: Deity.
  - Prophets: Elijah, Joel, Zechariah.
    - Pistis Sophia supported Sabbaoth in his rebellion against his father, so she established the kingdom for Sabbaoth over everyone that he might dwell above the twelve gods of chaos receiving great authority against all the forces of chaos. Hence, his name is derived from Sabbath, which corresponds to the 7th Heaven of rest that he rules indicating either rest from his struggle or as the one who will not rest on his father's creation but change it. The Hebrew Bible term Tzevaot "Armies" was thought a proper name, hence Jupiter Sabbas or Sabazios.
- Adonaios
  - The Sun.
  - Feminine name: Kingship.
  - Prophets: Isaiah, Ezekiel, Jeremiah, Daniel.
  - From the Hebrew term for "the Lord", used of God; Adonis of the Syrians representing the Winter sun in the cosmic tragedy of Tammuz.
- Astaphaios
  - Venus.
  - 6th Heaven which is Sophia, a name of the female aspect of the lowest Heaven. 8th Heaven - possibly Ogdoad or Pleroma. together with Christ. 4th Heaven. 9th Heaven – Abortion.
  - Feminine name: Sophia.
  - Prophets: Esdras, Zephaniah.
- Elaios, sometimes Ailoein, or Adonaeus
  - 5th Heaven or 6th Heaven.
  - Mercury.
  - Feminine name: Jealousy.
  - Prophets: Tobias, Haggai.
  - From Elohim, God (El).
- Horaios
  - The Moon.
  - Feminine name: Wealth.
  - Prophets: Michaiah, Nahum.
  - From Jaroah? or "light"? or Horus?
- Seth
  - 3rd Heaven.
- David
  - 4th Heaven.

=== On the Origin of the World ===
In the Nag Hammadi text On the Origin of the World, the Seven Powers of the Heavens of Chaos are:

- Yaldabaoth, representing forethought (Sambathas)
- Yao, representing mastery
- Sabaoth, representing divinity
- Adonaios, representing kingship
- Eloaios, representing envy
- Oraios, representing wealth
- Astaphaios, equated with Sophia

=== Pistis Sophia ===
The last book of the Pistis Sophia contains the myth of the capture of the rebellious archons, whose leaders here appear as five in number.

- Paraplex
- Hekate
- Ariouth (females)
- Typhon
- Iachtanabas (males)

=== Apocryphon of John ===
In the Apocryphon of John, the demiurge Yaldabaoth, who is also known by the names Sakla and Samael, creates the "twelve authorities", who are:

- Athoth (the reaper)
- Harmas (the jealous eye)
- Kalila-Oumbri
- Yabel
- Adonaios (Sabaoth)
- Cain (the sun)
- Abel
- Abrisene
- Yobel
- Armoupieel
- Melcheir-Adonein
- Belias (ruler over the depth of the underworld)

The twelve authorities then create the "Seven Powers", who are described as representing the seven days of the week:

- Athoth, representing goodness, with the face of a sheep
- Eloaios, representing forethought, with the face of a donkey
- Astaphaios, representing divinity, with the face of a hyena
- Yao, representing lordship, with the face of a snake with seven heads
- Sabaoth, representing kingdom, with the face of a snake
- Adonin, representing jealousy, with the face of an ape
- Sabbataios, representing understanding, with the face of a flaming fire

=== In Epiphanius ===
In the system of the Gnostics mentioned by Epiphanius we find, as the Seven Archons,

- Iao
- Saklas (the chief demon of Manichaeism)
- Seth
- David
- Eloiein
- Elilaios, probably connected with Enlil of Nippur, Babylonia
- Yaldabaoth (or no. 6 Yaldaboath, no. 7 Sabaoth)

=== Hellenized form ===
In the Hellenized form of Gnosticism, either all or some of these names are replaced by personified vices. Authadia (Authades), or Audacity, is the obvious description of Yaldabaoth, the presumptuous Demiurge, who is lion-faced as the Archon Authadia. Of the archons Kakia, Zelos, Phthonos, Errinnys, Epithymia, the last represents Venus. The number seven is obtained by placing a proarchon or chief archon at the head. That these names are only a disguise for the Sancta Hebdomas is clear, for Sophia, the mother of them, retains the name of Ogdoad, Octonatio. Occasionally, as among the Naassenes, one meets with the archon Esaldaios, which is evidently the El Shaddai of the Bible, and he is described as the archon "number four" (harithmo tetartos).

== Mandaeism ==
In Mandaean cosmology, Ptahil-Uthra, although not a deity, can be considered the primary archon since he is viewed as the creator of the material world.

Among the Mandaeans, there is a different conception of the Seven, which may pre-date later use by other Gnostic movements. In Mandaeism, the Seven, together with their mother Namrus (Ruha) and their father (Ur), are planets that belong entirely to the World of Darkness. They and their family are looked upon as captives of the angel Manda-d'hayye ('Knowledge of Life'), who pardons them, sets them on chariots of light, and appoints them as rulers of the world.

== Manichaeism ==
The Manicheans readily adopted the Gnostic usage, and their archons are invariably evil beings, who make up the Prince of Darkness. It is related how the helper of Adam Kadmon, the spirit of life, captured the evil archons, and fastened them to the firmament, or according to another account, flayed them, and formed the firmament from their skin, and this conception is closely related to the other, though in this tradition the number (seven) of the archons is lost.

== Origins ==
=== Planets ===
Irenaeus tells us that "the holy Hebdomad is the seven stars which they call planets". It is safe, therefore, to take the above seven Gnostic names as designating the seven planetary divinities: the sun, moon and five planets. In the Mandaean system the Seven are introduced with the Babylonian names of the planets. The connection of the Seven with the planets is also clearly established by the expositions of Celsus and Origen (Contra Celsum, vi. 2 2 seq.) and similarly by the above-cited passage in the Pistis Sophia, where the archons, who are here mentioned as five, are identified with the five planets (excluding the sun and moon).

In this, as in several other systems, the traces of the planetary seven have been obscured, but hardly in any have they become totally effaced. What tended most to obliterate the sevenfold distinction was the identification of the God of the Jews, the Lawgiver, with Yaldabaoth and his designation as World-creator, whereas formerly the seven planets together ruled the world. This confusion, however, was suggested by the very fact that at least five of the seven archons bore Old-Testament names for God—El Shaddai, Adonai, Elohim, Jehovah, Sabaoth.

Wilhelm Anz has also pointed out that Gnostic eschatology, consisting in the soul's struggle with hostile archons in its attempt to reach the Pleroma, is a close parallel of the soul's ascent, in Babylonian astrology, through the realms of the seven planets to Anu. The late Babylonian religion can definitely be indicated as the home of these ideas.

In Mandaeism, the seven planets are generally not viewed favorably, since they constitute part of the entourage of Ruha, the Queen of the World of Darkness who is also their mother (see Mandaean cosmology).

=== Zoroastrianism ===
The Bundahishn tells us that in the primeval strife of the devil against the light-world, seven hostile powers were captured and set as constellations in the heavens, where they are guarded by good star-powers and prevented from doing harm. Five of the evil powers are the planets, while here the sun and moon are of course not reckoned among the evil powers—for the obvious reason that in the Persian official religion they invariably appear as good divinities. It must be also noted that the Mithras mysteries, so closely connected with the Persian religion, are acquainted with this doctrine of the ascent of the soul through the planetary spheres.

=== Fallen angels ===
In On the Origin of the World, the archons impregnate the Biblical Eve, an idea probably deriving from the Sons of God in Genesis 6:1–4 or the Book of Enoch. In accordance with the depictions of fallen angels in the Enochian writings, the archons incite passions to humans. Further, they both teach idolatry, sacrifices and bloodshed to enslave the Gnostics and trapping them in ignorance.

== Greek theology ==
The mythology of ancient Greece knew gods, daemons, and heroes. Theoí árchontes (Greek: Θεοὶ ἄρχοντες, "ruling gods") appear in the subsequent philosophy of Plato. However Philo never alludes to archons: in a single passage (De Mon. i. 1), Archontes is merely correlative to ypíkooi (Greek: ὑπήκοοι, "lords").

Presently the syncretism of the later Greek philosophy found room for archons, which appear in Neoplatonism and were claimed to derive from Plato's unwritten tradition. They are inserted by the author of the book De Mysteriis Aegyptiorum, and even it would seem by his questioner Porphyry, below gods, daemons, angels, and archangels, and above heroes (omitted by Porphyry) and departed "souls", in the scale of invisible beings whose presence may become manifest. It may be only an accidental coincidence that about the end of the 2nd century "Archon" was one of the names given by the Platonist Harpocration to the "Second God" of Numenius (Proclus in Tim. 93 C).

For all the series of the ruling Gods (θεοὶ ἄρχοντες), are collected into the intellectual fabrication as into a summit, and subsist about it. And as all the fountains are the progeny of the intelligible father, and are filled from him with intelligible union, thus likewise, all the orders of the principles or rulers, are suspended according to nature from the demiurgus, and participate from thence of an intellectual life.

— Proclus, The Theology of Plato

== See also ==
- Archon
- Aeon (Gnosticism)
- Luminary (Gnosticism)
