= Yaldabaoth =

Malevolent creator in Gnosticism

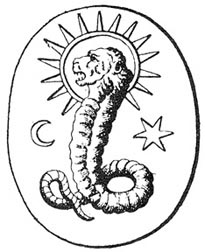
A depiction of Yaldabaoth as a lion-faced, serpentine deity on a Gnostic gem in Bernard de Montfaucon's L'antiquité expliquée et représentée en figures (1719—1724).

Yaldabaoth, sometimes spelled Jaldabaoth or Ialdabaoth (Note: Spelling differs based on assumptions of the name deriving from a Semitic language in which the first letter represents a Yodh and should encode a voiced palatal approximant sound (IPA: [j]); German-speaking scholars (such as Scholem and Adam) favoured the spelling of "Jaldabaoth" based on German orthography even when writing in English, while English-speaking authors more commonly use "Yaldabaoth".) (/ˌjɑːldəˈbeɪɒθ/; Koine Greek: Ιαλδαβαώθ, romanized: Ialdabaóth; Latin: Ialdabaoth; Coptic: ⲒⲀⲖⲦⲀⲂⲀⲰⲐ Ialtabaôth), is a malevolent god and demiurge (creator of the material world) according to various Gnostic sects, represented sometimes as a theriomorphic, lion-headed serpent. He is identified as a false god and archon who keeps souls trapped in physical bodies, imprisoned in the material universe.

The origins of the name Yaldabaoth are heavily debated, with scholars proposing a variety of meanings generally stemming from Hebrew and Aramaic. David M. Litwa traces the myth of Yaldabaoth himself to the practice of interpretatio graeca, which Egyptians of the Ptolemaic Kingdom adopted from the Greeks. They identified traits of Yahweh, the Jewish god, with the Egyptian god Set, whom they considered malevolent. Set's Hellenistic depiction as having a donkey head was used by Egyptians to mock Yahweh and Jews in response to Jews mocking Egyptians as beast worshippers. This concept of Yahweh as an evil donkey-headed god spread among the Greco-Roman world, leading some Gnostics to conceive of Yaldabaoth as an evil version of the Christian god.

Depending on the particular Gnostic tradition, Yaldabaoth is considered the uniparental son of Sophia. Yaldabaoth works to suppress the divine spark within humans which was instilled by Sophia, as well as demanding that humans acknowledge him as God. Some Gnostic sects regard Yaldabaoth as the God of the Old Testament whom they consider malevolent, as opposed to the good Monad who created the spiritual world, though others consider him incompetent rather than malevolent. Biblical events such as the expulsion of Adam and Eve from the Garden of Eden, the Flood, and the crucifixion of Jesus are viewed as punishments by Yaldabaoth upon those who reject him.

== Etymology ==
The etymology of the name Yaldabaoth has been subject to many speculative theories. The first etymology was advanced in 1575 by François Feuardent, supposedly translating it from Hebrew to mean Latin: a patribus genitus, lit. 'the child of fathers'. A theory proposed by Jacques Matter in 1828 identified the name as descending from Imperial Aramaic: ילדא, romanized: yāldā, lit. 'child' and Hebrew: בהות, romanized: bahot, a supposed plural form of Biblical Hebrew: בוהו, romanized: bōhu, lit. 'emptiness, darkness'. Matter, however, interpreted it to mean 'chaos', thus translating Yaldabaoth as "child of darkness [...] an element of chaos".

This etymology was popular due to its perceived literary merits. (Note: For example it was repeated in 1831 in a textbook by Johann Karl Ludwig Gieseler.) It inspired Adolf Bernhard Christoph Hilgenfeld to keep Matter's proposed 'chaos' translation, while fabulating a more plausible sounding, but unattested second noun: בהותא bāhūthā, deriving the name from ילדא בהותא yaldā bāhūthā, supposedly meaning 'child of chaos', in 1884. This and its variants became the majority opinion from the late 19th to the mid-20th century, and were endorsed by Hans-Martin Schenke, de:Alexander Böhlig, and Pahor Labib.

This analysis was convincingly deconstructed by Jewish historian of religion Gershom Scholem in 1974, who showed the unattested Aramaic term to have been fabulated and attested only in a single corrupted text from 1859, with its listed translation having been transposed from the reading of an earlier etymology, whose explanation seemingly equated "darkness" and "chaos" when translating an unattested supposed plural form of Hebrew: בוהו, romanized: bōhu. Consequently, most scholars retracted their endorsement (for example, Gilles Quispel did so by lamenting humorously that due to its literary merits he believes the originator of the name Yaldabaoth had made the same erroneous association between baoth and tohuwabohu as the former majority opinion). Additionally, Scholem argued that based on the earliest textual data, which termed Yaldabaoth "the King of Chaos", he was the progenitor of chaos, not its progeny.

Scholem's own theory rendered the name as Yald' Abaoth from Aramaic yaldā, but translated as 'begetter', not 'child', and Abaoth, a term attested in magic texts, derived from Sabaoth, one of the names of God in Judaism. Thus he rendered Yald' Abaoth as 'begetter of Sabaoth'. Matthew Black objects to this on the grounds that yaldā should in fact be read as "son" or "child" (the passive form) and Sabaoth is the name of one of Yaldabaoth's sons in some Gnostic texts, rather than the converse. Instead, he suggests the second noun to be Jewish Babylonian Aramaic: בהתייה, romanized: behtɘṯā, lit. 'shame', cognate with bōšeṯ (בושה), a term used to replace the name Ba'al in the Hebrew Bible. Thus Blacks' proposal renders ילדא בהתייה yaldā behtɘṯā 'son of shame/Baal'.

In his proposed 1967 etymology, Alfred Adam already diverged from the then-majority opinion and translated yaldā similarly to Scholem, as German: Erzeugung, lit. 'bringing forth'. He believed the name's second part to derive from Syriac: ܐܒܗܘܬܗ, romanized: ˀabbāhūṯā, lit. 'fatherhood'. This he interpreted, however, to describe more broadly 'the power of generation'; thus suggesting the name to mean 'the bringing forth of the power of generation'.

Robert M. Grant proposed in 1957 that Ialdabaoth was derived from Yah(weh) El(ohei)-Sabaoth, "Yahweh, God of Sabaoth (Hosts, Armies)" (צבאות), a name of God in Judaism found with variants in 1 Samuel 1:3, 2 Samuel 7, the Book of Amos (3:13, 5:15-16, 27, and elsewhere), 1 Kings, Book of Jeremiah, Zechariah 3:10, and Psalm 89:9. He notes that the change from the tsade to a dalet or a teth is sometimes seen in Aramaic.

Simone Pétrement made an argument against Schloem's etymology through analysis of Gnostic mythic texts, and derived it from Iao Sabaoth, which is attested in the Greek Magical Papyri — possibly independently from Grant, although she would not rule out having read Grant's article at some prior point.

== Historical origins ==
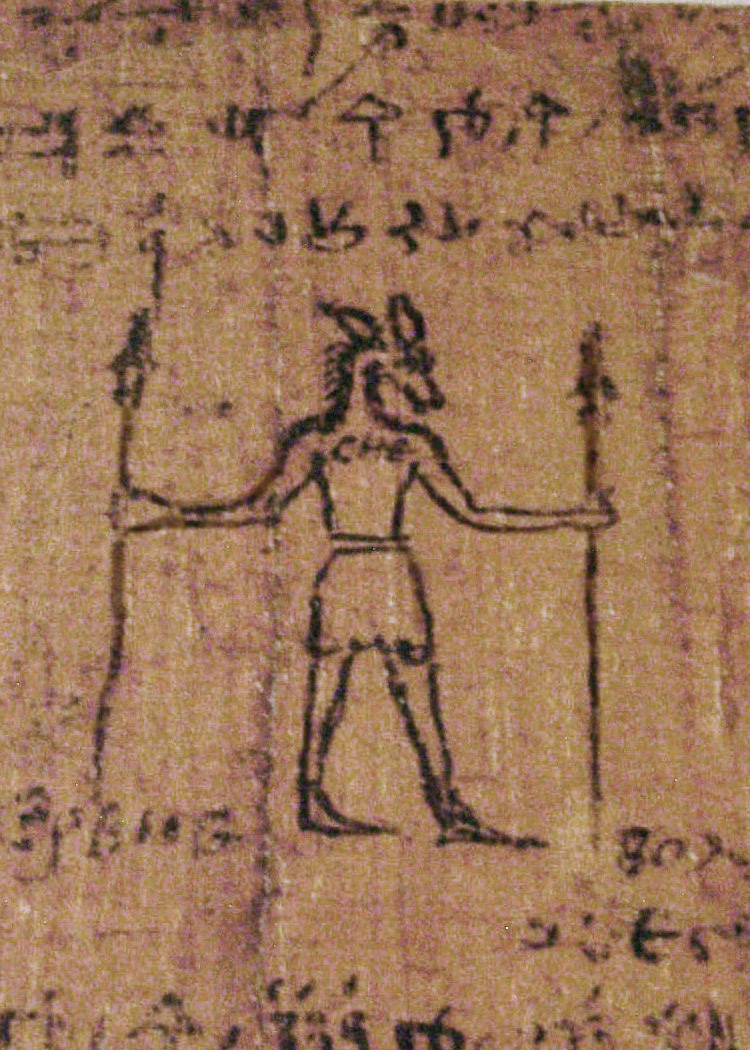
The donkey-headed Set depicted in the Greek Magical Papyri

Alexamenos graffito depicting a crucified Jesus as a donkey-headed god

After the Assyrian conquest of Egypt in the 7th century BCE, Set was considered an evil deity by the ancient Egyptians and not commonly worshipped, in large part due to his role as the god of foreigners. From at least 200 BCE onward, a tradition developed in the Ptolemaic Kingdom that identified Yahweh, the God of the Jews, with the Egyptian god Set. Diverging from previous zoologically multiplicitous depictions, Set's appearance during the Hellenistic period onwards was depicted as resembling a man with a donkey's head.

The Greek practice of interpretatio graeca, ascribing the gods of another people's pantheon to corresponding ones in one's own, had been adopted by the Egyptians after their Hellenization; during the process of which they had identified Set with Typhon, a snake-monster that roars like a lion.

The story of the Exodus, featured in the Hebrew Bible, speaks of the ancestors of the Israelites as a nation betrayed and subjugated by the Pharaoh, for whom Yahweh subjects Egyptians to Plagues of Egypt, including destroying their country, defiling the Nile, and killing all their first-born sons. Jewish migration within the Ptolemaic Kingdom to Greek-speaking Egyptian cities such as Alexandria led to the creation of the Septuagint, a translation of the Hebrew Bible into Koine Greek. Furthermore, the story of the Exodus was adapted by Ezekiel the Tragedian as the Exagōgḗ ἐξαγωγή, a play performed in Alexandria and seen by Egyptians and Jews. Egyptian receptions of the Exodus story were widely negative because it insulted their gods and praised their suffering. It inspired Egyptian works that retold the story, but altered its details to mock the Jews and exalt Egypt and its gods.

In this context, some Egyptians discerned similarities between Yahweh's in-narrative actions and attributes and those of Seth (such as being associated with foreigners, deserts, and storms), in addition to a phonetic resemblance between Ἰαω Iaō, Yahweh's name as used by hellenised Jews, and Coptic: ⲓⲱ, romanized: Iō, lit. 'donkey', then considered as the animal of Seth. From this arose a popular response to the Jewish accusation that Egyptians were merely worshipping beasts, namely that, in truth, the Jews themselves worshipped a beast, a donkey or a donkey-headed man, i.e., Set.

Accusations of onolatry against the Jews spread from the Egyptian milieu, with its understanding of the donkey's Set-related importance, to the rest of the Graeco-Roman world, which was largely ignorant of this context. In the most famous variations of narratives alleging Jewish onolatry, Antiochus IV Epiphanes, a Seleucid emperor famous for raiding the Temple in Jerusalem, supposedly discovered that its Holy of Holies was not empty, but instead contained a donkey idol, and Tacitus (early second century CE) claimed that the Jews dedicated in their holiest shrine a statue of a wild ass. (Note: A Gnostic reception of this account can be found in the Phibionite text Birth of Mary in it Zechariah son of Berachiah, father of John the Baptist, enters the Holiest of Holies as a pious priest but to his surprise finds a being in the form of donkey there. He runs out from the temple and wants to shout to crowd whom they had been worshipping, but cannot as the donkey deity froze his tongue. Despite the donkey god's best efforts to keep Zechariah silent he eventually manages to address the crowd, revealing their god to be shaped like a donkey. In response to which they kill him on the steps of the temple.) After the emergence of Christianity, the same charge was also repeated against its devotees. Most famously so in the earliest known depiction of the crucifixion of Jesus, the Alexamenos graffito, where a Christian by the name of Alexamenos is shown worshipping a donkey-headed crucified god.

According to Litwa, this tradition forms the basis for the development of Gnostic beliefs about Yaldabaoth. (Note: Accordingly, the Phibionites believed Yaldabaoth to have a donkey-like appearance. The Secret Book of John describes Yaldabaoth as a shape-shifting Typhon-like being, looking like a snake with a lion's head, but whose donkey-headed child Eloaios gives witness to his other more donkey-like forms.)

== Role in Gnosticism ==
The origins of Gnosticism are obscure and still disputed. Gnostics emphasised spiritual knowledge (gnosis) of the divine spark within, over faith (pistis) in the teachings and traditions of the various communities of Christians. Gnosticism presents a distinction between the highest, unknowable God, and the Demiurge, "creator" of the material universe. Gnostics considered the most essential part of the process of salvation to be this personal knowledge, in contrast to faith as an outlook in their worldview along with faith in the ecclesiastical authority.

In Gnosticism, the biblical serpent in the Garden of Eden was praised and thanked for bringing knowledge (gnosis) to Adam and Eve and thereby freeing them from the malevolent Demiurge's control. Gnostic Christian doctrines rely on a dualistic cosmology that implies the eternal conflict between good and evil, and a conception of the serpent as the liberating savior and bestower of knowledge to humankind opposed to the Demiurge or creator god, identified with the Yahweh from the Hebrew Bible. Some Gnostic Christians (such as Marcionites) considered the Hebrew God of the Old Testament as the evil, false god and creator of the material universe; and the Unknown God of the Gospel, the father of Jesus Christ and creator of the spiritual world, as the true, good God. In the Archontic, Sethian, and Ophite systems, Yaldabaoth is regarded as the malevolent Demiurge and false god of the Old Testament who generated the material universe and keeps the souls trapped in physical bodies, imprisoned in the world full of pain and suffering that he created.

However, not all Gnostics regarded the creator of the material universe as inherently evil or malevolent. For instance, Valentinians believed that the Demiurge is merely an ignorant and incompetent creator, trying to fashion the world as well as he can, but lacking the proper power to maintain its goodness. They were regarded as heretics by the proto-orthodox Early Church Fathers.

Yaldabaoth is mentioned mainly in the Archontic, Sethian, and Ophite writings of Gnostic literature, most of which have been discovered in the Nag Hammadi library. In the Apocryphon of John, "Yaldabaoth" is the first of three names of the domineering archon, along with Saklas and Samael. In Pistis Sophia he has lost his claim to rulership and, in the depths of Chaos, together with 49 demons, tortures sacrilegious souls in a scorching hot torrent of pitch. Here he is a lion-faced archon, half flame, half darkness. Yaldabaoth appears as a rebellious angel both in the apocryphal Gospel of Judas and the Gnostic work Hypostasis of the Archons. In some of these Gnostic texts, Yaldabaoth is further identified with the Ancient Roman god Saturnus.

=== Cosmogony and creation myths ===
Yaldabaoth is the son of Sophia, the personification of wisdom according to Gnosticism, with whom he contends. By creatively becoming matter in goodness and simplicity, Sophia created the imperfect Yaldabaoth, who has no knowledge of the other aeons. From his mother he received the powers of light, but he used them for evil. Sophia rules the Ogdoas, the Demiurge rules the Hebdomas. Yaldabaoth created six more archons and other fellows. The angels he created rebelled against Yaldabaoth. To keep the angels in subjection, Yaldabaoth generated the material universe.

In the act of creation, however, Yaldabaoth emptied himself of his supreme power. When Yaldabaoth breathed the soul into the first man, Adam, Sophia instilled in him the divine spark of the spirit. After matter, Yaldabaoth produced the serpent spirit (Ophiomorphos), which is the origin of all evil. The light being Sophia caused the fall of man through the serpent. By eating the forbidden fruit, Adam and Eve became wise and rejected Yaldabaoth. Eventually, Yaldabaoth expelled them from the ethereal region, the Paradise, as punishment.

Yaldabaoth continuously attempted to deprive human beings of the gift of the spark of light which he had unwittingly lost to them, or to keep them in bondage. As punishments, he tried to make humanity acknowledge him as God. Because of their lack of worship, he caused the Flood upon the human race, from which a feminine power such as Sophia or Pronoia (Providence) rescued Noah. Yaldabaoth made a covenant with Abraham, in which he was obligated to serve him along with his descendants. The Biblical prophets were to proclaim Yaldabaoth's glory, but at the same time, through Sophia's influence, they reminded people of their higher origin and prepared for the coming of Christ. At Sophia's instigation, Yaldabaoth arranged for the generation of Jesus through the Virgin Mary. For his proclamation, he used John the Baptist. At the moment of the baptism organized by Yaldabaoth, Sophia took on the body of Jesus and through it taught people that their destiny was the Kingdom of Light (the spiritual world), not the Kingdom of Darkness (the material universe). Only after his baptism did Jesus receive divine power and could perform miracles. But since Jesus destroyed his kingdom instead of promoting it, Yaldabaoth had him crucified. Before his martyrdom, Christ escaped from the bodily shell and returned to the spiritual world.

== Psychological interpretations ==
The psychologist Carl Jung interpreted the Demiurge as a psychological symbol for the ego, which has forgotten its origins in the greater Self. This psychological archetype bears a functional resemblance to the modern concept of the inner critic.

== See also ==
- Ancient Semitic religion
- Apedemak
- Atenism
- Baháʼí Faith and the unity of religion
- The Bible and violence
- Canaanite religion
- Chinese dragon
- Dhimmi
- Dystheism
- Ethical monotheism
- Evil God challenge
- False prophet
- God in Abrahamic religions
- Misotheism
- Moralistic therapeutic deism
- Níðhöggr
- Outline of theology
- Prince of Darkness (Manichaeism)
- Problem of evil
- Problem of Hell
- Religion in pre-Islamic Arabia
- Serpents in the Bible
- Theodicy
- Trickster
- Urmonotheismus
- Violence in the Quran
