= Jesus in Ahmadiyya =

Jesus as seen in the Ahmadiyya traditions

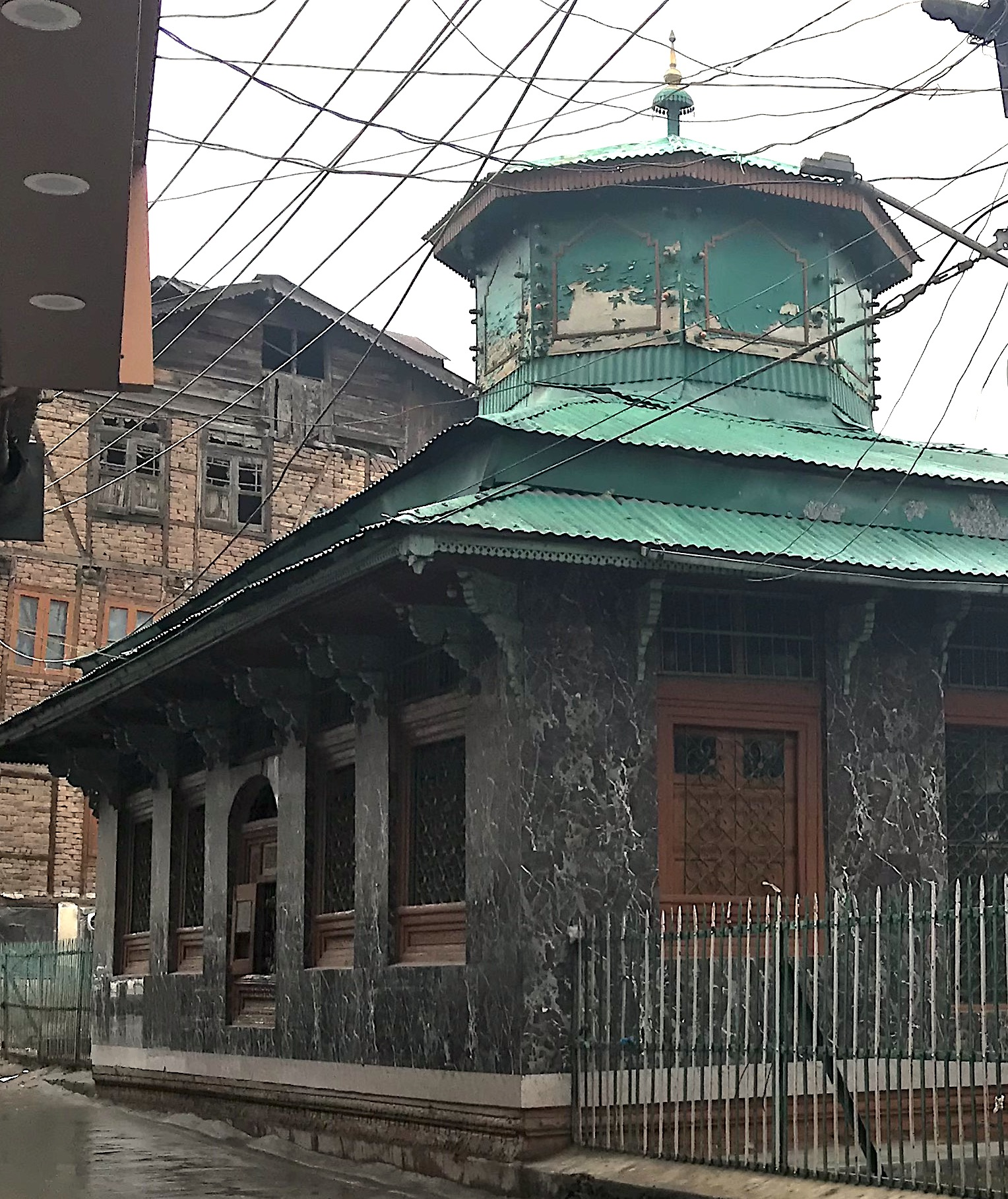
The Roza Bal shrine in Srinagar, Kashmir, India, believed by Ahmadi Muslims to be the tomb of Jesus.

Ahmadi Muslims consider Jesus (ʿĪsā) as a mortal man, entirely human, and a prophet of God born to the Virgin Mary (Maryam). Jesus is understood to have survived the crucifixion based on the account of the canonical Gospels, the Qurʾān, hadith literature, and revelations (waḥy and kašf) to Mirza Ghulam Ahmad. Having delivered his message to the Israelites in Judea, Jesus is understood to have emigrated eastward to escape persecution from Judea and to have further spread his message to the Lost Tribes of Israel. Ahmadi Muslims accept that Jesus died a natural death in India. Jesus lived to old age and later died in Srinagar, Kashmir, and his tomb is presently located at the Roza Bal shrine.

Although sharing many similarities with the other Islamic views of Jesus, the Ahmadiyya teachings are distinct from the beliefs held by most mainstream Muslims, who deny the crucifixion of Jesus and believe that he ascended bodily to heaven, and will, according to Islamic literary sources, return before the end of time.

Ahmadis believe the prophecies surrounding the second advent of the messiah Jesus were fulfilled in the likeness and personality of Mīrzā G̲h̲ulām Aḥmad, who initiated the foundation of the Ahmadiyya movement.

== Overview ==
According to Ahmadiyya beliefs, a literal interpretation of the miracles performed by ʿĪsā (Jesus) in the Qurʾān (such as creating birds and bringing back the dead to life) is inconsistent with the Quran and attributes a semi-divine status to Jesus. This understanding is replaced with a hermeneutic interpretation of the Qurʾānic verses on account of these miracles. For example, Jesus bringing the dead back to life is understood in the context of bringing back a 'spiritual life' to people who were spiritually dead.

Ahmadi scholars regard the contemporary Islamic interpretations relating to the Second Coming of Jesus (see Ahmadi prophetology) are inaccurate. Ahmadis believe that the expected return of an Israelite prophet after the Islamic prophet Muhammad contravenes the finality of Muhammad's prophethood. Traditional Muslims, however, hold the view that in his second coming - Jesus son of Mary will come as "just ruler" rather than in a prophetic capacity.

The ḥadīth prophecies of Jesus are understood in the Ahmadiyya view to be interchangeably linked with the prophecies of the coming of the Mahdi. Ahmadiyya believes that both the terms, Jesus Son of Mary and Mahdi (as used in Islamic hadith and eschatological literature), designate two titles for the same person.

== History ==
Ahmad, in his treatise Jesus in India (Urdu: Masih Hindustan Mein), proposed that Jesus survived crucifixion and travelled to India after his apparent death in Jerusalem.

The views of Jesus having travelled to India had been put forth prior to Mirza Ghulam Ahmed's publication, most notably by Nicolas Notovitch in 1894. Mirza Ghulam Ahmad expressly rejected the theory of a pre-crucifixion visit that Notovitch had proposed, arguing instead that Jesus's travels to India took place after surviving crucifixion.

The first response in English to Ahmad's writings came in a book by Howard Walter, an Urdu-speaking American pastor in Lahore, The Ahmadiyya Movement (1918). Walter, like later scholars, identified the Islamic version of the Barlaam and Josaphat story as the primary of Ahmad's evidence despite the fact that the four chapters of his book are arranged around evidence from the Gospels, the Quran and hadith, medical literature and historical records–respectively.

In his writings Mirza Ghulam Ahmad elaborated that the Roza Bal tomb in Srinagar, that is said by locals in the Srinagar region to contain the grave of a holy Jewish saint known as Yuz Asaf, is the tomb of Jesus of Nazareth.

The teaching was further researched by Ahmadi missionaries. Kamal ud-Din and Khwaja Nazir Ahmad (1952), who added to Notovitch's theory of his first earlier visit.

Although the material of Notovitch and Ahmad has been refuted by notable historians, such as the Indologist Günter Grönbold (1985) and Norbert Klatt (1988), it has been supported by others such as the archaeologist Fida Hassnain and the writer Holger Kersten.

=== Other publications ===
Ahmadi Muslims have published extensively on the topic of Jesus' natural death expanding upon Mirza Ghulam Ahmad's work in light of newer archeological discoveries and historical research. In 1978, Mirza Nasir, the third Khalifa of the Ahmadiyya movement, travelled to London where the international conference of Jesus' Deliverance from the cross was held at the Commonwealth Institute in Kensington. This was attended by a number of scholars and academics who had presented papers discussing the circumstances surrounding the crucifixion of Jesus, in which the Ahmadiyya viewpoint regarding the death of Jesus was presented. Nasir Ahmad's lecture discussed the subject of Jesus' survival from death upon the cross, his travel to the east, the Unity of God and the status of Muhammad.

In 2003, the viewpoint of Roza Bal being Jesus' tomb was covered in a BBC documentary by Richard Denton, Did Jesus Die?. Jesus' possible travels to India are also discussed in a 2008 documentary Jesus in India by Paul Davids.

== Death of Jesus ==
The Ahmadiyya movement advocates the notion of the survival of the crucifixion by Jesus through a mixture of biblical and quranic analyses.

=== Biblical sources ===
1. Jesus had prophesied that his fate would be like that of Jonah (the story of Jonah is one of survival).
2. Jesus was placed on the cross for only a few hours. Death by crucifixion usually takes several days. While he was on the cross his legs were left intact, and not broken as was the normal procedure. This would have prevented death by respiratory distress. As blood and water were reported to have 'gushed' from the spear wound, this was sign of a beating heart.
3. Jesus prayed to be rescued from death on the cross.
4. Pilate, having sympathy for Jesus, secretly devised to save him by setting his Crucifixion shortly before Sabbath day.
5. The Gospel of John records that Nicodemus brought myrrh and aloes. These healing plants, particularly aloe plants, are considered medicinal and applied to wounds. It would make little sense applying them to a dead body.
6. According to the Bible "He that is hanged is accursed of God."; something Paul imputed to Jesus. However, since the word "curse" would signify a satanic connection, divine antipathy and displeasure, spiritual impurity, faithlessness and disobedience to God; Jesus' being from God and the beloved of God, does not allow for him to have become accursed at any moment and therefore for him to have died on a cross.
7. After he had awoken from his swoon ("resurrection"), Jesus bared his wounds to Thomas, showing he did not have a supernatural, resurrected body, but a wounded human body. He was also seen in the flesh by a large number of his followers, baring the same wounds that he had suffered from his ordeal on the Cross.
8. After his wounds had sufficiently healed Jesus left the tomb and met some of his disciples and had his food with them and walked from Jerusalem to Galilee.
9. In his post-crucifixion appearances, Jesus left the tomb in the darkness of night; he appears to have been moving away from the source of danger; he showed himself only to his disciples, people whom he trusted and not the general public; and met them under the cover of darkness at night. This behaviour is uncharacteristic of one who had just miraculously succeeded in defying death at the hands of his enemies, having been given a new eternal life with an immortal physical body, and is more consistent with one who had just survived it and was avoiding their (that is both the government agencies and the public) notice lest he be recaptured.
10. Jesus stated that he was sent only for the "lost sheep of the house of Israel" and prophesied that he would go to seek out the Lost Ten Tribes of Israel (residing beyond the Palestine region). The Jews of Jesus's time believed that the Lost Tribes of Israel had become dispersed in different lands.
11. When Joseph requested Jesus' body from the cross, Pilate asked a centurion if Jesus was already dead. The centurion confirmed that Jesus was already dead. This centurion was a believer that Jesus was the son of God.
12. There are no accounts in the gospel of Jesus ascending into the heavens, aside from accounts that were absent from the earliest written gospels.

=== Quranic sources ===
Ahmadiyyas state that there are at least 30 verses of the Quran that suggest that Jesus did not ascend to Heaven but instead died a natural death on Earth. The verses in Chapter Al-Nisa (4:157-158) indicate that Jesus did not die on the Cross - but rather that God had "raised" Jesus unto God Himself (not into heaven).

[4:157-158] And their saying, 'We did kill the Messiah, Jesus, son of Mary, the Messenger of Allah;' whereas they slew him not, nor crucified him, but he was made to appear to them like one crucified; and those who differ therein are certainly in a state of doubt about it; they have no definite knowledge thereof, but only follow a conjecture; and they did not convert this conjecture into a certainty;

On the contrary, Allah raised him to Himself. And Allah is Mighty, Wise.

As the Quran speaks of God being Omnipresent in the Earth and in the hearts of mankind, God's existence is not to be misconstrued as being confined to the Heavens alone, making any bodily movement towards God impossible. Ahmadis interpret the Arabic word raised in these verses to mean "exalted". In other words, Jesus' spiritual rank and status was raised to come closer to God as opposed to him dying the accursed death which his adversaries had wished for.

To further support the view of Jesus having died a mortal death, Ahmadis use the following verse in the Quran 5:76:

[5:75] The Messiah, son of Mary, was only a Messenger; surely Messengers the like unto him had passed away before him. And his mother was a truthful woman. They both used to eat food. See how We explain the Signs for their good, and see how they are turned away.

In the preceding verse, Jesus is compared to the previous Messengers – all of whom had died a natural death and none of whom had ascended bodily to Heaven.

From the following verse in Al-Imran and Al-Anbiya, the Quran clarifies that all messengers before Muhammad, including Jesus, had died:

[3:145] And Muhammad is only a Messenger. Verily, all Messengers have passed away before him. If then he die or be slain, will you turn back on your heels?...

[21:8-9] And We sent none as Messengers before thee (Muhammed) but men to whom We sent revelations. So ask the people of the Reminder, if you know not.

And We did not give them bodies that ate no food, nor were they to live for ever.

[21:34] And We made no mortal before thee (Muhammed) to live on forever.

=== Hadith accounts ===
To illustrate the death of Jesus, Ahmadiyya scholars use references to various Islamic hadith. For example,

If Jesus and Moses had been alive, they would have had no choice but to follow me. [Kathir vol II, p 245 and al yawaqit wal Jawahir, part 2, page 24]

Jesus son of Mary lived for 120 years, and I see myself as only entering upon the beginning of the sixties. [Kanz al Ummal, part 6, p.120]

As Muhammad had lived and died after some 60 years, Jesus must also have died. In other words, as Muhammad had died, this states that there likewise was a death of Jesus.

During the Mi'raj, Muhammad had also seen Jesus in the second heaven along with John the Baptist. Thus, because Islam believes the dead cannot dwell amongst the living, it can only indicate that Jesus must also be dead.

== Second Coming of Jesus ==
The Ahmadiyya movement interprets the prophecised Second Coming of Jesus as being of a person "similar to Jesus" (mathīl-i ʿIsā), rather than that of Jesus of Nazareth himself. Mirza Ghulam Ahmad professed that the prophecy in traditional religious texts were greatly misunderstood to interpret that Jesus of Nazareth himself would return.

Ahmadis consider that the founder of the movement, in both his teachings and character as well as his situation and struggles, was likewise a circumstantial representation of the situation and struggles of Jesus.

== Universal prophethood ==
Adherents of the Ahmadiyya movement assert that the expected arrival of a latter day Messiah is represented across all major faiths. The prophecy of the messiah historically diverged into several theories and distinct interpretations which filtered across through the world's religious movements. The original Messianic prophecy nonetheless, only referred to a single Messiah. As such, Ahmadis declare that the Messiah for all major world faiths and mankind has been unified by the advent of a single Promised Messiah (Mirza Ghulam Ahmad).

Ahmadi's believe that God will cause all world faiths to gradually fade away and gravitate towards the Ahmadiyya faith; that such a process will follow a correlative pattern of circumstances and take a similar amount of time as what it took for Christianity to rise to dominance (e.g. roughly 300 years – Seven Sleepers).

== Contention with mainstream Islamic beliefs ==
The Encyclopedia of Islam states that the post-crucifixion journey of Jesus towards the East and his natural death as an aspect of Ahmadi belief is one of three primary tenets that distinguish Ahmadi teachings from general Islamic ones, and that it has provoked a fatwa against the movement.

=== Last of the Prophets / Seal of the Prophets ===
Contemporary Muslim scholars argue that no prophet can come after Muhammed based upon abstractions from the hadith and this is the principal reason for rejecting and advocating persecution against the movement.

Ahmadi scholars use hadith and the quranic sources that indicate these strictly rigid ideologies are a fallacy of misplaced concreteness. The following hadith for instance illustrates the context of when Muhammad had declared himself to be the "last of the prophets", with the same breath he had also declared his mosque as the "last" of the mosques.

Ayesha narrated that the Prophet (Allah's prayer and salvation be upon him) said : "I am the last of the Prophet and my mosque is the last of the mosques of the Prophets. The most rightful of the mosque that may be visited and for which the vigours of the journey may be borne are the Masjid Haram and my mosque; and a Salah in my mosque is more excellent than a salah in any other mosque by one thousand times, except the Masjid Haram."

(Reported by al-Bazzar and authenticated by Sheikh Albani in Sahih Targhib No. 1175)

This hadith implicates the rhetoric of Muhammad being the "last" in the absolute sense. If for instance Muhammad declared his mosque as being "last" of the mosques by the same interpretation this would have invalidated all subsequent mosques that have ever been built after his advent.

The Ahmadiyya understanding of the term Khatam an-Nabiyyin (Seal of Prophets) with reference to Muhammad, establishes that a prophet cannot come after Muhammad from outside the Islamic dispensation. In other words, one whose prophethood which is independent of Muhammad cannot develop a new faith.

Contemporary Muslims interpret from the hadith the notion of Jesus's actual physical return in person after the advent of Muhammad. According to the Quran, Jesus' revelation was addressed for the Israelites. Since Jesus had received his revelation independently of Muhammad, this would conversely violate the Seal of Prophethood of Muhammed altogether.

Thus Ahmadis regard that, as Ghulam Ahmad was only a follower and reviver of the original Islamic faith, his claim of being a subordinate prophet (in the likeness of Jesus being a subordinate prophet) does not in any way violate the Seal of Prophets (Muhammad).

=== Finality of prophethood ===
The claim that Mirza Ghulam was a prophet forms a point of contention with mainstream Islam, as it is considered a violation of the quranic and hadith teachings of Muhammad. In particular, contemporary Islamic scholars view the Ahmadiyya belief as a contradiction with the verse in the Quran, Chapter 33 (The Combined Forces), verse 40:

Muhammad is not the father of [any] one of your men, but [he is] the Messenger of Allah and Seal of the prophets. And ever is Allah, of all things, Knowing.

=== Farewell sermon ===
In his Farewell Sermon, delivered just prior to his death, Muhammad warned his followers and all mankind with the following message:

O People! No Prophet or apostle will come after me and no new faith will be born. Reason well, therefore O People! and understand words that I convey to you. I leave behind me two things, the Qur'an and the Sunnah and if you follow these you will never go astray.

The Ahmadiyya movement interpret the hadith context of "Last of the Prophets" to signify the "Very Best" and "Most Exalted Law Giver Prophet" among all the Prophets. The farewell sermon had indicated only that no prophet would come immediately after Muhammad had died.

The movement consider the literal interpretation of the term "finality" that is zealously constrained by the mainstream Islamic view, completely paradoxes their own views of the hadith concerning the second advent of Jesus. In the manner that the Islamic mainstream views that Jesus himself is expected to physically return in the latter days from Heaven, it becomes implausible to also presume that it is absolutely impossible for any prophet to come after Muhammad.

== Consensus of companions of Muhammad on Jesus' death ==
Ahmadi scholars state that when Muhammad died, the Sahaba were grieved. Umar, angered and upset, took out a sword, and said that he would kill anyone who said Muhammad is dead. At this instance Abu Bakar quoted:

[3:144] And Muhammad is but a messenger; the messengers passed away before him; if then he dies or is killed will you turn back upon your heels? And whoever turns back upon his heels, he will by no means do harm to Allah in the least and Allah will reward the grateful."

The Ahmadiyya movement believe that no companion ever stated Jesus is alive in heaven. Nor that he would come physically in the Second Coming. As such according to the quranic verses, Jesus could only have died a natural death (and not have died on the Cross).

== Fulfilment of messianic prophecies ==
Mirza Ghulam Ahmad regarded the prophecies and concepts in hadith and Bible concerning his advent in an entirely metaphorical light. As an example, in his publication, Izala-e-Auham Mirza Ghulam Ahmad stated:

The second special aspect of the prophecy, which relates to the advent of the Promised Messiah, is that he will break the cross, slaughter the swine and kill the one-eyed Antichrist. Every disbeliever who is touched by his breath will die instantly. The spiritual interpretation of this special aspect is that the Promised Messiah will crush under his feet all the glory of the religion of the cross, that he will destroy with the weapon of conclusive arguments those who are afflicted with shamelessness like swine, and who devour filth like pigs, and that he will wipe out with the sword of clear proofs the opposition of those who possess only the eye of the world and are bereft of the eye of the faith in place of which they have only an unsightly taint. Not only such one-eyed ones, but also every disbeliever who views Islam with contempt will suffer spiritual extinction through the glorious breath of Messianic reasoning. In short all these signs are metaphoric, the significance of which has been fully revealed to me. Some may not appreciate it at this time but after waiting for sometime, and despairing altogether of the hopes that they now entertain, all of them will accept it." (Izala-e-Auham, Volume 3, Pages 141-143)

=== Battle against Dajjal (Anti-Christ) ===
Mirza Ghulam Ahmad elaborated on the depictions of Antichrist as prophecised in the Bible and the hadith concerning the emergence of the Dajjal. These are interpreted in Ahmadiyya teachings, in metaphorical terms - to denote a group of nations centred upon falsehood. The reference to the Dajjal is personified as a unified system - a chain of deceptive ideas indicating it's chains of unity as a class (instead of any single person).

The defeat of the Dajjal, was by force of reason and argument and by the warding off of its mischief through the ideologies and teachings of the Messiah, rather than by way of any physical warfare; with the Dajjal's power and influence gradually disintegrating and ultimately allowing for the recognition and worship of God along Islamic ideals to prevail throughout the world.

=== Breaking of the cross ===
The Islamic hadith describe that Jesus would, upon his second coming, "Break the Cross". Ahmadis interpret this to mean that he will "make plain the error of the creed of the cross". Ghulam Ahmad's teachings of Jesus, being a mortal man who survived crucifixion and died a natural death upon earth, is considered as a testimony of the prophecy being fulfilled.

Ahmadis believe the followers of Christianity will gradually come to accept the same teaching and this will repeal the central doctrines of the divinity of Jesus, Atonement and Resurrection. In turn, the traditional Christian reverence for the cross and doctrine of the immortality of Jesus will become untenable.

=== Ending of wars ===
In 1894, Ghulam Ahmad had declared that the contemporary Islamists views of Jihad of the sword and Holy War was a fundamental misrepresentation of Islam, that was invented during the Dark Ages. He advocated for these false beliefs to be ended in their entirety.

The Ahmadiyya Movement believe that any military jihad in Islam is permitted only and exclusively for the defence of religious freedom and in very strictly defined circumstances (not exclusive only to Islam). Those circumstances did not exist at the present time of British rule in India. As a result, early Ahmadis had faced virulent opposition from extremist groups, some of whom protested a conspiracy that Ghulam Ahmad had been put in place as a pacifist by the British Government to appease Muslims. Ahmadis believe that in the modern era, the "Jihad of the pen" (peaceful intellectual reasoning) is the only potent way of espousing and spreading the Islamic teaching.

Accordingly, as per scriptural prophecies in the hadith relating to the Messiah ending of wars, the movement regard this declaration has deprecated "Jihad of the sword" and consider the prophecies in the hadith relating to ending of religious wars had been fulfilled by Ghulam Ahmad teachings.

== Journey from Judea to India ==
According to Ghulam Ahmad, (and further developed by the next generation of Ahmadi writers such as Khwaja Nazir Ahmad in 1952), Jesus taught the message of Jewish messianism to his disciples and to the people living in Judea. After surviving his ordeal on the cross, Jesus remained in Judea for a short time before leaving from there. Jesus was declared a criminal and therefore, decided to leave Judea with his mother Mary, his wife Mary Magdalene and his apostle Thomas the Apostle. Thereafter, Jesus traveled toward Asia.

=== From Judea to Iraq ===
With these three companions, he went first to Iraq. Here he met his disciple, Ananias. He met his rival Paul who later became a Christian. In Nusaybin, he got another tension at the hands of a cruel king. He was arrested again. Prophet Jesus along with his mother performed some miracles and impressed the king. The king gave him permission to go to the kingdom of Parthia. There was a strong Jewish community living there.

=== Iraq to Iran and Afghanistan ===
From Iraq, he went to Iran where he was honourably received by the Persian Jews. Five centuries before Cyrus the Great had conquered Babylon and the Jews were freed. Many of the Jews went to live in Iran and were known as Persian Jews. Jesus preached here and went on to Bactria (Afghanistan). At that time, Persia was a great center of Judaism. He professed the advent of the coming of a great prophet named Muhammad to his fellowmen in these areas specially in the area of Afghanistan. He met with the first king of Parthia who honored him. The Pashtun people have a tradition in their royal and non-royal functions and consider themselves to be the sons of Children of Israel. Many of these Persian Jews who had been receiving the teachings from Jesus proselytized to Muslims at the time of Muhammad and accepted his call. Qais Abdur Rashid, his name is this and the original was Kish.

=== Kashmir, Tibet and India ===
==== Reasons for coming to India ====
According to Ahmadiyya sources (Islam International Publications Ltd.) the Tribes of Israel who had migrated to eastern countries seeing the attraction in Hinduism and Buddhism had themselves become Hindus and Buddhists. They subsequently became unaware of their religion. Jesus and Thomas the Apostle later arrived in India to restore the Abrahamic teachings to these tribes.

==== Jesus meets Shalivahana ====
According to a late section of the Hindu Bhavishya Purana (written after 1739), Jesus met a Hindu king, Shalivahana.

The king along with his companions went to the peak of the Himalayas to meet a man who was a dignified person of fair complexion in white clothes sitting in the mountain. When the king asked who he was, the man replied "I am the Messiah, born of a virgin."

He told the king he had come from a far off place where he has suffered at the hands of his people. When the king asked what religion he adhered to, he said that his religion was of peace, love and purity of heart. The king was impressed, so he paid homage to him.

== Tomb of Jesus ==
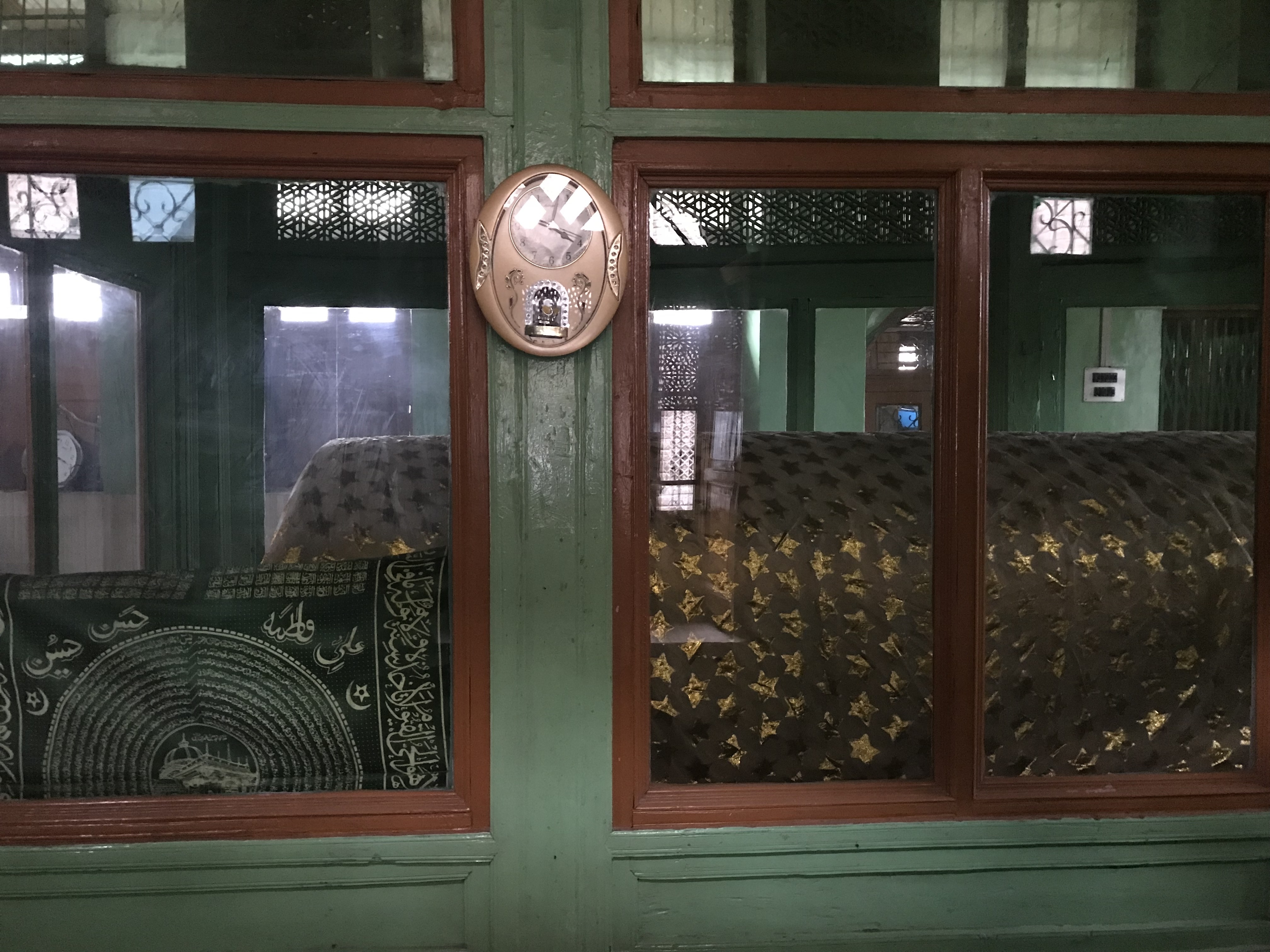
Interior of Roza Bal shrine

During his initial research into Jesus' death, Mirza Ghulam Ahmad postulated that Jesus may have been buried in either Galilee or Syria. After investigating further he eventuality uncovered evidence to conclude that the tomb of Jesus was located at the Roza Bal shrine in Srinagar, Kashmir. Based upon this evidence, Ahmadis today believe the tomb of Jesus is located in the Srinagar region of Kashmir.

Ghulam Ahmad, and later Ahmadi writers have cited various evidences for identifying the grave as that of Jesus: The Bhavishya Purana Official Decree, The Glass Mirror, Tarikh-i-Kashmir, Qisa-shazada, The Garden of Solomon (Bagh-i-Sulaiman) by Mir Saadullah Shahabadi (1780 A.D.), Wajeez-ut-Tawarikh, Ikmal-ud-Din (962 AD), Ain-ul-Hayat, The Acts of Thomas, Takhat Sulaiman (Throne of Solomon, a hill in Kashmir), Tarikh-i-Kabir, and Rauzat-us-Safa. Ahmadis believe that these sources testify to the view that Yuz Asaf and Jesus are the same person.

Haji Mohi-ud-din Miskin, writing in 1902, three years after Mirza Ghulam Ahmad in 1899, is the first historian to mention that "some" connect the shrine of Yuz Asaf as the grave of Hazrat Isa Rooh-Allah (Jesus the Spirit of God).

The importance of the shrine has been preserved in the memory of the descendants of the ancient Israelites to this day. They call the shrine "The tomb of Hazrat Issa Sahib", "The Tomb of Prophet Jesus (Isa)".

The building constructed is named "Roza Bal" or "Rauza Bal". "Rauza" is generally a term used to denote the tomb of a celebrated personality, i.e. noble, wealthy, or saintly. A local scholar and supporter of the theory, Fida Hassnain, has claimed that the tomb is arranged with the feet pointing in the direction of Jerusalem, and claimed that this is in accordance with Jewish tradition.

Ahmadis give the Yuz Asaf enshrined in the tomb the epithet Shahzada Nabi, "Prophet Prince". The majority Srinagar Sunni Muslim community reject the Ahmadiyya claims that the tomb is that of Jesus and consider this viewpoint as blasphemous.

=== Tomb of Mary ===
Muslim and Persian documents — the Tafir-Ibn-I-Jarir, the Kanz-al-Ummal, and the Rauzat-us-Safa — have references that contribute to the theory of Jesus' escape. Some of these also mention that Jesus was accompanied by Mary, and there is another burial place in Pakistan, along his theoretical route to Kashmir, known as Mai Mari da Ashtan, or "resting place of Mother Mary."

== See also ==
- Apocalypse of Peter
- Basilidians
- Gospel of Barnabas
- Gospel of Basilides
- Islamic views on Jesus' death
- Holger Kersten
- Substitution hypothesis
- Swoon hypothesis
- Unknown years of Jesus

== Bibliography ==
- Faruqi, Nisar Ahmed (1983). "The Promised Messiah". Ahmadiyyat in the Service of Islam. Lahore: Ahmadiyya Anjuman Ishaat. ISBN 0-913321-00-1. Archived from the original on 2011-09-28.
- Houtsma, M. Th. (1913). "Ahmedia". In Houtsma, M. Th.; Arnold, T. W.; Basset, R. (eds.). Encyclopedia of Islam. Vol. 1. Leiden: Brill.
- Korbel, Jonathan; Preckel, Claudia (2016). "Ghulām Aḥmad al-Qādiyānī: The Messiah of the Christians—Peace upon Him—in India (India, 1908)". In Bentlage, Björn; Eggert, Marion; Krämer, Hans-Martin; Reichmuth, Stefan (eds.). Religious Dynamics under the Impact of Imperialism and Colonialism. Numen Book Series. Vol. 154. Leiden: Brill Publishers. pp. 426–442. doi:10.1163/9789004329003_034. ISBN 978-90-04-32511-1.
- Leirvik, Oddbjørn (2010). "The Christology of the Ahmadiyya Movement". Images of Jesus Christ in Islam (2nd ed.). London: Continuum International. pp. 129–132. ISBN 978-1-4411-7739-1.
