= Roza Bal =

Shrine located in the Khanyar quarter in downtown area of Srinagar in Kashmir

Coordinates: 34°05′39″N 74°48′59″E

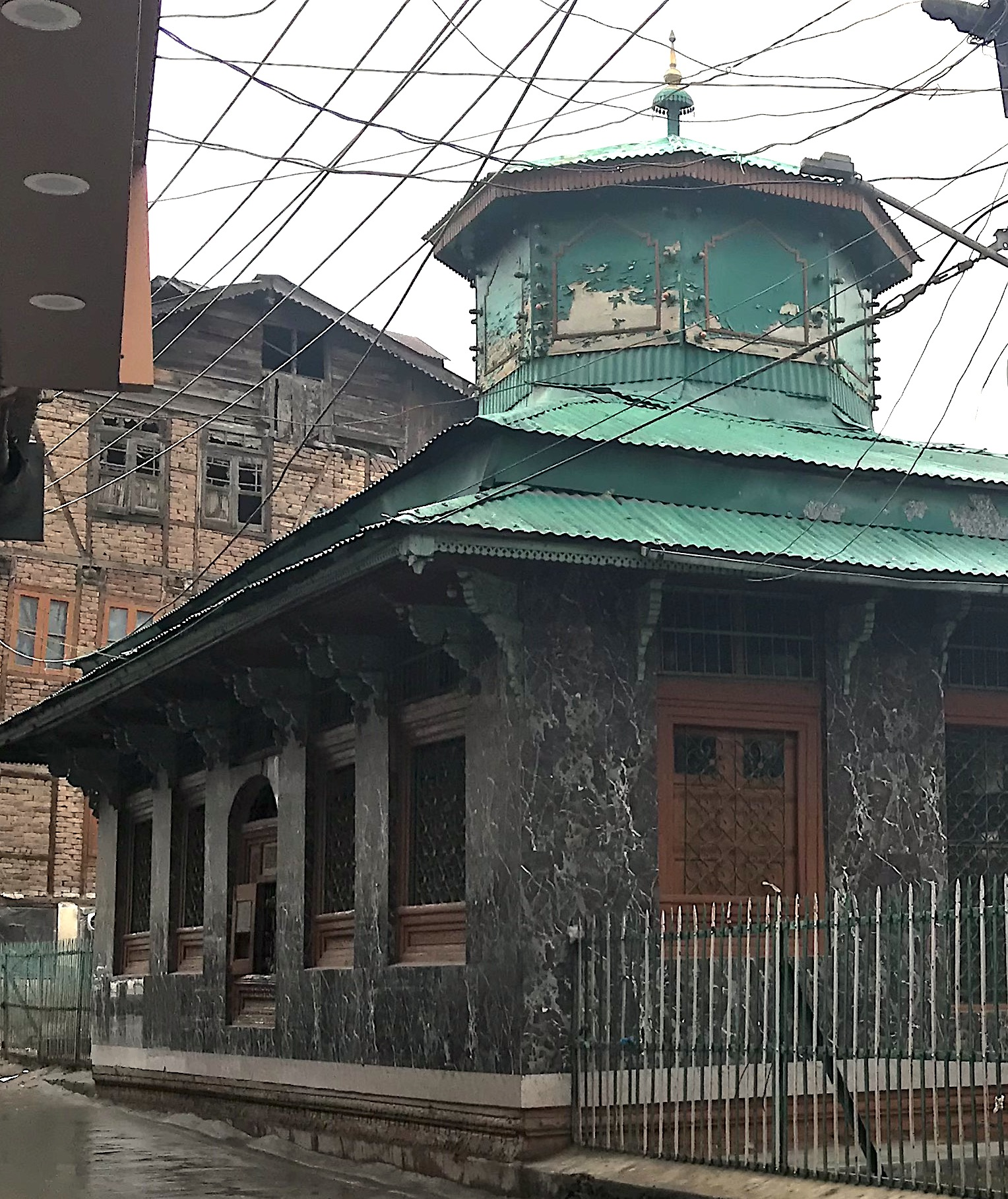
The Roza Bal shrine in Srinagar, Kashmir, India, believed by Ahmadi Muslims to be the tomb of Jesus.

The Roza Bal or Rouza Bal is a shrine located in the Khanyar quarter in downtown area of Srinagar in Jammu and Kashmir, India. The word roza means tomb, the word bal means place. Locals believe a sage is buried here, Yuz Asaf, alongside another Muslim holy man, Mir Sayyid Naseeruddin.

The shrine was relatively unknown until the founder of the Ahmadiyya movement, Mirza Ghulam Ahmad, asserted in 1899 that it is actually the tomb of Jesus. This view is maintained by Ahmadis today, though it is rejected by the local caretakers of the shrine, one of whom said "the theory that Jesus is buried anywhere on the face of the earth is blasphemous to Islam."

== Building ==
The structure stands in front of a Muslim cemetery. It consists of a low rectangular building on a raised platform, surrounded by railings at the front and an entry. Within is a shrine to Youza Asouph. The building also houses the burial tomb of a Shia Muslim saint, Mir Sayyid Naseeruddin, a descendant of Imam Ali-Rida, 8th Imam of the Shia Muslims whose shrine is in Mashhad.

The structure was previously maintained by the local community, but is now maintained by a board of directors consisting of Sunni Muslims. According to Kashmiri writer Fida Hassnain, a supporter of the Ahmadiyya views of Jesus, the tomb contains a rock carving that is said to show feet bearing crucifixion wounds and the body is buried according to what Hassnain considers are the Jewish tradition of directions and not according to the Islamic tradition. Academic reception of Hassnain's works has been highly critical - academics dismissing these claims includes Günter Grönbold, Wilhelm Schneemelcher, Norbert Klatt, Per Beskow, and Gerald O'Collins.

== History ==
=== Buddhist and Hindu period ===
There is no record of the shrine during Kashmir's Buddhist period, nor during the Kashmir Sultanate (1346–1586) when many Buddhist temples were converted into mosques, such as the Shankaracharya Temple or "Throne of Solomon."

=== Muhammad Dedamari, 1747 ===
The shrine is first mentioned in the Waqi'at-i-Kashmir (Story of Kashmir, published 1747), also known as the Tarikh Azami (History by Azam) by the Khwaja Muhammad Azam Didamari, a local Srinagar Sufi writer. Muhammed Azam states that the tomb is of a foreign prophet and prince, Yuzasuf, or in modern local Kashimiri transcription Youza Asouph. The name may derive from the Urdu "Yuzasaf" in the legend of Balauhar and Yuzasaf, Yuzasaf being a name for Gautama Buddha. Yuzasaf occurs as a spelling in the Rasail Ikhwan al-Safa of the Brethren of Purity and other sources. David Marshall Lang (1960) notes that the connection of the Buddhist Yuzasaf with Kashmir in part results from a printing error in the Bombay Arabic edition referencing the legend of the Wisdom of Balahvar which makes its hero prince Yuzasaf die in "Kashmir" (Arabic: كشمير) by confusion with Kushinara (Pali: كوشينر), the traditional place of the original Buddha's death.

=== Court case 1770 ===
A court case was brought mentioning the shrine in 1184AH/1770AD:

The Seal of The Justice of Islam Mullah Fazil 1184-A.H. Verdict: Now this Court, after obtaining evidence, concludes that during the reign of Raja Gopadatta, who built and repaired many temples, especially the Throne of Solomon, Yuz Asaph came to the Valley. Prince by descent, he was pious and saintly and had given up earthly pursuits. He spent all his time in prayers and meditation. The people of Kashmir, having become idolators, after the great flood of Noah, the God Almighty, sent Yuz Asaph as a prophet to the people of Kashmir. He proclaimed the oneness of God till he passed away. Yuz‐Asaph was buried at Khanyar on the banks of the lake and his shrine is known as Roza Bal. In the year 871 A.H. Syed Nasir-ud-Din, a descendant of Imam Musa-Raza, was also buried besides the grave of Yuz Asaph. Orders – Since the shrine is visited by devotees, both high and common, and since the applicant, Rehman Khan, is the hereditary custodian of the shrine, it is ordered that he be entitled to receive the offerings made at the shrine as before, and no one else shall have any right to such offerings. Given under our hand, 11th Jamad-ud-sani, 1184 A.H" (translation by Fida Hassnain 1988)

Hassnain's translation follows Ghulam Ahmad in dividing the name of Yuzasaf, found in the Bilhawar and Yuzasaf tradition about Gautama Buddha, into two components, "Yuz Asaf." Yuzasaf, Arabic Yūdhasaf or Būdhasaf, is derived from the Sanskrit Bodhisattva. The Sanskrit word was changed to Bodisav in Persian texts in the 6th or 7th century, then to Budhasaf or Yudasaf in an 8th-century Arabic document (from Arabic initial "b" ﺑ to "y" ﻳ by duplication of a dot in handwriting).

=== Indo-Pakistan War, 1965 ===
In the aftermath of the Indo-Pakistani War of 1965 and continuing Hindu-Muslim and Muslim-Muslim tensions and incidents the Ziarat Rozabal was desecrated and the grave dug up on 27 October 1965. Indian columnist Praveen Swami (2006) identified the culprits as a "stay-back cell" of Pakistani operatives, but this is not confirmed by other sources.

== Ahmadiyya claims ==
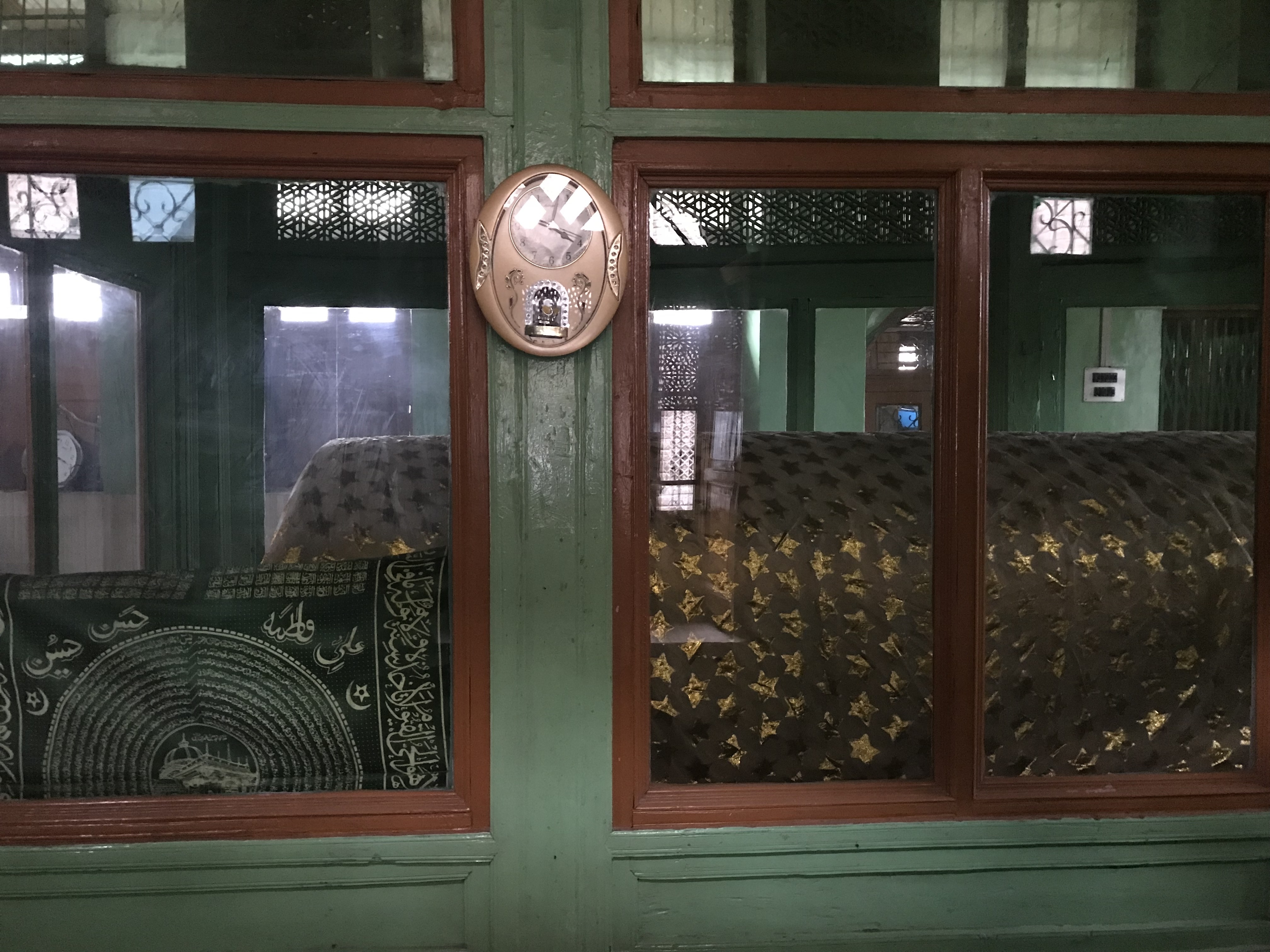
Interior of Roza Bal shrine.

=== Mirza Ghulam Ahmad ===
The founder of Ahmadiyya, Mirza Ghulam Ahmad, inferring from the Verse 23:50 of the Quran, believed that the only occasion in the life of Jesus, son of Mary, that his life was seriously threatened, when an attempt was made to kill him by the cross. The Quran saying that "We...prepared an abode for them in an elevated part of the earth, being a place of quiet and security, and watered with running springs"; Ahmad says, may very fittingly apply to the Valley of Kashmir.

In his book Jesus in India, he elaborately claimed that Roza Bal was the tomb of Jesus (Urdu 1899, English 1944 مسیح ہندوستان میں Masih Hindustan-mein). The book was fully published in 1908, and the first complete English translation in 1944. Ahmad had separately advocated the view that Jesus did not die by crucifixion, but travelled to the Indian subcontinent and died there at age 120. Per Beskow states that Ghulam Ahmad separated Yuzasaf into two components Yuz and Asaf, interpreted Yuz as Jesus and Asaf (the Hebrew for gather) as signifying "Jesus the gatherer".

The Ahmadiyya writer Khwaja Nazir Ahmad's Jesus in Heaven on Earth (1952) developed Ghulam Ahmad's ideas. There are ruins of a Hindu temple near Srinagar where Ghulam Ahmad claimed Jesus had preached. Due to the lack of other western sources, the Ahmadi rely on the 3rd century apocryphal Acts of Thomas and generally post-15th century Muslim sources in their reconstruction of an eastern travel path for Jesus.

J. Gordon Melton states that having assumed the mujaddid (faith renewer) appellation in the 1880s, and having declared himself the Promised Messiah for the Christians, Ghulam Ahmad simply picked up the legend that Jesus had visited India to increase his self-identification with Jesus. Gerald O'Collins states that no historical evidence has been provided to support Ghulam Ahmad's theory that Jesus died in India. Simon Ross Valentine classifies the theory as a legend and considers the burial of Jesus in Roza Bal a myth in the scale of the legend of Joseph of Arimathea taking the Holy Grail to Britain. Paul C. Pappas states that from a historical perspective, the Ahmadi identification of Yuzasaf with Jesus was derived from legends and documents which include a number of clear historical errors (e.g. confusing the reign of Gondophares) and that "it is almost impossible to identify Yuz Asaf with Jesus".

Ghulam Ahmad's theory that Jesus died in India is distinct from the 1894 suggestion of Nicolas Notovitch that Jesus travelled to India in his earlier years (before the start of his ministry) during the unknown years of Jesus and Ghulam Ahmad specifically disagreed with Notovitch. Notovitch's claims to have found a manuscript about Jesus' travels to India have been totally discredited by modern scholarship as a hoax. Notovitch later confessed to having fabricated his evidence. Modern scholars generally hold that in general there is no historical basis to substantiate any of the claims of the travels of Jesus to India.

=== 20th century ===
==== Khwaja Nazir Ahmad ====
After Notovich and Ahmad the next widely noticed text was the 1908 The Aquarian Gospel of Jesus Christ – Transcribed from The Book of God's Remembrance (Akashic Records), which Levi H. Dowling (1844–1911) claimed he had transcribed from lost "Akashic" records.

Khwaja Nazir Ahmad, an Ahmadi missionary in Woking, developed Ghulam Ahmad's ideas in the 1940s. He also claimed that Moses was buried at Boot on Mt. Niltoop near Bandipur. His book (1952) contained a translated section of the Ikmal al-din of Shia authority Ibn Babawayh (d. 991, called "as-Saduq") where Yuzasaf (Ahmad "Yuz Asaf") is mentioned.

He compared the tree with 'Bushra' towards which he used to draw people; the spring with learning, and the birds with the people who sat around him and accepted the religion he preached. Then Yuz Asaf, after roaming about in many cities, reached that country which is called Kashmir. He travelled in it far and wide and stayed there and spent his remaining life there until death overtook him. He left the earthly body and was elevated towards the Light. But before his death, he sent for a disciple of his, Ba'bad (Thomas) by name who used to serve him and was well-versed in all matters. Translation into English from Original Arabic of Ikmal al-din of Ibn Babawayh, republished Khwaja Nazir Ahmad "Jesus in Heaven on earth" 1952 Page 362 (insertion "Thomas" not in original Ghulam Ahmad 1908 translation).

The claim that this text relates to Isa (Jesus) and not Barlaam and Josaphat originates in Ahmad's earlier 1902 use of the same text. Ahmadiyya claims that this section of the Ikmal al-din of Ibn Babawayh relates to Isa (Jesus) is rejected by Shia Muslims. The Orientalist Max Müller had already translated this section into German (1894) when refuting the claims of Nicolas Notovitch.

Ahmadi websites and print sources cite various local documents and traditions in support of Ghulam Ahmad's identification of the Srinagar shrine as Jesus's tomb. These include:
(1) Islamic versions of the legend of Barlaam and Josaphat, in Arabic Budasaf or Yuzasaf:

- Ikmal-ud-Din of Ibn Babuyah (d.962 AD) – regarded by scholars as concerning the Barlaam and Josaphat legend.
- Qisa-shazada, Qisa Shazada Yuzasaph wo hakim Balauhar (The Story of the Prince Yuzasaph and the Philosopher Balauhar) 18th–19th century Urdu version of the Book of Balauhar and Budasaf.
- The Ain-ul-Hayat of Ibn-i-Muhammad Hade Muhammad Imail, Allamah Majlisi (1616–1698)

(2) Texts mentioning Jesus (Isa)

- Rauzat-us-Safa of Mir Muhammad Bin Khawand (1417, published 1852 Bombay) – which contains a version of the legend of Abgar concerning the conversion of the king of Edessa (called Nasibain or Nisibis in Persian) in Turkey before Jesus' crucifixion. Ghulam Ahmad (Urdu, 1899, English 1978) gives a paraphrase of the original.
- Bhavishya Maha Purana (after 1739), a Hindu text with a section discussing Jesus and Mohammed, also Queen Victoria

(3) Local history of Kashmir

- A 1946 photograph of a single page purporting to be from Tarikh-i-Kashmir, (History of Kashmir) a lost history by Mullah Nadri 1420 AD, used as a source by Haidar Malik (1620s). Khwaja Nazir Ahmad printed this photograph in Jesus in Heaven on Earth (1952) The text in the photograph contains mention of Yuzasaf, but the standard text of the Mullah Nadri traditions transmitted by Haidar Malik contain no mention of Yuzasaf, and no historian cites Tarikh-i-Kashmir as containing a Yuzasaf tradition. The original page, which Ahmad tried to buy in 1946 is now lost, so no tests can be conducted to the age of the document.
- Waqiat-i-Kashmir of Muhammed Azam Didamari (1747) History of Kashmir, mention of Prince Yuzasaf
- Official Decree of 1770 court case, – identifying the two saints at the Rozabal as Yuzasaf and Sayyid Naseeruddin.
- Bagh-i-Sulaiman (The Garden of Solomon) of Mir Saadullah Shahabadi Kashmiri (1780), a history of Kashmir which comments on the other Muslim holy man buried at the Roza Bal shrine, Sayyid Naseeruddin.
- Wajeesut Tawarikh of Abdul Nabi Khanyari (1857) – History of the Sikh period of Kashmir which mentions the Rozabal as grave of Sayyid Naseeruddin and prince Yuzasaf.
- Takhat Sulaiman (Throne of Solomon), remains of a temple on hill near Dal Lake in Srinagar, Kashmir
- Tahrik-i-kabir-Kashmir, of Haji Mohiuddin, (Amritsar, Suraj Prakash Press, 1902) – the first source to mention that some believe the Roza Bal to be the tomb of Jesus (Isa), three years after Mirza Ghulam Ahmad's identification.

Pappas states that the analysis of any possible combinations of date assignment to Nazir Ahmad's theory about the travels of Jesus indicates that none of the scenarios can be consistent with the generally accepted historical dates such as the reign of Gondophares, in part because Nazir Ahmad relied on the dating methods used in the court of Zain-ul-Abidin (1423–1474).

==== Andreas Faber-Kaiser and Holger Kersten ====
In 1976 Andreas Faber-Kaiser, a Spanish UFOlogist, and in 1983 Siegfried Obermeier and Holger Kersten, two German writers on esoteric subjects, popularised the subject in Christ died in Kashmir, Christ in Kashmir and Christ Lived in India respectively. Kersten's ideas were among various expositions of the theory critiqued by Günter Grönbold in Jesus in Indien. Das Ende einer Legende (Munich, 1985). Wilhelm Schneemelcher a German theologian states that the work of Kersten (which builds on Ahmad and The Aquarian Gospel) is fantasy and has nothing to do with historical research. Gerald O'Collins an Australian Jesuit priest, states that Kersten's work is simply the repackaging of a legend for consumption by the general public.

The interpretation that the tomb is aligned East-West is found in the Ahmadi publications such as, Mirza Ghulam Ahmad's Kashti Noh and Ahmadiyya official magazines Islamic Review 1981 and Review of Religions 1983. Ahmadis claim that this is supported by the reference from Ibn Babawayh's version of the Yuzasif-Gautama Buddha story in Ikmal al-Din "Then he stretched out his legs and turned his head to the west and his face to the east. He died in this position."

==== Ahmaddiya claims in Popular media ====
Richard Denton wrote and produced a documentary for BBC Four titled Did Jesus Die? in 2004. It is narrated by Bernard Hill and features Elaine Pagels, Peter Stanford, John Dominic Crossan, Paula Fredriksen, Father Jerome Murphy-O'Connor, Tom Wright, Thierry LaCombe (French Knights Templar conspiracy theorist), Richard Andrews, James Tabor, Steve Mason, and Ahmadi editor Abdul Aziz Kashmiri. The documentary explores the survival from the cross theory and, in passing, mentions theories such as a journey to India by Jesus, with a section on the story of Yuz Asaf.

In 2007 Channel 4 showed the documentary The Hidden Story of Jesus presented by Robert Beckford, which included filming inside Roza Bal, and an interview with Fida Hassnain about the shrine and Jesus "Indian connection". Gerald O’Collins criticised several aspects of the documentary, and stated that Hassnain "showed how he lives in an odd world of fantasy and misinformation."

Around 2010 the tomb at Roza Bal began to gain popularity among western tourists as the possible tomb of Jesus. According to a 2010 BBC correspondent report, the old story may have been recently promoted by local shopkeepers who "thought it would be good for business", and its inclusion in the Lonely Planet travel guide to India helped drive the tourist business. The novel The Rozabal Line by Ashwin Sanghi makes reference to the shrine. In 2010, a 53-minute documentary was launched by the Indian film director Rai Yashendra Prasad with the name Roza Bal Shrine of Srinagar.

== Mainstream Muslims belief ==
Since mainstream Muslims, and secular historians do not accept the Ahmadiyya claims of a visit by Jesus of Nazareth to India, mainstream Muslims and scholars also reject any possibility that the Roza Bal shrine is the tomb of Jesus. After Howard Walter visited the shrine in 1913, investigating Ghulam Ahmad's claims, he reported that local Muslims were of the opinion that the shrine had previously been a Hindu grave until the 14th century when Sayyid Sharfud'-Din 'Abdur Rahman, (d. 1327 CE, popularly known as Bulbul Shah) had brought Islam to Kashmir, and declared the grave to be not of a boddhisvatta but of a Muslim saint. German indologist Günter Grönbold notes that like the Yuzasaf legend, the tomb itself is one of many sacred Buddhist and Hindu sites in Kashmir re-purposed to Islamic shrines over the course of Kashmir's history.

== See also ==
- Abba Yahiyya, leader of a 'Jesus in India' faith.
- Mai Mari da Ashtan, proposed grave of Mary, mother of Jesus, in Pakistan.
- Swoon hypothesis, ideas that Jesus did not die on the cross.
- Tomb of Jesus, proposed graves of Jesus.
- Unknown years of Jesus, ideas on what Jesus did in a time not described in the New Testament, and after supposedly surviving crucifixion.
- Yusmarg, proposed as a place Jesus stayed at in India.
