= Mai Mari da Ashtan =

Possible burial location of Mary, mother of Jesus

In recent Ahmadi Muslim belief, the Mai Mari da Ashtan (resting place of Mother Mary) is the burial place of Mary, mother of Jesus, at one extremity of Muree in Pakistan.

== Ahmadiyya belief ==
The primary book source for the association of the town of Muree with Mary is found from Mirza Ghulam Ahmad's claims. His follower Khwaja Nazir Ahmad wrote a book about it: Jesus in Heaven and Earth (1952). Inspired, German estoric writer Holger Kersten, wrote a book too: Jesus lebte in Indien (1982).

Overall, this is based on the belief of Ahmaddiyya founder Mirza Ghulam Ahmad's claims, based on his reading of various Hindu and Islamic sources that Jesus survived the crucifixion, came to India and died and is buried in Kashmir. Combining local oral and written accounts of one Yuz Asaf with the Acts of Thomas, Ahmad claimed that Jesus (whom he identified with Yuz Asaf), Thomas the Apostle (held to be Jesus' twin brother), and their mother Mary travelled to India, with Mary dying en route from Taxila at Muree and being buried at Pindi Point there. These ideas were popularised to western audiences by Paul C. Pappas in Jesus' Tomb in India: The Debate on His Death and Resurrection published by Jain Publishing Company, 1991.

The name "Mai Mari da Ashtan" means, literally, the "resting place of Mother Mary", and the site was venerated by Hindus, Muslims, and Christians locally; so much that when the British tried to have the tomb demolished in 1916, to stop people visiting it (because at the time it was next to a defence post built in 1898), public protest caused them to not proceed with the demolition. The tomb itself was renovated in the 1950s through the efforts of an Ahmaddiyya leader Khwaja Nazir Ahmad, author of Jesus in Heaven and Earth. The defence post no longer exists, and instead a television transmitter station, constructed for Pakistan Television Corporation in 1968, stands on the point.

The Ahmaddiya writer, Khwaja Nazir Ahmad, also claims that the very name of the town, Muree, named Mari in the 19th century, is derived from the name Mary. Mountaineer and local historian Farakh Ahmed Khan disputes this in his history of Muree, stating that the name "Mari" was simply the word for an enclosure of land, a dwelling area, akin to the similar Bengali word. This is rejected by locals living in Muree, arguing in favour of Mirza Ghulam Ahmad's claims. Indeed, when the British first arrived here in the 1850s to establish a new hill-station in India, Muree was still known as Mari. The spelling was changed to Muree by the British in 1875 when they established it as a hill station. The change likely occurred during the British colonial period to standardize the spelling and make it easier for English speakers to pronounce. Others claim the name change to be a conspiracy, arguing British Christians tried to cover up the town's links to Mary to keep Christianity's version of events intact.

== Rejection by scholars ==
Ahmad's original claims and readings of his sources were rejected immediately by scholars of Islam and Buddhism in his own lifetime. More recent analysis and rejections of the reading include Per Beskow in Jesus in Kashmir: Historien om en legend (1981), Günter Grönbold, in Jesus in Indien (1985) and Norbert Klatt, in Lebte Jesus in Indien?: Eine religionsgeschichtliche Klärung (1988). Even Paul C. Pappas who popularised Ahmad's claims in Jesus' Tomb in India 1991 concludes by rejecting the claims as unfounded. Khwaja Nazir Ahmad's further claims about Mary in Jesus in Heaven and Earth (1952), as found in Kersten (1982) are also rejected by these writers.

== See also ==
- Roza Bal
- Tomb of the Virgin Mary
