= Islamic views on Jesus's death =

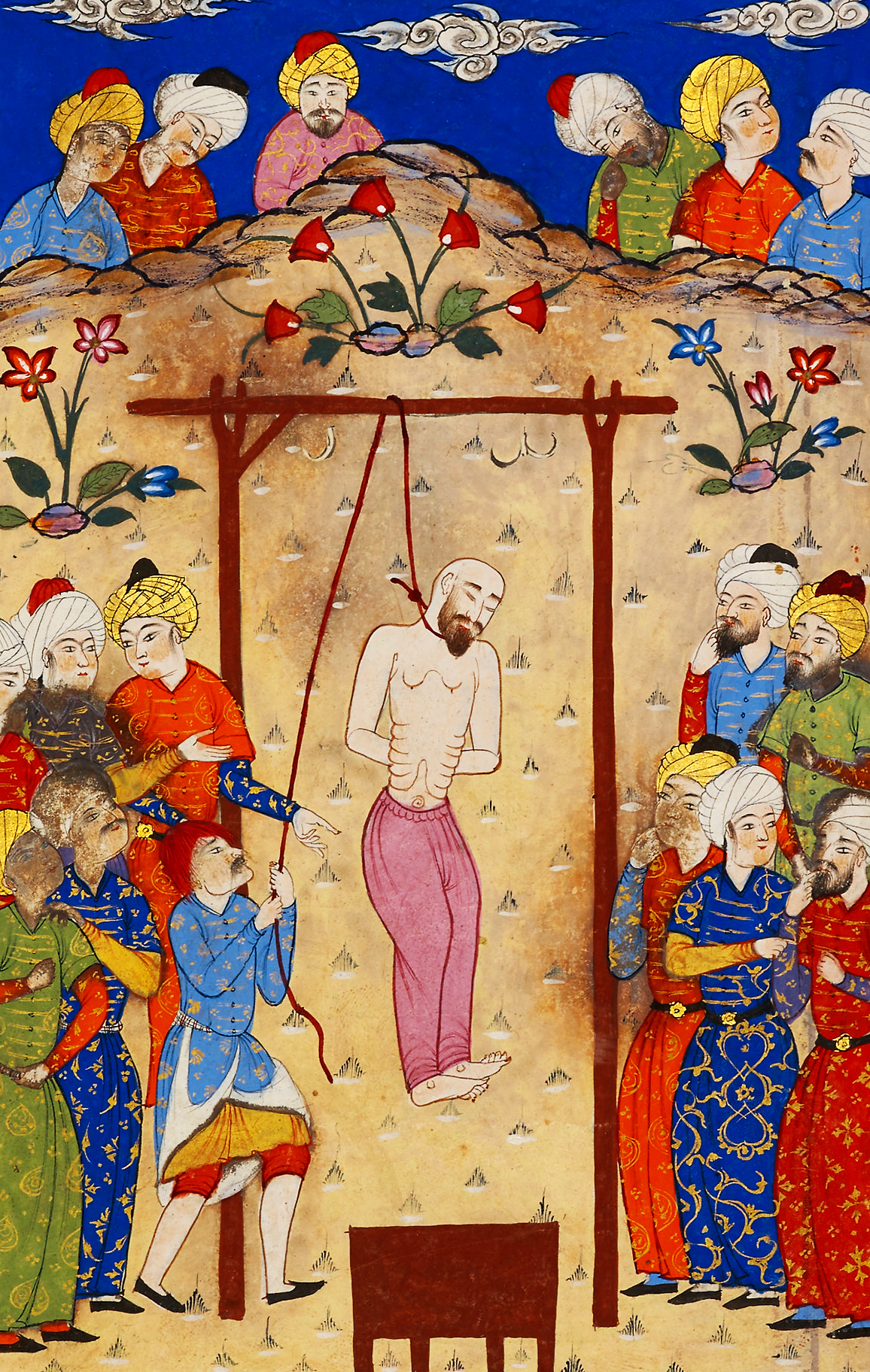
Islamic illustration of a man outwardly appearing as Jesus (ʿĪsā) being hanged by the Jews. From Stories of the Prophets, Persian manuscript, c. 1577.

The biblical account of the crucifixion, burial, and resurrection of Jesus (ʿĪsā) recorded in the Christian New Testament is traditionally rejected by the major branches of Islam, but like Christians they believe that Jesus ascended to heaven and he will, according to Islamic literary sources, return before the end of time. The various sects of Islam have different views regarding this topic; traditionally, mainstream Muslims believe that Jesus was not crucified but was bodily raised up to heaven by God, while the Ahmadi paradigm reject this belief and instead contend that Jesus survived the crucifixion, was taken off the cross alive and continued to preach in India until his natural death. However this idea is rejected as heretical by mainstream Sunni and Shia Muslims.

== Jesus' death in the Quran ==
Jesus' death is mentioned in the future sense (on the Day of Resurrection) in the Quran, and his attempted death and his ascension into Heaven in the past sense.

=== Past sense ===
Depending on the interpretation of the following Quranic verses (Quran 4:157-4:158), Islamic scholars and commentators of the Quran have abstracted different opinions and conflicting conclusions regarding the death of Jesus. He was replaced as Jesus and the executioners thought the victim was Jesus, causing everyone to believe that Jesus was crucified. A third explanation could be that Jesus was nailed to a cross, but as his soul is immortal he did not "die" or was not "crucified" [to death]; it only appeared so. In opposition to the second and third foregoing proposals, yet others maintain that God does not use deceit and therefore they contend that the crucifixion just did not happen:

That they (The Jews) said (in boast), "We killed Christ Jesus the son of Mary, the Messenger of God" (Allah); but they killed him not, nor crucified him, but so it was made to appear to them, and those who differ therein are full of doubts, with no (certain) knowledge, but only conjecture to follow, for of a surety they killed him not.
Nay, God raised him up unto Himself; and God is Exalted in Power, Wise.

— Quran 4:157–158

In the past sense it is said that the Jews did not kill or crucify Jesus but it only appeared to them as if they had, because Jesus had been raised up by God according to the Quranic narrative. Given the historicity of Jesus' death and the Islamic theological doctrine on the inerrancy of the Quran, most mainstream Muslims and Islamic scholars deny the crucifixion and death of Jesus, deny the historical reliability of the Gospels, claim that the canonical Gospels are corruptions of the true Gospel of Jesus for their portrayal of Jesus dying, and they also claim that extra-Biblical evidence for Jesus' death is an alleged Christian forgery.

=== Future sense ===
In the future sense it is said that Jesus will not die until the day of resurrection. Given that, according to the Quran, Jesus had not died before going up to God, nor will he die before the day of resurrection, the interpretation by most Muslims is that Jesus entered heaven alive. Jesus' words "the day I die" in Quran 19:33 are interpreted by most Muslims in the future sense (Jesus will die on the day of resurrection):

There is not one of the People of the Scripture but will believe in him before his death, and on the Day of Resurrection he will be a witness against them.

— Quran 4:159

I only told them what You commanded me: that you shall worship God, my Lord and your Lord. And I was a witness over them while I was among them; but when You took me to Yourself, You became the Watcher over them—You are Witness over everything.

— Quran 5:117

So Peace is upon me the day I was born, and the day I die, and the day I shall be raised alive!.

— Quran 19:33

By "they did not kill him," "before his death," and "the day I die" it can be assumed, based on a cursory reading of the plain text, that Jesus did not die. By "God raised him up to himself" and "You took me to Yourself" it can be assumed, based on a cursory reading of the plain text, that Jesus ascended to Heaven rather than dying. Despite Quran 5:117 only speaking of Jesus' ascension and 19:33 only speaking of Jesus' future death, Muslim scholars like Mahmoud M. Ayoub claim the aforesaid verses "assert" Jesus' death.

== Gnostic influences ==
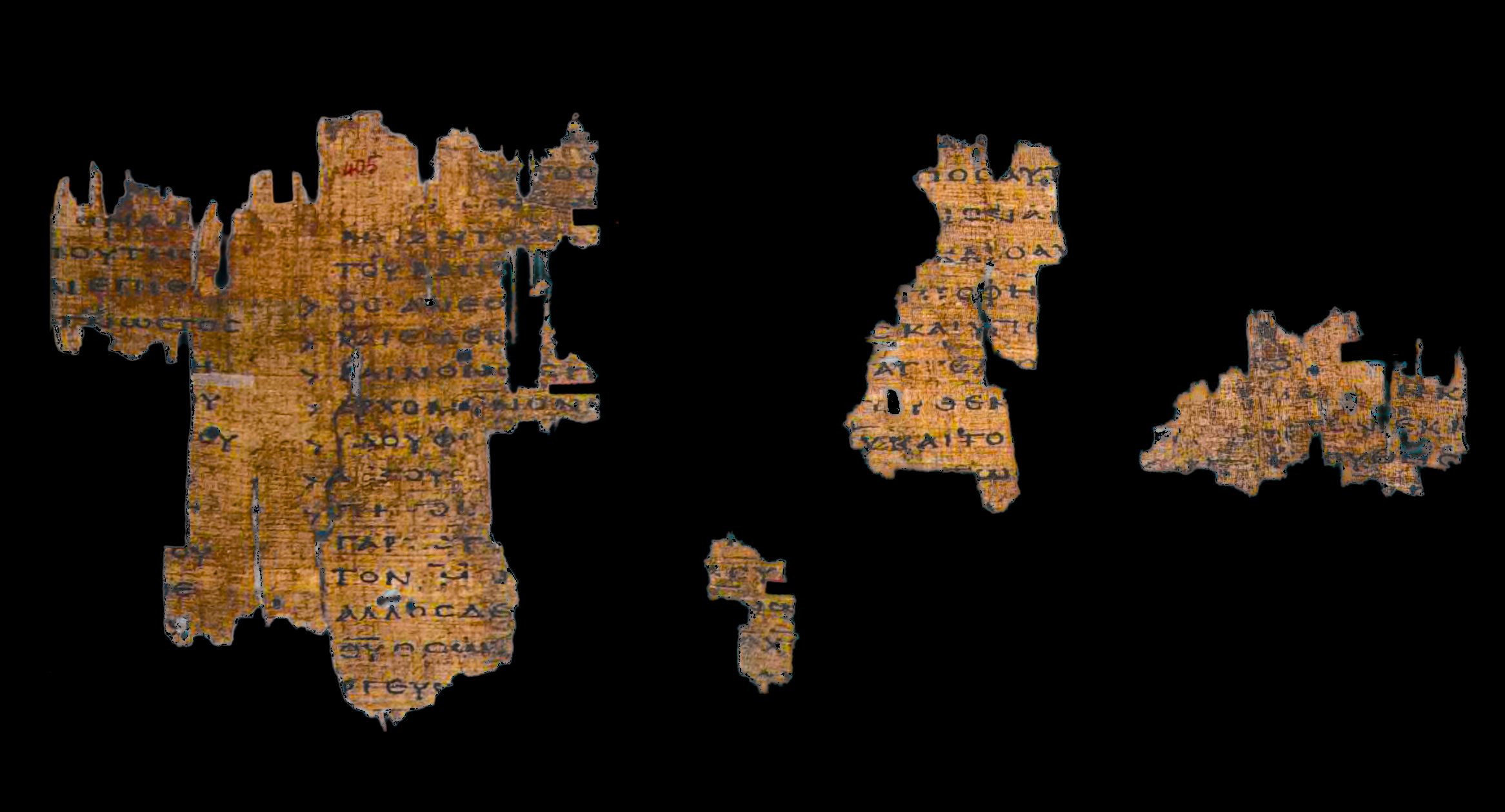
Papyrus of Irenaeus' treatise Against Heresies, which describes early Gnostic beliefs about Jesus' death, ascribing them to one Basilides, that predated Islam.

The belief that Jesus only appeared to be crucified and did not actually die predates Islam and is found in several New Testament apocrypha and Gnostic Gospels, the earliest being a letter attributed to Ignatius of Antioch dated to 110AD which mentions a group with the belief. Although most contemporary scholars argue that the Islamic portrayal of Jesus himself is not docetic, his crucifixion narrative in the Quran could be. The Greek Father of the Church and bishop Irenaeus in his heresiological treatise Against Heresies (180 CE) described early Gnostic beliefs regarding the crucifixion and death of Jesus that bear remarkable resemblance with the Islamic views, expounding on the hypothesis of substitution:

He [Christ] appeared on earth as a man and performed miracles (apparuisse eum ... virtutes perfecisse). Thus, he himself did not suffer. Rather, a certain Simon of Cyrene was compelled (Simonem quendam Cyrenaeum angariatum) to carry his cross for him. It was he [Simon] who was ignorantly and erroneously crucified (et hunc ... crucifixum), being transfigured by him [Jesus], so that (ut) he [Simon] might be thought to be Jesus. Moreover, Jesus assumed the form of Simon and stood by, laughing at them.

— Irenaeus, Against Heresies, Book I, Chapter 24, Section 40.

One of the Christian Gnostic writings found in the Nag Hammadi library, the Second Treatise of the Great Seth, has a similar substitutionist interpretation of Jesus' death:

I was not afflicted at all. Those there punished me, yet I did not die in solid reality but in what appears, in order that I not be put to shame by them [...] For my death which they think happened, (happened) to them in their error and blindness. They nailed their man up to their death. [...] Another, their father, was the one who drank the gall and the vinegar; it was not I. They were hitting me with the reed; another was the one who lifted up the cross on his shoulder, who was Simon. Another was the one on whom they put the crown of thorns. But I was rejoicing in the height over all the riches of the archons and the offspring of their error and their conceit, and I was laughing at their ignorance.

The Gnostic Apocalypse of Peter also holds a substitutionist interpretation of Jesus' death. It does differ in that it seems to think that Jesus's physical body was crucified (rather than saying it was Simon of Cyrene), just that his physical body was unimportant and the real Christ was a purely spiritual being:

I saw him (Jesus) seemingly being seized by them. And I said 'What do I see, O Lord? That it is you yourself whom they take, and that you are grasping me? Or who is this one, glad and laughing on the tree? And is it another one whose feet and hands they are striking?' The Savior said to me, 'He whom you saw on the tree, glad and laughing, this is the living Jesus. But this one into whose hands and feet they drive the nails is his fleshly part, which is the substitute being put to shame, the one who came into being in his likeness. But look at him and me.' But I, when I had looked, said 'Lord, no one is looking at you. Let us flee this place.' But he said to me, 'I have told you, 'Leave the blind alone!'. And you, see how they do not know what they are saying. For the son of their glory instead of my servant, they have put to shame.' And I saw someone about to approach us resembling him, even him who was laughing on the tree. And he was with a Holy Spirit, and he is the Savior. And there was a great, ineffable light around them, and the multitude of ineffable and invisible angels blessing them. And when I looked at him, the one who gives praise was revealed.

The Gospel of Peter is an apocryphal gospel that could be read as docetic. The British biblical scholar F. F. Bruce wrote in a commentary about this text:

The docetic note in this narrative appears in the statement that Jesus, while being crucified, 'remained silent, as though he felt no pain', and in the account of his death. It carefully avoids saying that he died, preferring to say that he 'was taken up', as though he - or at least his soul or spiritual self - was 'assumed' direct from the cross to the presence of God. (We shall see an echo of this idea in the Qur'an.) Then the cry of dereliction is reproduced in a form which suggests that, at that moment, his divine power left the bodily shell in which it had taken up temporary residence.

John of Damascus, a Syrian Eastern Orthodox monk, Christian theologian, and apologist that lived under the Umayyad Caliphate, reported in his heresiological treatise De Haeresibus (8th century) the Islamic denial of Jesus' crucifixion and his alleged substitution on the cross, attributing the origin of these doctrines to Muhammad:

And the Jews, having themselves violated the Law, wanted to crucify him, but having arrested him they crucified his shadow. But Christ, it is said, was not crucified, nor did he die; for God took him up to himself because of his love for him. And he [Muhammad] says this, that when Christ went up to heaven God questioned him saying "O Jesus, did you say that 'I am Son of God, and God'?" And Jesus, they say, answered: "Be merciful to me, Lord; you know that I did not say so, nor will I boast that I am your servant; but men who have gone astray wrote that I said this and they said lies concerning me and they have been in error". And although there are included in this scripture many more absurdities worthy of laughter, he insists that this was brought down to him by God.

In his scholarly monograph Gott ist Christus, der Sohn der Maria. Eine Studie zum Christusbild im Koran (1989, ISBN 3-923946-17-1), the German Catholic theologian and professor of religious studies Günther Risse states that Muhammad's distorted understanding of Jesus and the Christian faith, along with the misrepresentation of Christian beliefs about Jesus in the Quran and the hadith, were influenced by the non-Chalcedonian Monophysite Christianity that was prevalent at the time in the pre-Islamic Arabian peninsula and further in Abyssinia, Egypt, and Syria. A similar hypothesis regarding the Gnostic Christian influence on Muhammad's beliefs about the crucifixion of Jesus has been proposed by Neal Robinson, senior lecturer of Religious studies at the College of St. Paul and St. Mary, in his scholarly monograph Christ in Islam and Christianity (1991, ISBN 978-0-7914-0558-1).

If the substitutionist interpretation of 4:157 (that Christ was replaced on the cross) is taken as a valid reading of the Qurʾānic text, the question arises of whether this idea is represented in Christian sources. According to Irenaeus' Adversus Haereses, the Egyptian Gnostic Christian Basilides (of the second century) held the view that Christ (the divine nous, intelligence) was not crucified, but was replaced by Simon of Cyrene. However, both Clement of Alexandria and Hippolytus denied that Basilides held this view. But the substitutionist idea in a general form is quite clearly expressed in the Gnostic Nag Hammadi documents Apocalypse of Peter and The Second Treatise of the Great Seth.

This docetic interpretation regarding Jesus' crucifixion was also shared by Manichaeans. Since Manichaeism was still prevailing in Arabia during the 6th century, just alike prohibition against wine and fasting rules, Islamic views on Jesus' death might have been influenced by it. However, while Zoroastrianism existed only in the eastern and southern Arabia, the existence of Manichaeism in Mecca in the 6th-7th century is denied as lacking historical support. Similar reservations regarding the appearance of Manichaeism, Gnosticism, and Mazdakism in pre-Islamic Mecca are offered by Trompf & Mikkelsen et al. in their latest work (2018).

=== Gospel of Barnabas ===
The apocryphal Gospel of Barnabas, probably written during the Middle Ages, also promotes a non-death narrative. The work claims itself to be by the biblical Barnabas, who in this work is one of the twelve apostles; however, text of this Gospel is late and pseudepigraphical. Nonetheless, some scholars suggest that it may contain some remnants of an earlier, apocryphal work (perhaps Gnostic, Ebionite, or Diatessaronic), redacted to bring it more in line with Islamic doctrine. Some Muslims consider the surviving versions as transmitting a suppressed apostolic original.

According to the Gospel of Barnabas it was Judas, not Jesus, who was crucified on the cross. This work states that when Judas led the Roman soldiers to arrest Jesus in an effort to betray him, angels appeared to take Jesus out a window and up to the heavens. As Judas entered the room, his appearance was transformed to that of Jesus, and the Romans arrested him and brought him to be crucified. The narrative states this transformation of appearance not only fooled the Romans, but the Pharisees, the High Priest, the followers of Christ, and his mother Mary.

The Gospel of Barnabas then mentions that after three days since burial, Judas' body was stolen from his grave with rumors spreading of Jesus being risen from the dead. In following with Islamic lore, when Jesus was informed in the third heaven about what happened he prayed to God to be sent back to the earth, and later descended and gathered his mother, disciples, and followers and told them the truth of what happened. He then ascended back to the heavens, with the narrative continuing Islamic legend mirroring Christian doctrine of returning at the end of times as a just king.

== Literal interpretation ==
=== Earliest reports ===
Professor and Muslim scholar Mahmoud M. Ayoub sums up what the Quran states despite interpretative Islamic arguments:

The Quran, as we have already argued, does not deny the death of Christ. Rather, it challenges human beings who in their folly have deluded themselves into believing that they would vanquish the divine Word, Jesus Christ the Messenger of God. The death of Jesus is asserted several times and in various contexts (Quran 3:55; 5:117; 19:33).

Some disagreement and discord can be seen beginning with Ibn Ishaq's (d. 761 CE/130 AH) report of a brief accounting of events leading up to the crucifixion, firstly stating that Jesus was replaced by someone named Sergius, while secondly reporting an account of Jesus' tomb being located at Medina and thirdly citing the places in Quran 3:55 and 4:158 that God took Jesus up to himself.

Muslim historian al-Tabari (d. 923 CE/310 AH) records an interpretation transmitted from Ibn Ishaq Bishr: "God caused Jesus to die for seven hours". Ibn al-Athir forwarded the report that it was Judas, the betrayer, while also mentioning the possibility it was a man named Natlianus. Al-Masudi (d. 956 CE/343 AH) reported the death of Christ under Tiberius.

10th and 11th-century Ismaili Shia scholars Ja'far ibn Mansur al-Yaman, Abu Hatim Ahmad ibn Hamdan al-Razi, Abu Yaqub al-Sijistani, Mu'ayyad fi'l-Din al-Shirazi and the group Ikhwan al-Safa affirm the historicity of the crucifixion, reporting Jesus was crucified and not substituted by another man as maintained by many other popular Qur'anic commentators and Tafsir.

=== Substitution interpretation ===
Unlike the Christian view of the death of Jesus, most Muslims believe he was raised to Heaven without being put on the cross and God created a resemblance to appear exactly like Jesus who was crucified instead of Jesus, and he ascended bodily to Heaven, there to remain until his Second Coming in the End days.

The identity of the substitute has been a source of great interest. One proposal is that God used one of Jesus' enemies. Judas Iscariot, Jesus' betrayer, is often cited, and is mentioned in the Gospel of Barnabas. The second proposal is that Jesus asked for someone to volunteer to be crucified instead of him. Simon of Cyrene is the person most commonly accepted to have done it, perhaps because according to the Synoptic Gospels he was compelled by the Romans to carry Jesus' cross for him. Al-Baidawi writes that Jesus told his disciples in advance that whoever volunteered would go to heaven, while Ibn Kathir elaborates in his report a person described as "too young" possibly referring to James the Younger, volunteered .

==== Tabari's versions of events ====
Tabari (d. 839–923/ 224–310 AH) divided the early reports regarding Jesus' crucifixion into two groups. According to the first, one of Jesus' disciples volunteers to take the form of his master and is crucified. According to the other, the Jews mistakenly carried only an empty resemblance to the cross.

Tabari narrated the first strand as follows:

Jesus went into a house together with seventeen of his companions. The Jew surrounded them but when they burst in God made all the disciples look like Jesus. The pursuers, supposing that they had bewitched them, threatened to kill them all if they did not expose him. Then Jesus asked his companions which of them would purchase paradise for himself that day. One man volunteered and went out saying that he was Jesus and as God had made him look like Jesus they took him, killed him and crucified him. Thereupon "a semblance was made to them" and they thought that they had killed Jesus. The Christians likewise thought that it was Jesus who had been killed. And God raised Jesus right away.

The second strand is narrated as follows:

The Jews were looking for Jesus. They took hold of Simon, one of the disciples, and they said, "This is one of his companions." And he denied it and said, "I am not one of his disciples." So they left him. Others took hold of him and he likewise denied it. Then he heard the sound of the cock and he wept and it grieved him. 'On the morning of the next day one of his disciples went to the Jew and said, "What will you give me if I lead you to the Messiah?" He accepted their offer of thirty dirhams and led them to him. And a semblance had been made for them before that, and they took him and made certain of him and bound him with a cord and began to lead him and to say to him "You used to bring the dead to life and to drive away Satan and heal the jinn-possessed so why not deliver yourself from this cord?" And they spat on him and cast thorns on him until they brought him to the wood upon which they wanted to crucify him. And God raised Jesus to Himself. And they crucified the semblance which was made to them. And [Jesus] tarried seven [hours]. 'Then his mother, and the woman whom God had freed from jinn-possession when Jesus treated her, came weeping to where the crucified [semblance] was. And Jesus came to them both and said, "Why are you weeping?" They said, "Because of You." He said, "God raised me to Himself and I came to no harm. This [corpse] is something which was "made a semblance to them". Order the disciples to meet me at such and such place." Eleven met him at the place. Jesus missed the one who had sold him. They said, "Because he regretted what he had done he committed suicide by strangling himself." Jesus replied, "If he had turned towards God, God would have turned toward him".

==== Ibn Kathir's version of events ====
Ibn Kathir (d. 1373 CE/760 AH) follows traditions which suggest that a crucifixion did occur, but not with Jesus. After the event, Ibn Kathir reports the people were divided into three groups following three different narratives; The Jacobites believing 'God remained with us as long as He willed and then He ascended to Heaven;' The Nestorians believing 'The son of God was with us as long as he willed until God raised him to heaven;' and the third group of Christians who believing; 'The servant and messenger of God, Jesus, remained with us as long as God willed until God raised him to Himself.'

=== Docetism theory ===
A less common opinion among some scholars holds that the crucifixion of Jesus was just an illusion. Accordingly, only an appearance of Jesus' body was really put on the cross, and his spirit did not die, but ascended to heaven. Thus the Jews erred because they did not recognize the "Messiah", the spiritual form of Jesus. Docetists are Christians or Gnostics who believed that Jesus' physical body was an illusion, as was his crucifixion; that is, Jesus only seemed to have a physical body and to physically die, but in reality he was incorporeal, a pure spirit, and hence could not physically die. A docetic interpretation regarding Jesus' death is provided by Ghazali, who states Mansur Al-Hallaj quoted the Quranic verse about Jesus' death being merely an illusion, referring to both himself and Jesus as beings whose bodies could be killed but not their divine element. Other Docetic interpretations might also be found in Ismaili beliefs.

=== Swoon hypothesis ===
According to proponents of the swoon hypothesis, the appearances of the risen Jesus to his disciples following his physical resurrection from the dead three days in the tomb were merely perceived to be resurrection appearances by his followers; proponents of the swoon hypothesis believe that Jesus allegedly fell unconscious ("swooned") on the cross, survived the crucifixion, and then regained enough strength to appear before them while he was still alive. This and other similar theories about the resurrection of Jesus and witnesses to his resurrection became popular in the Western world after they were first proposed by some 18th–19th century Western authors and philosophers, including Oscar Wilde and Friedrich Schleiermacher; however, since the last decade of the 19th century all of them have been discarded as baseless and unacceptable by the majority of biblical scholars and academics.

This 200-year-old hypothesis continues to be the subject of debate in popular circles, but the scholarly literature considers it uncontroversial that Jesus died during the process of crucifixion. According to the American religion scholar John J. Johnson, professor of theology at New York University and Virginia Union University, "it was once commonplace for Muslim apologists to claim that the non-canonical Gospel of Barnabas (first published in 1907) could be used to corroborate the Koran's teaching on the crucifixion [of Jesus]. But today, all Christian scholars and most Muslim ones admit that the Barnabas was written sometime in the Middle Ages, and is therefore useless as a source for the life of Christ". He further explains that "Christ's death on the cross is not doubted by credentialed biblical scholars. This swoon theory is, of course, an old canard, and the idea that the disciples stole and hid Christ's body has been refuted by various Christian biblical scholars and theologians".

=== Jesus lives after having died ===
In regard to the interpretation of the Muslims who accept the historicity of Jesus' crucifixion, Mahmoud M. Ayoub states:

The Qur'an is not here speaking about a man, righteous and wronged though he may be, but about the Word of God who was sent to earth and returned to God. Thus the denial of killing of Jesus is a denial of the power of men to vanquish and destroy the divine Word, which is for ever victorious.

=== Ahmadiyya view ===
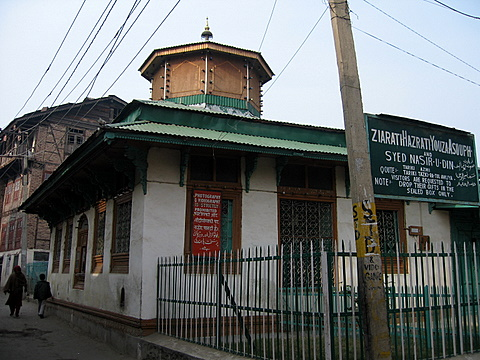
The Roza Bal shrine in Srinagar, Kashmir, believed by Ahmadi Muslims to be the tomb of Jesus.

In contrast to the mainstream Islamic views, the Ahmadiyya Muslim Community rejects the interpretation of Jesus being lifted alive to Heaven, and instead contend that Jesus survived the crucifixion, and go further to describe Jesus as a mortal man who was taken off the cross alive, and continued to preach in India until his natural death in Kashmir. Ahmadis believe that Jesus, having survived the crucifixion, later migrated to India to escape persecution in Judea and to further spread his message to the Lost Tribes of Israel.

The viewpoint of Jesus's migration to India had also been independently researched in the literature of authors prior to the foundation of the movement, for example most notably by the Russian historian Nicolas Notovitch in 1894. Ibn Babawayh (d.991 CE) in Ikhmal ad Din recounts that Jesus went to a far country. This was adapted by the Ahmadiyya Muslim Community as the basis of their theory regarding the voyage of Jesus in India.

The claim that Jesus is buried at the Roza Bal shrine in Srinagar was also promoted by writers such as Holger Kersten (1981). Sunni Muslim authorities at the shrine however consider this as heretical and say that it is a Muslim saint buried there. The claims of the theory have been examined in various documentaries, and have generated tourist visits to the site. Some scholars, such as Norbert Klatt (1988), and Indologist Günter Grönbold (1985), have critically dismissed the speculations of Jesus in India.

Adherents of the Ahmadiyya Muslim Community regard the prophecies in the Bible and hadith relating to the Second advent of Jesus as having been fulfilled in the likeness and personality of Mirza Ghulam Ahmad, who initiated the foundation of the Ahmadiyya movement. This view however is considered blasphemous by Sunni Muslim authorities and subsequently has led to the religious persecution against Ahmadi Muslims, especially in Pakistan.

=== Allegorical interpretation ===
In reference to the Quranic quote "We have surely killed Jesus the Christ, son of Mary, the apostle of God", Ayoub asserts this boast not as the repeating of a historical lie or the perpetuating of a false report, but an example of human arrogance and folly with an attitude of contempt towards God and His messenger(s). Ayoub furthers what modern scholars of Islam interpret regarding the historical death of Jesus, the man, as man's inability to kill off God's Word and the Spirit of God, which the Quran testifies were embodied in Jesus Christ. Ayoub continues highlighting the denial of the killing of Jesus as God denying men such power to vanquish and destroy the divine Word. The words, "they did not kill him, nor did they crucify him" speaks to the profound events of ephemeral human history, exposing mankind's heart and conscience towards God's will. The claim of humanity to have this power against God is illusory. "They did not slay him...but it seemed so to them" speaks to the imaginations of mankind, not the denial of the actual event of Jesus dying physically on the cross.

== See also ==
- Afterlife in Islam
- Basilidians
- Christ myth theory
- Comparative religion
- Gospel of Barnabas
- Gospel of Basilides
- Gospel of James
- Historicity of Jesus
  - Apostles of Jesus
  - Family of Jesus
  - Historical background of New Testament
  - Historical Jesus
  - Life of Jesus in the New Testament
  - Ministry of Jesus
  - Quest for the historical Jesus
  - Tomb of Jesus
  - Unknown years of Jesus
- Islamic eschatology
  - Ahmadi Muslim beliefs about Jesus
  - Islamic mythology
  - List of Mahdi claimants
  - Major Occultation and Minor Occultation
  - Masih ad-Dajjal
  - Reappearance of Muhammad al-Mahdi
  - Signs of the appearance of the Mahdi
  - Signs of the coming of Judgement Day
- List of people in both the Bible and the Quran
- Islamic theology
  - Createdness of the Quran
  - Quranist school
- Simon of Cyrene

== Bibliography ==
- Bulliet, Richard W. (2015). "Islamo-Christian Civilization". In Blidstein, Moshe; Silverstein, Adam J.; Stroumsa, Guy G. (eds.). The Oxford Handbook of the Abrahamic Religions. Oxford: Oxford University Press. pp. 109–120. doi:10.1093/oxfordhb/9780199697762.013.6. ISBN 978-0-19-969776-2. LCCN 2014960132. S2CID 170430270.
- Bruce, F. F. (1974). Jesus and Christian Origins Outside the New Testament. Grand Rapids, Michigan: Wm. B. Eerdmans. p. 93. ISBN 0340158689.
- Cole, Juan (March 2021). Stausberg, Michael; Engler, Steven (eds.). "'It was made to appear to them so': the Crucifixion, Jews, and Sasanian war propaganda in the Qur'ān". Religion. 51 (3). Taylor & Francis: 404–422. doi:10.1080/0048721X.2021.1909170. ISSN 1096-1151. LCCN 76615899. OCLC 186359943. S2CID 233646869.
- Ehrman, Bart D. (2003). Lost Scriptures: Books that Did Not Make It into the New Testament. New York: Oxford University Press. pp. 82–86. ISBN 0-19-514182-2.
- Gil, Moshe (1992). "The Creed of Abū 'Āmir". In Kraemer, Joel L. (ed.). Israel Oriental Studies. Vol. 12. Leiden: Brill Publishers. pp. 9–58. ISBN 978-90-04-09584-7. ISSN 0334-4401.
- Hughes, Aaron W. (2013). "The Quran: The Base Narrative". Muslim Identities: An Introduction to Islam. New York: Columbia University Press. p. 85. ISBN 978-0-231-53192-4. JSTOR 10.7312/hugh16146.8. S2CID 169663918.
- Kelhoffer, James A. (2014). Conceptions of "Gospel" and Legitimacy in Early Christianity. Wissenschaftliche Untersuchungen zum Neuen Testament. Vol. 324. Tübingen: Mohr Siebeck. p. 80. doi:10.1628/978-3-16-152993-1. ISBN 978-3-16-152636-7.
- Khalidi, Tarif (2001). The Muslim Jesus: Sayings and Stories in Islamic Literature. Cambridge, Massachusetts: Harvard University Press. pp. 9–32. ISBN 9780674011151.
- Korbel, Jonathan; Preckel, Claudia (2016). "Ghulām Aḥmad al-Qādiyānī: The Messiah of the Christians—Peace upon Him—in India (India, 1908)". In Bentlage, Björn; Eggert, Marion; Krämer, Hans-Martin; Reichmuth, Stefan (eds.). Religious Dynamics under the Impact of Imperialism and Colonialism. Numen Book Series. Vol. 154. Leiden: Brill Publishers. pp. 426–442. doi:10.1163/9789004329003_034. ISBN 978-90-04-32511-1.
- Lanier, Gregory R. (May 2016). ""It Was Made to Appear Like that to Them:" Islam's Denial of Jesus' Crucifixion". Reformed Faith & Practice: The Journal of Reformed Theological Seminary. 1 (1). Orlando, Florida: Reformed Theological Seminary: 39-55. Archived from the original on 30 June 2019.
- Leirvik, Oddbjørn (2010). "Christ in the Qurʾān and in Ḥadīth". Images of Jesus Christ in Islam (2nd ed.). London: Continuum International. pp. 34–36, 129–132. doi:10.5040/9781472548528.ch-002. ISBN 978-1-4411-7739-1.
- Luttikhuizen, Gerard P. (2003). "The Suffering Jesus and The Invulnerable Christ in the Gnostic Apocalypse of Peter". In Bremmer, Jan N.; Czachesz, István (eds.). The Apocalypse of Peter (PDF). Leuven: Peeters Publishers. pp. 187–200. ISBN 90-429-1375-4.
- Neely, Brent (July 2017). "At Cross Purposes: Islam and the Crucifixion of Christ, a theological response". Transformation. 34 (3). Newbury Park, California: SAGE Publications: 176–213. doi:10.1177/0265378816631552. JSTOR 90010414. S2CID 171352591.
- Reynolds, Gabriel S. (May 2009). "The Muslim Jesus: Dead or Alive?" (PDF). Bulletin of the School of Oriental and African Studies (University of London). 72 (2). Cambridge: Cambridge University Press: 237–258. doi:10.1017/S0041977X09000500. JSTOR 40379003. S2CID 27268737. Archived (PDF) from the original on 17 June 2012.
- Robinson, Neal (1991). "The Crucifixion – Non-Muslim Approaches". Christ in Islam and Christianity: The Representation of Jesus in the Qur'an and the Classical Muslim Commentaries. Albany, New York: SUNY Press. pp. 106–140. ISBN 978-0-7914-0558-1. S2CID 169122179.
- Waardenburg, Jean Jacques (2003). "The Earliest Relations of Islam with Other Religions: The Christians in Northern Arabia". Muslims and Others: Relations in Context. Religion and Reason. Vol. 41. Berlin and Boston: De Gruyter. pp. 94–109. doi:10.1515/9783110200959. ISBN 978-3-11-017627-8.
