= Tomb of Jesus =

Any place where it is believed Jesus was entombed

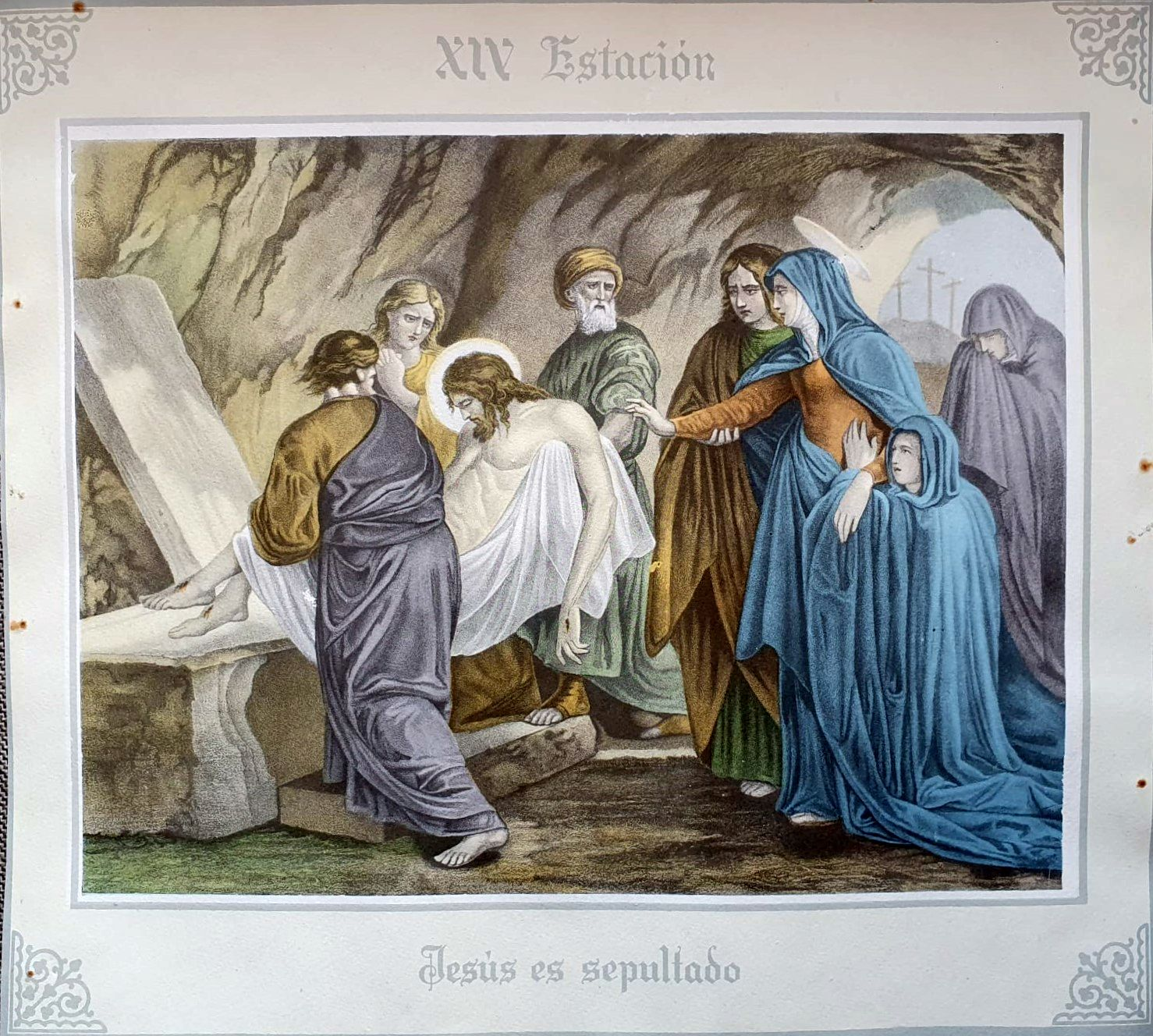
Jesus is laid in the tomb and covered in incense. Station 14 of the Calvary of the Church of Our Lady of the Assumption (Villamelendro de Valdavia).

According to the gospel accounts, Jesus was buried in a tomb which originally belonged to Joseph of Arimathea, a wealthy man who, believing Jesus was the Messiah, offered his own sepulcher for the burial of Jesus. According to Christian tradition, the empty tomb of Jesus is located in the Church of the Holy Sepulchre. Scholars note that there are two or three independent accounts of the burial Jesus in a tomb and archeologists are in general agreement on it being the possible location. Archeological findings in the site are consistent with details found in early sources.

== Church of the Holy Sepulchre ==
A diagram of the modern church showing the traditional site of Calvary and the Tomb of Jesus

The Church of the Holy Sepulchre is a church in the Christian Quarter of the Old City of Jerusalem. Around 135 CE, Emperor Hadrian covered the tomb and erected a Temple of Aphrodite on top that stood until Constantine rediscovered the tomb around 325 CE. It contains, according to traditions dating back to the fourth century, the two holiest sites in Christianity: the site where Jesus was crucified, at a place known as Calvary (or Golgotha), and Jesus's empty tomb, where he is believed by Christians to have been buried and resurrected. Dale Allison finds “a fair chance” that the church actually marks the location of the burial of Jesus.

Details of the tomb of Jesus have been recovered by archeological research on the Church of the Holy Sepulchre, and many archeologists are in general agreement that this location is likely the location of the tomb of Jesus. The Gospel of John and archaeological finds show at least seven corroborations in mundane details with the Church of the Holy Sepulchre such as the location, that it was near a quarry, had a garden (corroborated by Josephus as well), matches with tombs of the time period, etc. The marble covering protecting the original limestone slab -- upon which Jesus was said to have been laid by Joseph of Arimathea -- was temporarily removed for restoration and cleaning on October 26, 2016. Physical testing of a mortar layer between the original older limestone tomb and later marble slab, revealed that the original shrine construction around the actual tomb could be securely dated to the time of Constantine, as historical records indicate.

== In the Apocrypha ==
Within the apocryphal text known as the Gospel of Peter, the tomb of Jesus is called "Joseph's garden".

== Other locations ==
=== The Garden Tomb ===
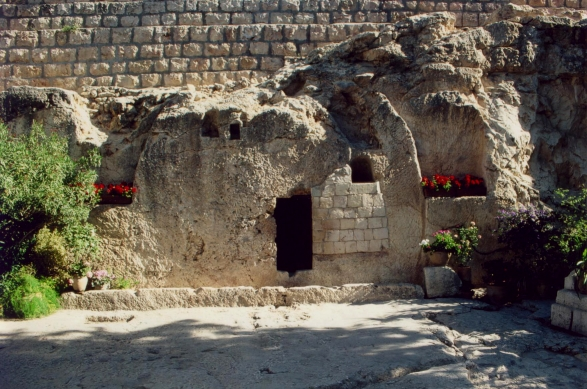
The Garden Tomb in Jerusalem.

The Garden Tomb is a rock-cut tomb in Jerusalem, which was unearthed in 1867 and at the time was considered by some Protestants to be a possible location of the tomb of Jesus. The tomb has been dated by Israeli archaeologist Gabriel Barkay to the 8th–7th centuries BC.

=== Talpiot Tomb ===
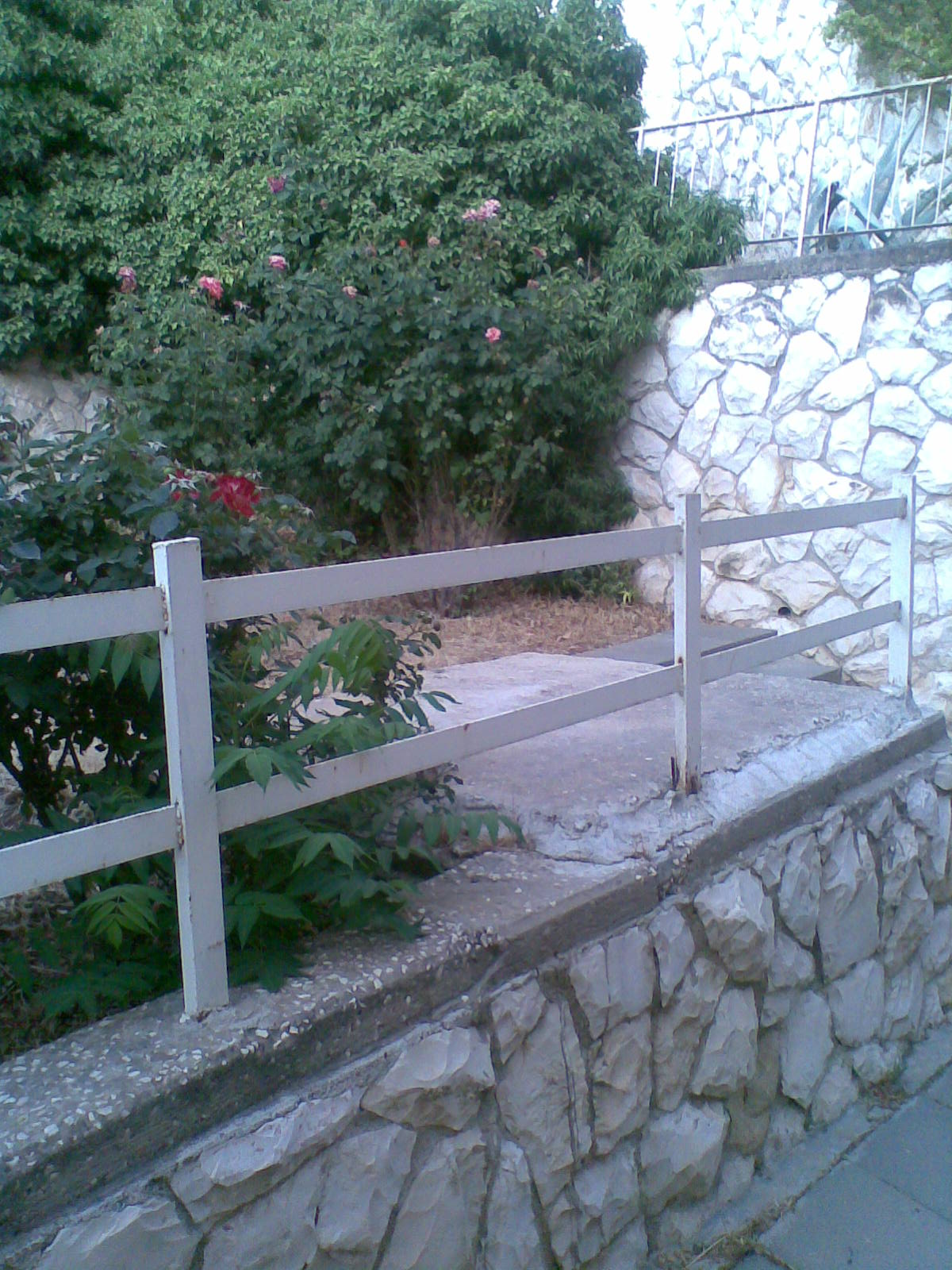
The sealed Talpiot Tomb

The Talpiot Tomb (or Talpiyot Tomb) is a rock-cut tomb discovered in 1980 in the East Talpiot neighborhood, five kilometers (three miles) south of the Old City in East Jerusalem. It contained ten ossuaries, six inscribed with epigraphs, including one interpreted as "Yeshua bar Yehosef" ("Jeshua, son of Joseph"), although the inscription is partially illegible, and its translation and interpretation is widely disputed. It is widely believed by scholars that the Jesus in Talpiot (if this is indeed his name) is not Jesus of Nazareth, but a person with the same name, since he appears to have a son named Judas (buried next to him) and the tomb shows signs of belonging to a wealthy Judean family, while Jesus came from a low-class Galilean family.

=== Roza Bal ===
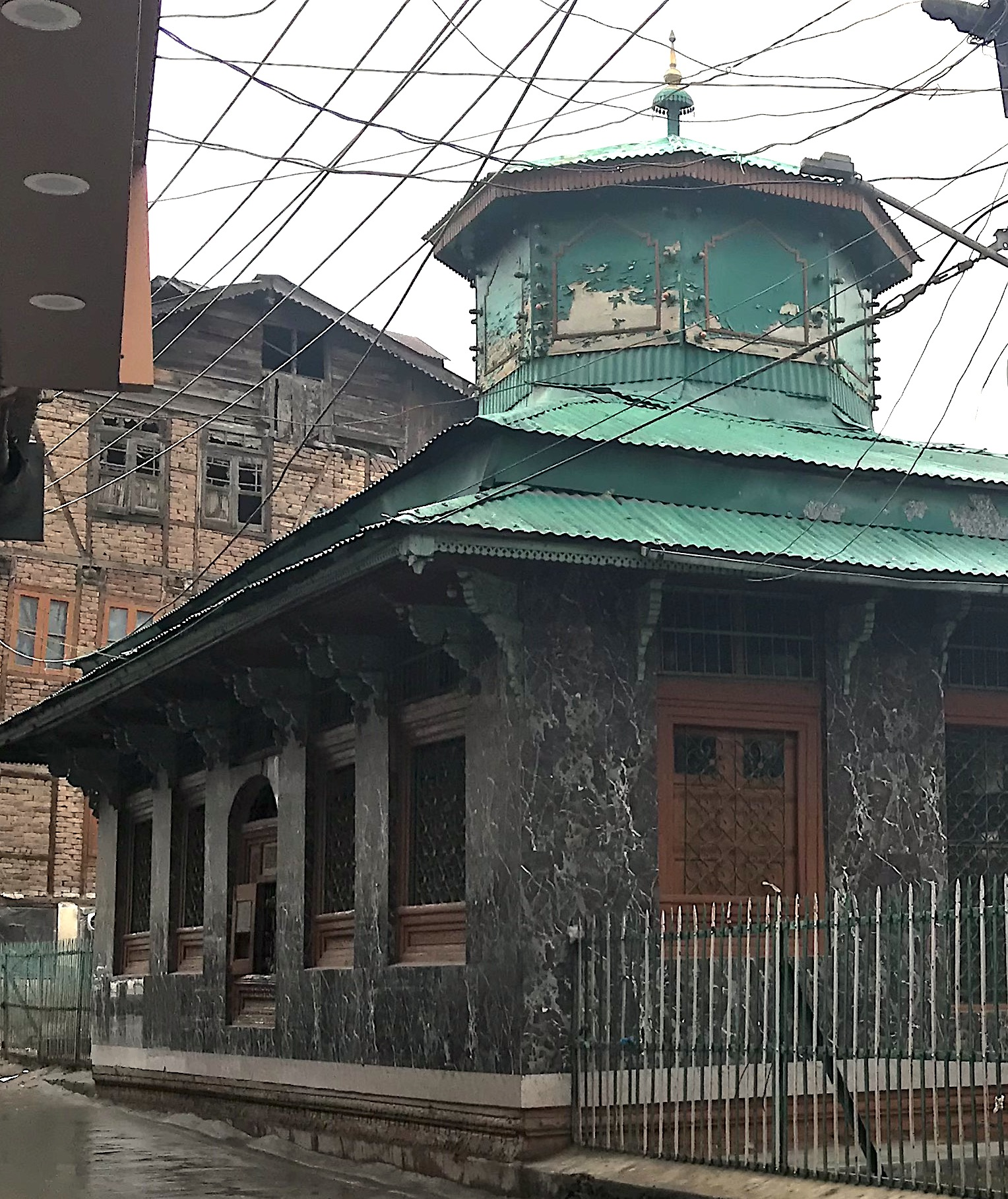
Roza Bal shrine in Srinagar, Kashmir

The Roza Bal is a shrine located in the Khanyar quarter in downtown area of Srinagar in Kashmir. The word roza means tomb, the word bal mean place. Locals believe a sage is buried here, Yuzasaf (alternatively Yuz Asaf or Youza Asouph), alongside another Muslim holy man, Mir Sayyid Naseeruddin.

The shrine was relatively unknown until the founder of the Ahmadiyya movement, Mirza Ghulam Ahmad, claimed in 1899 that it is actually the tomb of Jesus. This view is maintained by Ahmadis today, though it is rejected by the local Sunni caretakers of the shrine, one of whom said "the theory that Jesus is buried anywhere on the face of the earth is blasphemous to Islam."

=== Kirisuto no haka ===
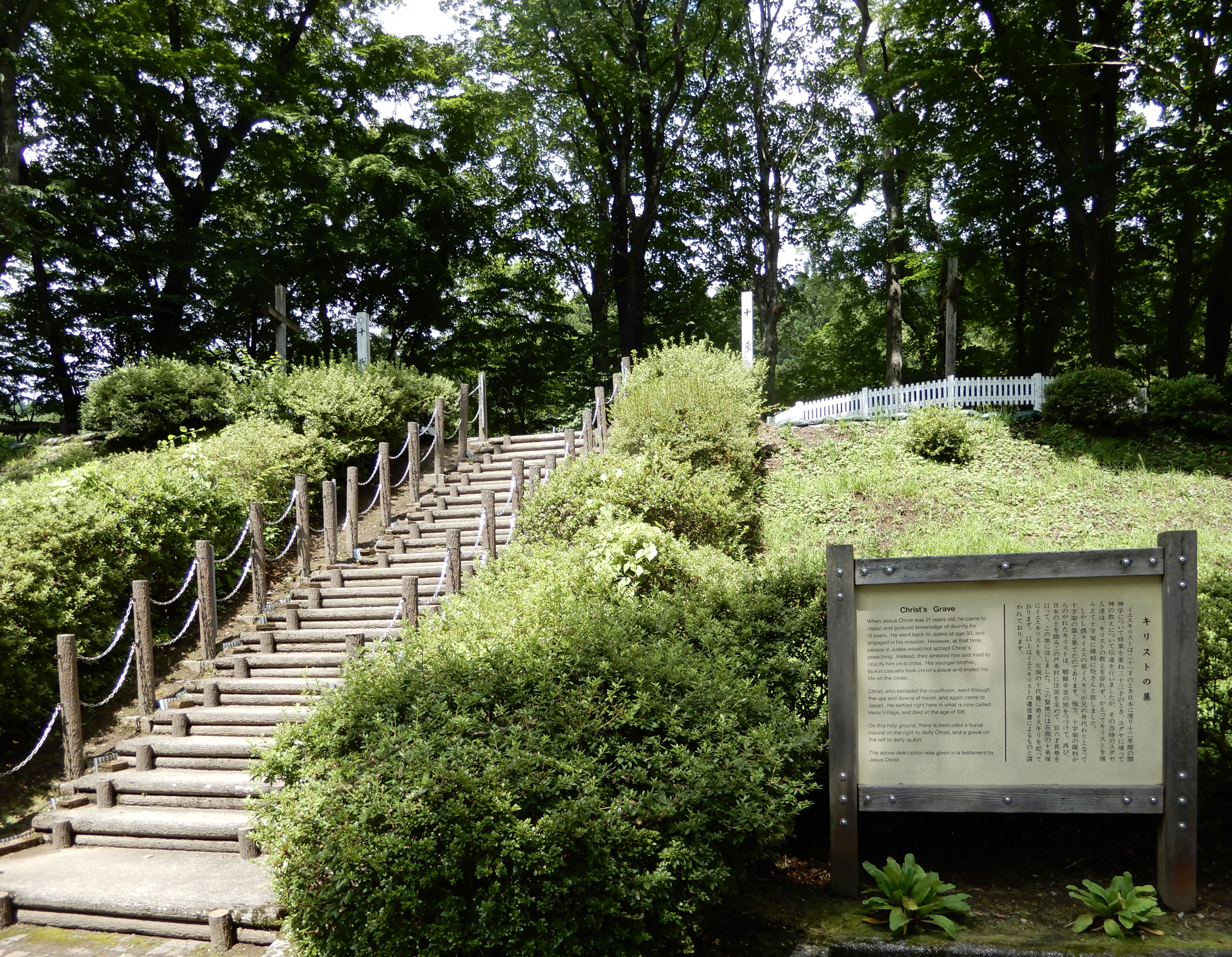
Alleged tomb of Jesus in Shingo Village

Shingō village in Japan contains another location of what is purported to be the last resting place of Jesus, the so-called "Tomb of Jesus" (Kirisuto no haka), and the residence of Jesus's last descendants, the family of Sajiro Sawaguchi. According to the Sawaguchi family's claims, Jesus Christ did not die on the cross at Golgotha. Instead his brother, Isukiri, took his place on the cross, while Jesus fled across Siberia to Mutsu Province, in northern Japan. Once in Japan, he changed his name to Torai Tora Daitenku, became a rice farmer, married a twenty-year old Japanese woman named Miyuko, and raised three daughters near what is now Shingō. While in Japan, it is asserted that he traveled, learned, and eventually died at the age of 106. His body was exposed on a hilltop for four years. According to the customs of the time, Jesus's bones were collected, bundled, and buried in the mound purported to be the grave of Jesus Christ.
