= Fida Muhammad Hassnain =

Indian historian

Fida Muhammad Hasnain
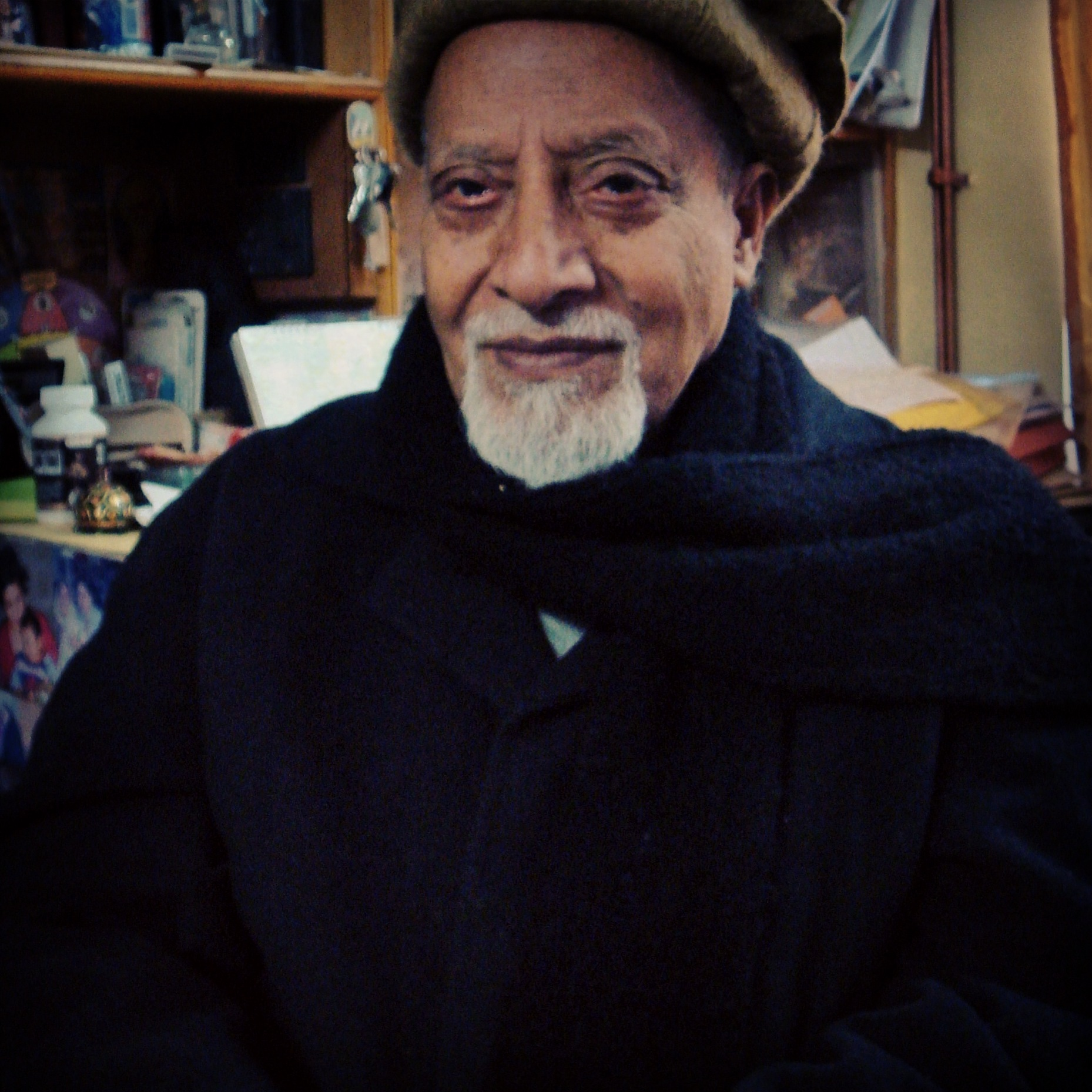
- Born: 1924
- Died: 2016; Srinagar
- Education: University of Punjab; Aligarh Muslim University

Fida Muhammad Hassnain (Urdu فدا حسنین; Srinagar, 1924 – 2016) was a Kashmiri writer, lecturer and Sufi mystic.

== Early life and education ==
He was born in 1924 in Srinagar, Kashmir, as the child of schoolteachers. His father fought with the British Indian forces in the Boer War in South Africa in 1902. Fida Hassnain graduated from the University of Punjab and the Aligarh Muslim University, and became a barrister, but the events surrounding the partition of colonial British India made him lose faith in the law, and after a short period of social work he became a lecturer in 1947 at the Sri Patrap (SP) College in Srinagar. In 1954, he became Director of the Kashmir State Archives, retiring in 1983.

== Career ==
His study tours resulted in the salvaging of several hundred manuscripts in Arabic, Sanskrit and Persian, which were housed in the Archives and Oriental Research Libraries. As an archaeologist, he conducted several excavations.

He has written several books on the subject of Lost years of Jesus and Kashmir, which have been translated into Spanish, Italian, Polish, and Japanese. He has made frequent guest appearances in documentaries about the tomb of Roza Bal supporting the teaching of the founder of Ahmadiyya Islam Mirza Ghulam Ahmad (1899) that Jesus of Nazareth died in India. Christian theologians have been highly critical of Hassnain's works - Christian academics dismissing these claims include Günter Grönbold, Wilhelm Schneemelcher, Norbert Klatt, Per Beskow, and Gerald O'Collins. In January 2009 The Jammu Kashmir Government recognized Hassnain for his lifetime contributions. Fida Hassnain on died 9 July 2016 in Srinagar, Kashmir.

== Works ==
Books

- Buddhist Kashmir (Light & Life Publishers, 1973).
- Hindu Kashmir (Light & Life Publishers, 1977).
- British policy towards Kashmir, 1846-1921: Kashmir in Anglo-Russian politics (Sterling, 1974).
- Gilgit, the Northern Gate of India (Sterling, 1978).
- Freedom struggle in Kashmir (Rima Publishing House, 1988).
- The Islamic Revolution in Iran (Rima Publishing House, 1989).
- A Search for the Historical Jesus: From Apocryphal, Buddhist, Islamic and Sanskrit Sources (Down-to-Earth Books, 1994). ISBN 9781878115171.

Edited works

- Kashmir Misgovernment (Gulshan Publishers, 1980).
- Heritage of Kashmir (Gulshan Publishers, 1980).
