= My Creed =

My Creed may refer to:

- "An American's Creed" (also "My Creed"), a short statement by American politician Dean Alfange
- "My Creed", a poem by American Congregationalist minister, author, and hymnwriter Howard Walter
