= Comrades (TV series) =

1983–84 BBC TV documentary series

Comrades was a 1985–86 BBC television documentary series and the related book about life in the Soviet Union composed mainly of interviews and fly on the wall filming of 'normal' Soviet citizens. BBC producer Richard Denton was able achieve a largely unprecedented degree of freedom in selecting and interviewing people.

== U.S. airings ==
Frontline aired this programme on most PBS stations in 1986.
