= Mullah Nadiri =

Kashmiri poet of Persian-language

- Born: Kashmir
- Occupations: Poet, Historian

Academic work
- Era: 15th century
- Sub-discipline: History of Kashmir
- Notable works: Tarikh-i-Kashmir (lost)

Mullah Nadri or Mulla Nasiri (fl. 1420 CE) was a Persian-language poet in Kashmir during the reign of Sultan Sikandar (1378–1416, reigned 1389–1413) and then at the court of Zain-ul-Abidin (1423–1473).

He wrote several lost books, including a lost Tarikh-i-Kashmir, (history of Kashmir). The Persian accounts of Mulla Nadiri, as with those of Mulla Ahmad Kashmiri, Qazi Ibrahim and Hasan Qari (1580 AD), together with the Sanskrit chronicles of Jonaraja (d. 1659 CE) and his pupil Srivara (dates unknown), served as sources for 17th Century histories - the Tarikh-i-Kashmir of Hasan b. Ali Kashmiri (1616 CE), the Baharistan-i-Shahi, and the Tarikh-i-Kashmir of Haidar Malik (Persian 1621, English 1991).
