= Khanyar =

- Interactive map of Khanyar
- Coordinates: 34°05′29″N 74°49′10″E
- Country: India
- Union Territory: Jammu and Kashmir
- District: Srinagar district
- Settled: Ancient
- Elevation: 1,592 m (5,223 ft)

Languages
  - Official: Urdu
- Time zone: UTC+5:30 (IST)
- PIN: 190003
- Telephone code: 0194
- Vehicle registration: JK01
- Distance from Delhi: 808 kilometres (502 mi)
- Distance from Mumbai: 2,229 kilometres (1,385 mi)

Khanyar is a locality in downtown from Khayam to Khwaja Bazar in Srinagar district in Union Territory of Jammu and Kashmir, India. It lies about 4 kilometers north from Lal Chowk, Srinagar. This locality is known for the shrine of Dastgeer Sahib, Roza Bal, tomb of Yuz Asaf.

== Places ==
Known for its shrine of Abdul Qadir Gilani, a renowned scholar, also called as Dastgeer sahib by locals. This shrine was built in 1806 A.D. from where the relic, which was given by an Afghan traveller to then governor of the state, Sardar Abdullah Khan, was displayed on various religious festivals. The shrine was enlarged in 1877 A.D. by Khwaja Sanaullah Shawl.

The tomb of Yuz Asaf in Roza Bal is also situated here. In 1899 Mirza Ghulam Ahmad claimed that it was the tomb of Jesus Christ Others have dismissed this as nothing but a way to attract tourists.

Khanyar is surrounded on one side by once a freshwater lake known as Brari Nambal which at present day is in highly deteriorated condition due to official negligence and choking of it drainage canals. It was once drained by a famous canal Nallah Mar, which was filled up and converted to a road called Nallah Mar Road.
