= Tarikh-i-Kashmir =

Books on the history of Kashmir

The Tarikh-i-Kashmir (History of Kashmir) refers to several history books of Kashmir's Sultanate period, some of them have been lost and partially used as sources for the others.

== Lost sources ==
Earlier lost sources include;

- History of Mullah Ahmad Kashmiri (lost)
- History of Mullah Nadiri (lost)

=== Use of Mullah Nadiri in Ahmadi texts ===
The Ahmadi writer Khwaja Nazir Ahmad in his advocacy of evidence for Jesus in India (1952) produced a photograph of a page in a folio he had tried to purchase in 1946 which he identified as being from Mullah Nadri. The folio is now lost and no identification of the document had been made by academic sources.

" ... and on the other stone of the stairs he also inscribed that he (Yuz Asaf) was Yusu, Prophet of Children of Israel (Aishan Yusu Paighambar-i-Bani Israel ast). I have seen in a book of Hindus that this prophet was really Hazrat Isa (Jesus), Ruh-Allah (the Spirit of God) on whom be peace (and salutations) and had also assumed the name of Yuz Asaf. The (real) knowledge is with God. He spent his life in this (valley). After his departure (death) he was laid to rest in Mohalla Anzmarah. It is also said that lights (anwar) of prophethood used to emanate from the tomb (Rauza) of this Prophet. Raja Gopadatta having ruled for sixty years and two months died.. ." Translation by Khwaja Nazir Ahmad of photograph on page 393 of Jesus in Heaven on Earth 1952

Nazir Ahmad speculates that the Hindu text mentioned in the text in the 1946 photograph identifying Yuz Asaf with Jesus might have been the Bhavishya Purana. However that part of the text of the Bhavishya Purana dates from the British colonial era and does not mention Yuz Asaf, only Jesus and Mohammed.

== Surviving histories ==
The surviving contemporary histories of the Sultanate are:

- Tarikh-i-Kashmir by Sayyid Ali completed in 1579;
- Tarikh-i-Kashmir by an anonymous writer (Aumer 287) written in 1590;
- Baharistan-i-shahi, also anonymous, written in the time of Jahangir;
- Tarikh-i-Kashmir by Hasan b. Ali Kashmiri also written in the time of Jahangir;
- Tarikh-i-Kashmir by Haidar Malik completed in 1620–21.

Other histories of Kashmir are eighteenth and nineteenth century abridgements of the above works.
