= Haji Mohi-ud-din Miskin =

Haji Mohi-ud-Din Miskin (died in Srinagar, 1921) also Ghulam Mohiuddin was a Kashmiri poet who also wrote a history of Kashmir, Tarikh-i-Kabir (completed 1892, published 1900). He is the first, after Mirza Ghulam Ahmad himself (1899), to record identification of the Roza Bal tomb with Jesus: "Others believe that it is [the] tomb of a great Prophet who is no other than Hazrat Isa [Jesus], the Spirit of God.” (1902).
