= Yuz Asaf =

Josephat in Arabic and Urdu

Youza Asaf, Youza Asaph, Youza Asouph, Yuz Asaf, Yuzu Asaf, Yuzu Asif, or Yuzasaf, (Urdu: یوضا آصف) are Arabic and Urdu variations of the name Josaphat, and are primarily connected with Christianized and Islamized versions of the life of the Buddha found in the legend of Barlaam and Josaphat.

According to Ahmadiyya thought, the name Yuz Asaf is of Buddhist derivation, and possibly from Yusu or Yehoshua (Jesus) and Asaf (the Gatherer).

== Overview ==
According to Ahmadiyya thought, the Yuz Asaf was a prophet of the ahl-i kitab (People of the Book) whose real name was Isa – the Quranic name for Jesus. The prophet Yuz Asaf came to Kashmir from the West (Holy Land) during the reign of Raja Gopadatta (c 1st century A.D) according to the ancient documents held by the current custodian of the tomb.

According to Tarikh-i-Kashmir, a history of Kashmir written between 1579 and 1620, Yuzu Asaf was a Prophet of God who travelled to Kashmir from a foreign land.

In 1747, a local Srinagar Sufi writer, Khwaja Muhammad Azam Didamari, stated that the Roza Bal is a shrine to a foreign prophet and prince, Youza Asouph.

Indologist Günter Grönbold in his Jesus in Indien assesses that the shrine was previously Hindu, before the Islamization of Kashmir and is possibly the grave of a Buddhist or Hindu saint rather than a Sufi, but, in any case, has no connection with Jesus or Christianity.

== Ghulam Ahmad and Ahmadiyya belief ==
Having stumbled upon research by Russian explorer Nicolas Notovitch, Mirza Ghulam Ahmad, the founder of the Ahmadiyya movement, identified Yuz Asaf as a name that Jesus of Nazareth may have assumed following his crucifixion and migration from Palestine. Ahmad further identified the Roza Bal shrine located in Srinagar, Kashmir as the tomb of Jesus. Drawing on Kashmiri oral traditions, as well as the Qur'an, Hadith and accounts by explorers, Mirza Ghulam Ahmad postulated that Jesus travelled to Srinagar, where he settled and married a woman called Maryam (Mary), and that Maryam bore Yuz Asaf children, before he died aged 120 years. He discusses this belief in the book Jesus in India. More recent Ahmadiyya writers assert that the tomb of Mary, the mother of Jesus is in Murree, Pakistan.

Mirza Ghulam Ahmad's use of various Hindu and Islamic sources have been deemed to be misunderstandings or distortions by various scholars of Buddhism including the Swedish scholar Per Beskow in Jesus in Kashmir: Historien om en legend (1981), the German indologist Günter Grönbold, in Jesus in Indien - Das Ende einer Legende (1985) and Norbert Klatt, in Lebte Jesus in Indien?: Eine religionsgeschichtliche Klärung (1988). His views are considered heretical by the majority Sunni Islamic scholars, who assert that Jesus is alive in heaven.

Muslims living near the shrine believe Yuz Asaf was a Sufi saint.

== See also ==
- Jesus in Ahmadiyya Islam
