= Richard Denton (producer) =

British television producer

Richard Denton is a British television producer. Currently the Series Producer of the returning strand Shakespeare Uncovered which is building to be 18 films as Prefaces to Shakespeare in documentary format. He was perhaps previously best known for his BBC documentary series Comrades.

== Documentaries ==
- Public School - a BBC television film series (made in 1979; transmitted in 1980) about Radley College, an independent boarding school for boys in Oxfordshire.
- Kingswood: A Comprehensive School - a BBC television series (made in 1980/81 and transmitted in 1982) about The Kingswood School, a typical Northamptonshire comprehensive school.
- Atheism: A Rough History of Disbelief presented by Jonathan Miller - Famous Quotations narrated by Bernard Hill.
- Did Jesus Die? - a documentary including material on Jesus in India theories and the Roza Bal shrine. Narrated by Bernard Hill
- Comrades - a 12 part observational series made in 1984/5 filming different stories across the USSR
- "Papa Wojtyla" A three part biographical BBC series on Pope John Paul II including the first ever TV interview with any Pope
- "Caviar & Cornflakes". BBC film about British Journalists (Patrick Cockburn) and Diplomats in Moscow at the time of Chernobyl accident
- "Born in the USSR" BBC film about the return of Vladimir Ashkenazy the pianist and conductor for his first visit after his Defection from the Soviet Union
- "Miss USSR" international documentary for PBS and BBC about the first ever Soviet Union Beauty Pageant
- "Madness" a five part series presented by Jonathan Miller for BBC
- "The Real John Lennon" A Channel Four biographical documentary
- "Cilla: in Black and White." A Channel Four biographical documentary
- "Sex Slaves in the Cellar" Channel Five .
- "Shakespeare Uncovered" an ongoing celebrity led series of documentaries for PBS on individual Shakespeare plays
