= Khwaja Nazir Ahmad =

Khwaja Nazir Ahmad (Urdu: خواجہ نذیر احمد; December 2, 1897 – 1970) was an Ahmadiyya writer. After experiments with Hinduism and Christianity he converted back to Islam in 1919 and in 1923, aged 25, became imam of Woking's mosque. He returned to become a Senior Advocate of the Federal Court of Pakistan and an Advocate of His Majesty's High Court of Judicature at Lahore.

Prior to the independence of Pakistan in 1948, he toured Kashmir with Aziz Kashmiri, editor of the Ahmadiyya weekly paper in Srinagar, looking for evidence supporting the claim of Mirza Ghulam Ahmad made in 1899, that the Roza Bal shrine of the holy man Yuz Asaf in Srinagar is the grave of Jesus of Nazareth. In 1952 he published his Jesus in heaven on earth (English Edition, Lahore and Woking, 1952) Aziz Kashmiri published his own similar book in Urdu in 1954 (English 1968).
