= Paul C. Pappas =

American writer (born 1934)

Paul Constantine Pappas (born 1934) is an American writer. He is professor of history at West Virginia Institute of Technology.

== Publications ==
- United States and the Greek War for Independence 1821-1828, New York: Columbia University Press, 1985
- Pappas, Paul Constantine. Jesus' tomb in India : the debate on his death and Resurrection. Berkeley, California: Asian Humanities Press, an imprint of Jain Publishing Company, 1991.

Articles:

- "A Portrait of Early American Journalism West of the Alleghenies" 1969
