= Haidar Malik =

Kashmiri administrator of the Mughals

Haidar Malik Chadurah or Haidar Malik Tsoduyr (died 1627) was an administrator, and soldier in Kashmir in the service of Jahangir, the fourth Mughal Emperor from 1605 until his death in 1627. Haidar Malik wrote the best known Persian-language history of Kashmir (completed 1621) one of several books entitled Tarikh-i-Kashmir, identified as Tarikh-i-Haidar Malik. Malik Muhammad Chadurah was born in Tsodur, a village ten miles south of Srinagar, as the son of Hasan Malik. His history was translated into English as Haidar Malik Chadurah History of Kashmir, Raja Bano, Bhavna Prakashan, 1991.
