= Saadullah Shahabadi =

18th century Kashmiri Historian

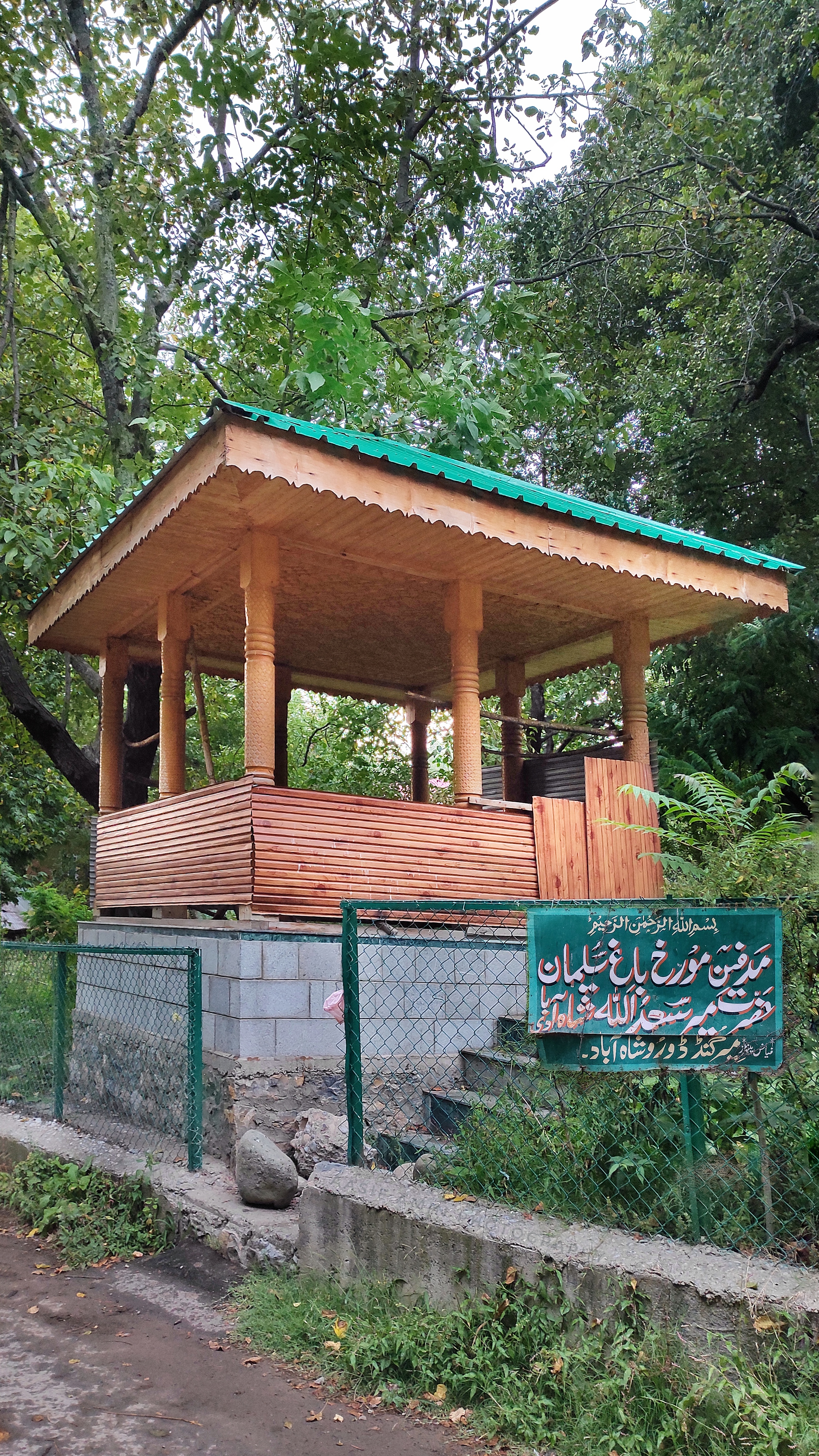
- Grave of Saadullah
- Occupation: Historian
- Notable work: Baagh-i-Sulaiman

Mir Saadullah Shahabadi (Saadullah, pen name)(fl. 1780s) was a Kashmiri poet who wrote a Persian language verse history of Kashmir called Bagh-i-Sulaiman (Garden of Solomon, 1780). It is mainly derived from the earlier History of Kashmir of Muhammed Azam Didamari, but updates the history to the reign of Juma Khan (1787–1793 CE). His father Shah Majnoon was from Badakhshan and his mother from one of the Kabul villages. They migrated to Kashmir and settled in the Aaragam village of Bandipora. In one of his verses, Saadullah mentions that he became an orphan at the age of eleven and found himself in the state of abject poverty. He received the guidance and education from the teacher named Abul-Baqa, which left an indelible mark on his life. Shahabadi is said to have lived through the Afghan rule era and died in 1789.
