= Nabi Khanyari =

Ghulam Nabi Shah Khaniyari (fl. 1850s) also Mufti Ghulam Nabi and Naba Shah was a Kashmiri historian of Kashmir. His Wajeez-ut-Tawarikh (1857) gives information on the society, economics and political history of the Sikh period and earlier part of the Dogra rule in Kashmir.
