= Howard Walter =

American minister, author, and hymnwriter (1883–1918)

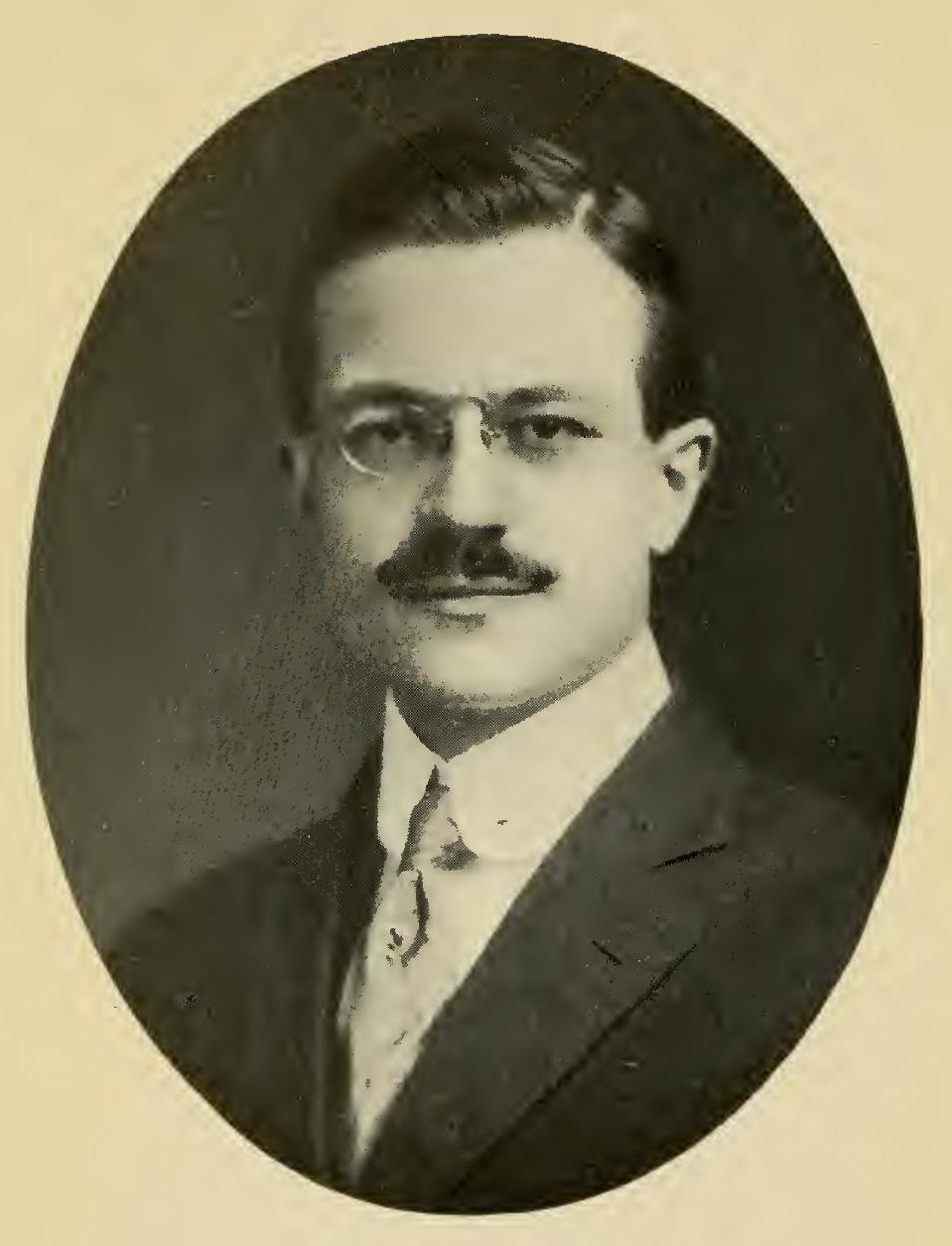
- Undated photo of Howard Walter
- Born: Howard Arnold Walter; August 19, 1883; New Britain, Connecticut, US
- Died: November 1, 1918 (aged 35); Lahore, British Raj
- Burial place: Indian Christian Cemetery; Lahore, British Raj
- Education: Princeton University (1905); Hartford Seminary
- Occupations: Minister; author; hymnwriter
- Notable work: "My Creed" ("I Would Be True")
- Spouse: Marguerite B. Darlington (m. 1910)

Signature
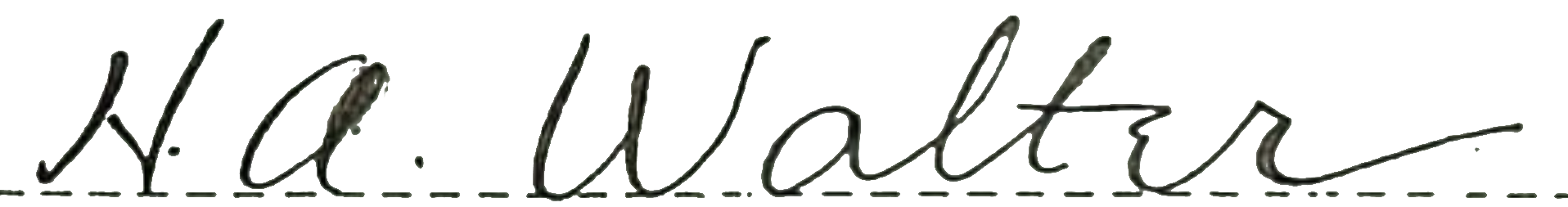

Howard Arnold Walter (August 19, 1883 – November 1, 1918) was an American Congregationalist minister, author, and hymnwriter.

Born in New Britain, Connecticut, on August 19, 1883, Howard Arnold Walter was the son of Henry S. Walter, superintendent of the Stanley Rule & Level Company. Walter graduated from Princeton University in 1905, and in 1906, he traveled to the Empire of Japan to teach English at Waseda University. There he wrote his mother a poem on his philosophy of life ("My Creed"), which became the hymn "I Would Be True" years after she submitted it to Harper's Magazine. When Walter returned to the US, he studied at Hartford Seminary, was ordained a Congregationalist minister, and was an assistant minister in Asylum Hill, Connecticut, for three years.

Walter married Marguerite B. Darlington on November 21, 1910, in a Brooklyn, New York, service officiated by James Henry Darlington. On November 17, 1911, Marion D. Walter was born to the couple in Hartford, Connecticut. In 1913, the family traveled to Lahore in the British Raj to allow Walter to teach and proselyte the Mohammedans there. Two years later on April 7, 1914, Ruth A. Walter was born in Lahore.

Walter died of the Spanish flu in Lahore on November 1, 1918; he was buried there in the Indian Christian Cemetery, plot 211. His book The Religious Life of India: The Ahmadīya Movement was published posthumously.

== Works ==
- Walter, Howard A. (May 1907). "I Would Be True". Harper's Magazine. ISSN 0017-789X.
- Walter, Howard Arnold (1912). My Creed and Other Poems. Boston: The Gorham Press. LCCN 13000096 – via Internet Archive.
- Walter, H. A. (1918). Farquhar, J. N.; Macnicol, Nicol (eds.). The Religious Life of India: The Ahmadīya Movement. Calcutta: Association Press – via Internet Archive.
- Walter, H. A. (1919). Soul Surgery: Some Thoughts on Incisive Personal Work (second ed.). Calcutta: Association Press. OCLC 1085228839 – via Internet Archive.
