= Günter Grönbold =

German Indologist and Tibetologist

Günter Grönbold (Munich, 18 September 1943) is a German Indologist and Tibetologist. He was head of the Oriental Section at the Bayerische Staatsbibliothek Munich. He is an authority on the Pāli Canon and the Buddhist art of the Silk Road and has translated various Sanskrit and Tibetan texts into German.

He is best known outside the field of Tibetology and Indology for a side step from his work in Buddhist texts to review the evidence for the belief of a visit of Jesus in India and the Roza Bal "tomb of Jesus" in Srinagar taught as part of Jesus in Ahmadiyya Islam - which Grönbold critically refutes.

== Works ==
- Sad-anga-Yoga
- Materialien zur Geschichte des Sadahga-Yoga: III.
- Der buddhistische Kanon: eine Bibliographie, Otto Harrassowitz, Wiesbaden, 1984
- Jesus in Indien. Das Ende einer Legende. Kösel, München, 1985
