= Norbert Klatt =

German Buddhist and Christian scholar

Norbert Klatt (24 December 1949 – 1 October 2015) was a German scholar of Buddhism and Christianity and publisher; he was the founder of Norbert Klatt Verlag, Göttingen.

Klatt proposed Buddhist influence on some New Testament narratives (1982), particularly the conversion of Kassapa (Mahavagga 1.20.16) on Jesus walking on the water (Mark 6). From 1986 Klatt made investigations into the Life of Issa forgery of Nicolas Notovitch expanding his researches to include Mirza Ghulam Ahmad's claims of Jesus in India in 1988. Klatt concluded that the origin of Notovitch's story was "to be sought in Paris rather than India, Tibet or Ladakh," but left open the possibility that Notovitch had genuinely found Tibetan texts relating to Jesus misidentifying Bible portions that Heinrich August Jäschke had translated into Tibetan in 1857–1868, decades before Notovitch's visit to Tibet.

== Works ==
=== Books ===
- Johann Friedrich Blumenbach - editor of 5 volumes of Blumenbach Correspondence
- Literarkritische Beiträge zum Problem christlich-buddhistischer Parallelen - Köln : Brill, 1982
- Lebte Jesus in Indien? - Göttingen : Wallstein-Verlag, 1988
- Jesu und Buddhas Wasserwandel - Göttingen : Klatt, 1990 (revision of 1982)
- Die Bosheit der Sexualität - Göttingen : Klatt, 1991
- Der Nachlass von Wilhelm Hübbe-Schleiden in der Niedersächsischen Staats- und Universitätsbibliothek Göttingen - Göttingen : Klatt, 1996
- Verflucht, versklavt, verketzert Göttingen : Klatt, 1998
- Zur Verwendung des Sektenbegriffs in Religion, Politik und Wirtschaft - Göttingen : Klatt, 1999
- Die Rivalin Gottes Göttingen : Klatt, 2000
- Zur Instrumentalisierung der "Homosexualität" im Alten und Neuen Testament, Göttingen : Klatt, 2006

=== Articles ===
- N. Klatt, 'Jesus in Indien', in Orientierungen und Berichte 13, 1986 (Evgl. Zentralstelle fur Weltanschauungsfragen).
