= Substitution hypothesis =

Theory regarding Jesus Christ

The substitution hypothesis or twin hypothesis states that the sightings of a risen Jesus are explained not by physical resurrection, but by the existence of a different person, a twin or lookalike who could have impersonated Jesus after his death, or died in the place of Jesus on the cross. It is a position held by some Gnostics in the first to third century, as well as some modern Mandaeans and Muslims and a few skeptics.

== Christian and Gnostic traditions ==
The Book of Thomas the Contender, a Gnostic text thought to have been written in the late second or the third century, cites Jesus as stating, when speaking to Thomas the Apostle, "[I]t has been said that you are my twin and true companion.". Additionally, the third century text Acts of Thomas (not to be confused with the Gospel of Thomas) contains an episode in which the risen Jesus appears "in the likeness of" Thomas the Apostle, and is subsequently mistaken for Thomas by a king. However, these early texts do not expressly put forward any sort of substitution hypothesis with respect to the death and resurrection of Jesus.

The Second Treatise of the Great Seth, a Gnostic text from the third century, claims that Simon of Cyrene was crucified in the place of Jesus. The text is written from the first-person narrative perspective of Jesus, attributing to Jesus statements such as "I was laughing at their ignorance" when the crowd mistakenly crucifies Simon of Cyrene, and asserting that this deception was made possible because "I [Jesus] was altering my shapes, changing from form to form."

The Gospel of Barnabas describes Jesus escaping crucifixion through being raised alive to heaven by a committee of holy angels; afterwards, Judas Iscariot is supernaturally transformed to look identical to Jesus, and is subsequently crucified in Jesus' place. Concerning its date of composition, few academics argue that the Gospel of Barnabas was composed any earlier than the 14th century, although a minority of scholars see it as containing portions of an earlier work.

Paul William Roberts reports in his 1995 travel narrative Journey of the Magi: In Search of the Birth of Jesus, that some contemporary Mandaeans hold that Thomas the Apostle was the twin brother of Jesus and was crucified in Jesus' place.

== Islamic perspective ==
A verse in the Qur'an saying of Jesus that "they killed him not, nor crucified him, but so it was made to appear to them" has been interpreted by many Muslims to mean that a different man who only appeared to be Jesus died in his place. Muslim scholars do not agree on the identity of the substitute, but he is often thought to have been one of the Apostles (most often, Judas) or Simon of Cyrene.

For example, in Fakhr al-Dīn al-Rāzī's commentary in Mafātīḥ al-Ghayb, Tafsir Al-Kabr, Al-Rāzī rejects the versions where a loyal or innocent disciple (or a volunteer) is made to look like Jesus and killed. He argues that such an outcome would amount to God permitting the deception of the righteous, which runs counter to divine justice and wisdom and is deeply cautious about relying on unverified historical reports (Isrā'īliyyāt) that confuse the core message. Al-Rāzī maintains the orthodox Islamic theological position that God protected Jesus bodily and raised him up, completely invalidating the claim of his execution by enemies, while critically sifting through the legendary details attached to the substitution accounts..

== See also ==
- Swoon hypothesis
- Vision hypothesis
- Stolen body hypothesis
- The Gospel of Afranius
- Historical Jesus
- Historicity of Jesus
- Religious perspectives on Jesus
- Unknown years of Jesus
- Holger Kersten
- Basilidians
- Gospel of Basilides
- Alleged Tomb of Jesus at Shingō, Aomori
