= Swoon hypothesis =

Skepticism toward Jesus's resurrection

The swoon hypothesis is any of a number of ideas that aim to explain the resurrection of Jesus, proposing that Jesus did not die on the cross, but merely fell unconscious ("swooned"), and was later revived in the tomb. According to the proponents of the swoon hypothesis, the appearances of the risen Jesus to his disciples following his resurrection from the dead were merely perceived to be resurrection appearances by his followers; proponents of the swoon hypothesis believe that Jesus allegedly fell unconscious ("swooned") on the cross, survived the crucifixion, and then regained enough strength to appear before them while he was still alive.

This and other similar theories about the resurrection of Jesus and witnesses to his resurrection became popular in the Western world after they were first proposed by some 18th–19th century Western authors and philosophers, including Oscar Wilde and Friedrich Schleiermacher; however, since the last decade of the 19th century, all of them have been discarded as baseless and unacceptable by the majority of biblical scholars and academics. This 200-year-old hypothesis continues to be the subject of debate in popular circles, but the biblical scholarly literature considers it uncontroversial that Jesus died during his crucifixion.

== 18th and 19th centuries ==
Early proponents of this hypothesis include German Karl Friedrich Bahrdt, who suggested in around 1780 that Jesus deliberately feigned his death, using drugs provided by the physician Luke to appear as a spiritual messiah and get Israel to abandon the idea of a political messiah. In this interpretation of the events described in the Gospels, Jesus was resuscitated by Joseph of Arimathea, with whom he shared a connection through a secret order of the Essenes.

Around 1800, Karl Venturini proposed that a group of supporters dressed in white—who were, with Jesus, members of a "secret society"—had not expected him to survive the crucifixion, but heard groaning from inside the tomb, where Jesus had regained consciousness in the cool, damp air. They then frightened away the guards and rescued him.

A third rationalist theologian, Heinrich Paulus, wrote in works from 1802 onwards that he believed that Jesus had fallen into a temporary coma and somehow revived without help in the tomb. He was critical of the vision hypothesis and argued that the disciples must have believed that God had resurrected Jesus. Friedrich Schleiermacher endorsed a form of Paulus' hypothesis in the early 1830s.

== 20th century ==
Though abandoned by modern scholars as a fringe theory, the hypothesis has remained popular in various works of pseudohistory, such as Michael Baigent, Richard Leigh and Henry Lincoln's 1982 book Holy Blood, Holy Grail, Barbara Thiering's 1992 Jesus and the Riddle of the Dead Sea Scrolls, and Michael Baigent's 2006 The Jesus Papers.

British biblical scholar Hugh J. Schonfield in his 1965 book The Passover Plot, lays out his elaborate theory that the entire crucifixion was meticulously planned and choreographed by Jesus himself, including the timing of various events leading up to it, such that a mere few hours stay on the cross would ensue before the Sabbath arrived. And while on the cross, one of his supporters, who was on hand, would give him water (to quench his thirst) that was laced with a drug to make him unconscious; and that Joseph of Arimathea, a well-connected supporter, would collect him off the cross while still alive (but appearing dead) so that he could be secretly nursed back to health.

A fuller list of proponents of various swoon hypotheses:

Name	Date	Book	Reference
Karl Friedrich Bahrdt	1782	Briefe über die Bibel im Volkston: Eine Wochenschrift von einem Prediger auf dem Lande (Popular Letters about the Bible: A weekly paper by a country clergyman)	
Karl Heinrich Venturini	1800	Natürliche Geschichte des grossen Propheten von Nazareth (A Non-supernatural History of the Great Prophet of Nazareth)	
Heinrich Paulus	1828	Das Leben Jesu als Grundlage einer reinen Geschichte des Urchristentums (The Life of Jesus as the Basis of a purely Historical Account of Early Christianity)	
Mirza Ghulam Ahmad	1899	Jesus in India	
Henry Leffmann	1904	The Mental Condition and Career of Jesus of Nazareth	
Ernest Brougham Docker	1920	If Jesus Did Not Die on the Cross	
Harvey Spencer Lewis	1929	The Mystical Life of Jesus	
Werner Hegemann	1933	Christ Rescued	
Sufi M. R. Bengalee	1946	The Tomb of Jesus	
Khwaja Nazir Ahmad	1952	Jesus in Heaven on Earth	
Robert Graves and Joshua Podro	1957	Jesus in Rome	
Hugh J. Schonfield	1965	The Passover Plot	
Raymond W. Bernard	1966	The Secret Life of Jesus the Essene	
Aziz Kashmiri	1968	Christ in Kashmir	
Donovan Joyce	1972	The Jesus Scroll	
Andreas Faber-Kaiser	1977	Jesus Died in Kashmir	
Michael Baigent, Richard Leigh and Henry Lincoln	1982	The Holy Blood and the Holy Grail	
J.D.M. Derrett	1982	The Anastasis: The Resurrection of Jesus as an Historical Event	
Paul C. Pappas	1991	Jesus' Tomb in India: The Debate on His Death and Resurrection	
Fida Muhammad Hassnain	1994	A Search for the Historical Jesus	
Holger Kersten	1994	Jesus Lived in India	
Barbara Thiering	1994	Jesus the Man	
Kenneth V. Hosking	1995	Yeshua the Nazorean: The Teacher of Righteousness	
Abubakr Ben Ishmael Salahuddin	2001	Saving the Savior: Did Christ Survive the Crucifixion?	
Lena Einhorn	2007	The Jesus Mystery	
Johannes Fried	2019	Kein Tod auf Golgatha	

=== Rajneesh movement ===
Indian Philosopher Rajneesh has also argued that Jesus survived the crucifixion and his argument is similar to the swoon hypothesis.

=== Islamic perspectives ===
A big proponent of the swoon hypothesis in the modern era would be Muslim preacher Ahmed Deedat of South Africa, whose book Crucifixion or Cruci-fiction has been widely printed and distributed all over the Muslim world. He takes a critical look at the events in the four Gospels and theorizes an alternative scenario of what really happened, a scenario very similar to the swoon hypothesis.

Another contemporary Muslim scholar, Zakir Naik, also used these hypotheses in a debate with Pastor Ruknuddin Henry Pio.

The actual Islamic position on the subject of crucifixion more closely resembles the Substitution hypothesis, highlighted in verse of the Qur'an: "and for their saying, 'We killed the Messiah, Jesus, son of Mary, the messenger of Allah.' But they did not kill him nor did they crucify him, but it was made to appear to them so. Even those who dispute about it are in doubt; they have no certain knowledge other than conjecture. But they certainly did not kill him."

=== Ahmadiyya perspective ===
According to the late 19th century writings of Mirza Ghulam Ahmad, the founder of the Ahmadiyya movement, the theological basis of the Ahmadi belief is that Jesus was only "in a swoon" when he was taken down from the cross. Ahmad argued that when Jesus was taken down from the cross, he had lapsed into a state similar to Jonah's state of "swoon" in the belly of a fish. Mirza Ghulam Ahmad interpreted the phrase in Deuteronomy 21:23: kī qilelat Elohim taluy, "… for a hanged man is the curse of God", as suggesting that "God would never allow one of His true prophets to be brutally killed in such a degrading manner as crucifixion". Following his ordeal, Jesus was cured of his wounds with a special 'ointment of Jesus' (marham-i ʿIsā)."

== Supporting arguments ==
=== Short stay of Jesus on the cross ===
It was uncommon for a crucified healthy adult to die in the time described by the Gospels; the Gospel of Mark reports that Jesus was crucified at nine in the morning and died at three in the afternoon, or six hours after the crucifixion. Pilate was surprised to hear that Jesus had died so soon (Mark 15:44). The average time of suffering before death by crucifixion is claimed by some to have been observed to be 2–4 days; moreover, the 17th century philosopher Justus Lipsius claimed that victims of crucifixion survived for as long as 9 days.

The precise duration of crucifixion until death occurs would depend on the type of crucifixion, the amount of blood loss already inflicted from the flogging and scourging performed beforehand, and the general physical health of the individual being executed.

Modern scholarship has also cast some doubt on the generally agreed depiction of Jesus being nailed to a cross, as opposed to the more common method of having a victim's hands and feet being tied to a cross. This skepticism arises from the fact that none of the gospels make any mention of Jesus being nailed to the cross, but it is assumed that this is what transpired, based on the reporting of wounds in the hands of the risen Jesus. The mention of the wounds itself is only found in the Gospel of John.

=== Lack of eyewitness accounts of Jesus' dead body ===
Jesus' dead body, as per the Gospel narratives, is not reported to be seen by eyewitnesses after his crucifixion. No elaborate funeral arrangements and no public viewing of the corpse are recorded to have taken place. Jesus' body is removed from the cross into the custody of his executioner, Pontius Pilate. Soon thereafter, Jesus' body is given by Pilate to a member of the Jewish council, Joseph of Arimathea, a wealthy man and a secret follower of Jesus. Joseph of Arimathea, along with a Pharisee named Nicodemus, wrap Jesus' body in linen and transport the body to a nearby, stone-covered burial chamber.

Jewish religious law (halacha) forbids embalming, and therefore Jews generally bury their dead as soon as possible: "Jewish burials take place as quickly as possible, following a principle of honoring the dead (k'vod hamet).

The transfer of Jesus' body by the local authorities into the hands of a rich influential follower and execution of a quick burial lend support to the swoon hypothesis, allowing a swooned Jesus to be removed from the cross, quickly hidden away from public scrutiny with room to recover from his ordeal in an above ground burial chamber on private property.

== Counter-arguments ==
In contrast, modern skeptics of swooning claims, such as diagnostician Dr. Alexander Metherell, assert that Jesus having survived crucifixion is "impossible" and "a fanciful theory without any possible basis in fact." Further example may be found in a thorough analysis conducted by the Journal of the American Medical Association, which concluded Jesus was very probably dead even prior to the spear being thrust into his side, and that any swoon hypothesis is entirely irreconcilable with contemporary medical science.

=== Jesus' state of health ===
The swoon hypothesis has been criticized by many, including medical experts who, based on the account given in the New Testament, conclude that Jesus was definitively dead when removed from the cross. Many others consider it unlikely that Jesus would be capable of inspiring faith in those who saw him after barely surviving a crucifixion, including the 19th century rationalist theologian David Strauss, who wrote: "It is impossible that a being who had stolen half dead out of the sepulchre, who crept about weak and ill and wanting medical treatment... could have given the disciples the impression that he was a conqueror over death and the grave, the Prince of life: an impression that lay at the bottom of their future ministry."

=== Medical arguments ===
Medical authorities W. D. Edwards, W. J. Gabel and F. E. Hosmer offered the following analysis in regard to the New Testament Greek and the medical data:

Jesus of Nazareth underwent Jewish and Roman trials, was flogged, and was sentenced to death by crucifixion. The scourging produced deep stripelike lacerations and appreciable blood loss, and it probably set the stage for hypovolemic shock, as evidenced by the fact that Jesus was too weakened to carry the crossbar (patibulum) to Golgotha. At the site of crucifixion, his wrists were nailed to the patibulum and, after the patibulum was lifted onto the upright post (stipes), his feet were nailed to the stipes. The major pathophysiologic effect of crucifixion was an interference with normal respirations. Accordingly, death resulted primarily from hypovolemic shock and exhaustion asphyxia. Jesus' death was ensured by the thrust of a soldier's spear into his side. Modern medical interpretation of the historical evidence indicates that Jesus was dead when taken down from the cross.

Forensic pathologist Frederick T. Zugibe has described the swoon hypothesis as completely unfounded and contradicted by medical evidence. According to Zugibe the long spikes that penetrated Jesus' feet would have caused massive swelling and severe pain beginning in the first hour on the cross and over the next few days would have been massively swollen and infected beyond any immediate healing capability. Jesus would not have been able to stand or walk on his feet for at least a month or longer. Zugibe argued that it was not possible for Jesus to have survived his crucifixion and no drugs or medications of the time would have been able to stop the pain Jesus had experienced or put him into a deep sleep to feign death.

== See also ==
- Basilidians
- Gospel of Basilides
- Empty tomb
- Historical Jesus
- Historicity of Jesus
- Islamic view of Jesus' death
- Religious perspectives on Jesus
- Stolen body hypothesis
- Substitution hypothesis
- Unknown years of Jesus
