= Holger Kersten =

German writer (born 1951)

- Born: 1951 (age 74–75); Magdeburg
- Occupation: Writer
- Writing career
- Language: German
- Subject: Speculation on the life of Jesus Christ
- Notable work: Jesus Lived in India

Holger Kersten (born 1951) is a German writer on myth, legend, religion, and esoteric subjects. He is best known for speculative books about time Jesus spent in India. Kersten's views have received no support from mainstream scholarship.

== Jesus Lived in India (1983) ==
Jesus Lived in India promotes the claim of Nicolas Notovitch (1894) regarding the unknown years of Jesus between the ages of twelve and twenty-nine, supposedly spent in India. The consensus view amongst modern scholars is that Notovitch's account of the travels of Jesus to India was a hoax. Kersten also promotes Ahmadiyya founder Ghulam Ahmad's claims regarding time spent by Jesus in India between the age of 33 and 120, and his burial at the Roza Bal shrine in Srinagar. Kersten additionally draws on earlier material by Louis Jacolliot, Andreas Faber-Kaiser, and German novelist Siegfried Obermeier (1983). The book was translated into Chinese in 1987.

Like others before him, Kersten follows Mirza Ghulam Ahmad in his sources, such as a passage in the Bhavishya Purana, which refers to Jesus as "Isa-Masih" (Jesus the Messiah). The passage describes the Hindu king Shalivahana travelling to mountains, where he meets a man who calls himself Isa, son of a virgin. Isa says he has ministered to the Mlecchas, explaining that he has reformed their lives by recommending principles of mental purity, using japa by chanting holy names, and meditation. Kersten interprets this as a record of Jesus in Kashmir. In reality, the passage is an 18th-century dialogue also featuring Muhammad, and not an early source, as Ahmad claimed. Most scholars consider this part of the Purana to be a 19th-century interpolation.

The book achieved great popularity in Germany and overseas, though it competed with the better-known Obermeier's book in Germany. Indologist Günter Grönbold included a highly critical debunking of Obermeier and Kersten's interpretations of Buddhist sources among various expositions of Jesus in India theories in Jesus in Indien. Das Ende einer Legende (Jesus in India, the end of a Legend, 1985). Wilhelm Schneemelcher, in introducing the subject of New Testament Apocrypha (1991), uses Kersten by way of illustration of the development of legendary Gospel traditions and notes how Kersten "attempted to work up Notovitch and Ahmadiyya legends, with many other alleged witnesses, into a complete picture." Douglas T. McGetchin notes that once his story had been re-examined by historians, Notovitch confessed to having fabricated the evidence.

However, in 1922, Swami Abhedananda visited the Hemis Monastery in Ladakh, India, and corroborated much of Notovitch's story. Given access to the manuscripts on Jesus Christ, Abhedananda later published an abbreviated version of Notovich's translated account. After Abhedananda's death in 1939, one of his disciples inquired about the documents at the monastery but was told they had disappeared.

== The Original Jesus (1994) ==
In a later work, co-written with parapsychologist Elmar R. Gruber (b. 1955), Der Ur-Jesus (1994), translated as The Original Jesus (1995), Kersten argues that Buddhism appears to have had a substantial influence on the life and teachings of Jesus. They hold that Jesus was influenced by the teachings and practices of Therapeutae, described by the authors as teachers of the Buddhist Theravada school then living in Judaea, although the only account of this group, an extensive description by Philo of Alexandria, describes the Therapeutae as a charismatic Hellenistic Jewish community following the Law of Moses. Gruber and Kersten assert that Jesus lived the life of a Buddhist and taught Buddhist ideals to his disciples. In doing so, their work draws on earlier comparisons between Buddhism and Christianity, including that of Oxford New Testament scholar Burnett Hillman Streeter (1932), who argued that the moral teachings of the Gautama Buddha hold four remarkable resemblances to the Sermon on the Mount.

== The Jesus Conspiracy (1997) ==
Kersten and Gruber later developed the ideas of the two earlier books and connected them to the Turin Shroud in Das Jesus-Komplott: die Wahrheit über das Turiner Grabtuch – The Jesus Conspiracy: The Turin Shroud and the Truth About the Resurrection. and Jesus starb nicht am Kreuz — Die Botschaft des Turiner Grabtuchs (1998) (Jesus Did Not Die on the Cross: The Message of the Shroud of Turin). The Jesus Conspiracy proposes that the Vatican interfered with the 1988 Radiocarbon 14 dating of the Shroud of Turin to show a medieval date for its origin. The authors propose that the shroud is the authentic burial cloth of Jesus, but that evidence, including blood tracks, shows that Jesus was alive following his crucifixion. They argue that the Mandylion, or Image of Edessa, known from the sixth century, was the shroud, but folded to only show the face of Jesus. Because Jesus surviving the cross would contradict the teaching of the Resurrection, the central belief in Christianity, the authors allege that the Vatican used a piece from a 13th-century cloth with a similar herringbone weave to the Shroud of Turin as a substitute in the carbon dating. In part three, Gruber attempts to explain many details concerning what happened in "that dramatic hour of Good Friday". The book repeats Kersten's earlier arguments that after the crucifixion, Jesus moved to India.

== Critical response ==
None of Kersten's works have found any support in mainstream scholarship — either Biblical or Indologist. Noted German scholar of New Testament Apocrypha Wilhelm Schneemelcher, in a revision of his standard work prior to his death in 2003, and in unusually strong language for the scholarly community, states that Kersten's work is based on "fantasy, untruth and ignorance (above all in the linguistic area)" and "has nothing to do with historical research." Gerald O'Collins and Daniel Kendall opined that "Kersten's discredited book" is simply the repackaging of Notovich and Ahmad's material for consumption by the general public.

== Bibliography ==
- Jesus Lived in India (1983)
- The Original Jesus (1994)
- The Jesus Conspiracy (1997)
- Jesus starb nicht am Kreuz — Die Botschaft des Turiner Grabtuchs (1998)

== See also ==
- Swoon hypothesis
- Substitution hypothesis
- Basilidians
- Gospel of Basilides
- Islamic view of Jesus' death
