= Nicolas Notovitch =

Russian journalist

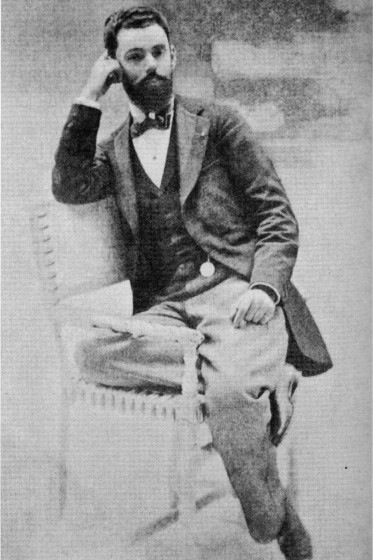
Notovitch, date and location unclear.

Shulim or Nikolai Aleksandrovich Notovich (Russian: Николай Александрович Нотович; August 13, 1858 – after 1934), known in the West as Nicolas Notovitch, was a Crimean Jewish adventurer who claimed to be a Russian aristocrat, spy and journalist.

Notovitch is known for his 1894 book claiming that during the unknown years of Jesus, he left Galilee for India and studied with Buddhists and Hindus before returning to Judea. Notovitch's claim was based on a document he said he had seen at the Hemis Monastery while he stayed there. The consensus view amongst modern scholars is that Notovitch's account of the travels of Jesus to India was a hoax.

Notovitch also wrote some political books on the role of Russia in war.

== Life of Saint Issa ==
According to Notovitch's writing, after breaking his leg in India and while recovering from it at the Hemis Monastery in Ladakh, he learned of the Tibetan manuscript Life of Saint Issa, Best of the Sons of Men (Isa being the Arabic name of Jesus in Islam). Notovitch's account and the supposed translation of the alleged manuscript were published in French in 1894 as La vie inconnue de Jésus-Christ (The Unknown Life of Jesus Christ). It was translated into English, German, Spanish, and Italian. The account claims that during his unknown years, Jesus left Galilee for India and studied with Buddhists and Hindus there before returning to Judea.

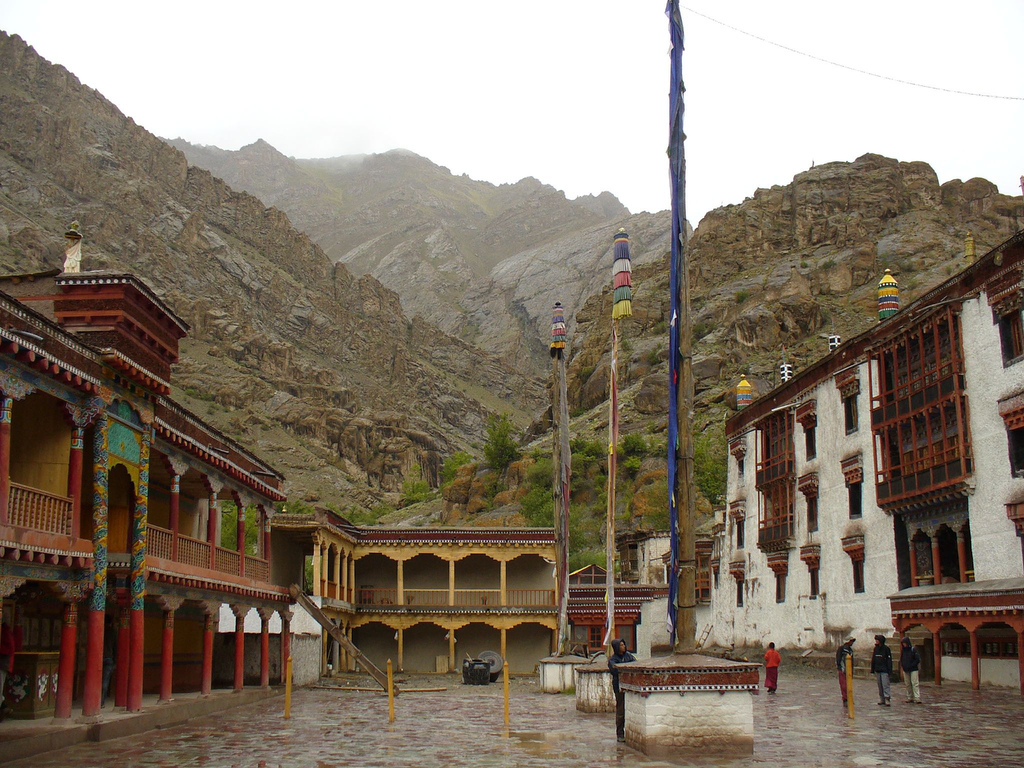
Hemis Monastery in 2006

=== Allegations of forgery and alleged confession ===
Notovitch's book generated controversy as soon as it was published. Although Francis Younghusband corroborated that he encountered Notovitch near Skardu after the latter had visited Kashmir, this was before he went to the monastery. The philologist Max Müller expressed incredulity at Notovitch's account and suggested that either the author was the victim of a practical joke or had fabricated the evidence, writing: "Taking it for granted that M. Notovitch is ... not a liar, we cannot help thinking that the Buddhist monks of Ladakh and Tibet must be wags, who enjoy mystifying inquisitive travelers, and that M. Notovitch fell far too easy a victim to their jokes." Müller then wrote to the head lama at Hemis Monastery to ask about Notovitch's story. The head lama replied that there had been no Western visitor at the monastery in the previous 15 years, during which time he had been the head lama, and that there was no such manuscript. J. Archibald Douglas, who was a professor of English and History at the Government College in Agra, visited the monastery in 1895 to interview the head lama, who again stated that Notovitch had never been there and that no such writings existed.

Other European scholars also opposed Notovitch's account and Indologist Leopold von Schroeder called the story a "big fat lie". Wilhelm Schneemelcher upheld that Notovich's accounts were quickly exposed as fabrications, and that to date no one else had ever glimpsed the alleged documents. Notovich initially defended his story, but upon further scrutiny allegedly confessed to fabricating the evidence. Kashmiri writer Fida Hassnain explains Notovich's defense of his account, stating:

Notovitch responded publicly by announcing his existence, along with the names of people he met on his travels in Kashmir and Ladakh. ... He also offered to return to Tibet in company of recognized orientalists to verify the authenticity of the verses contained in his compilation. In the French journal La Paix, he affirmed his belief in the Orthodox Church, and advised his detractors to restrict themselves to the simple issue of the existence of the Buddhist scrolls at Hemis.

Bart D. Ehrman, a Biblical scholar, says that "Today there is not a single recognized scholar on the planet who has any doubts about the matter. The entire story was invented by Notovitch, who earned a good deal of money and a substantial amount of notoriety for his hoax."

=== Indian claims of corroboration ===
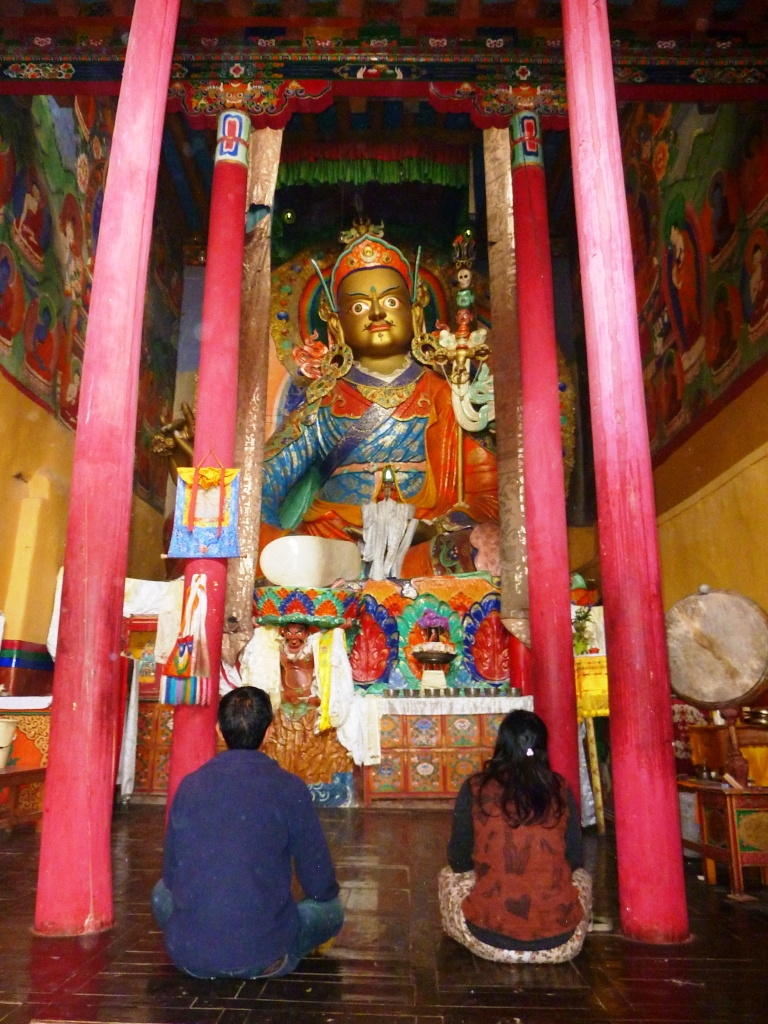
Pilgrims at Hemis Monastery

Swami Abhedananda, who was a colleague of Max Mueller and initially sceptical of Notovitch's claims, claimed to have visited the Hemis Monastery in 1922 whilst travelling through Kashmir and Tibet to verify the reports of Notovich that he had heard the previous year in the U.S. He claimed that lamas at the monastery confirmed to him that Notovich was brought to the monastery with a broken leg and he was nursed there for a month and a half. They also told him that the Tibetan manuscript on Issa was shown to Notovich and its contents interpreted so that he could translate them into Russian. This manuscript was shown to Abhedananda, which had 14 chapters, containing 223 couplets (slokas). The Swami had some portions of the manuscript translated with the help of a lama, about 40 verses of which appeared in the Swami's travelogue. (Note: The lamas also told Swami that after his resurrection, Christ secretly came to Kashmir and lived in a monastery surrounded by many disciples. The original manuscript in Pali was prepared "three or four years" after Christ's death, on the basis of reports by local Tibetans and the accounts from wandering merchants regarding his crucifixion.) The original Pali manuscript—allegedly composed after the resurrection of Jesus—was said to be in the monastery of Marbour near Lhasa. After his return to Bengal, the Swami asked his assistant Bhairab Chaitanya to prepare a manuscript of the travelogue based on the notes he had taken. The manuscript was published serially in Visvavani, a monthly publication of the Ramakrishna Vedanta Samiti, in 1927 and subsequently published in a book form in Bengali. The fifth edition of the book in English was published in 1987, which also contains an English translation of Notovich's book as an appendix.

Paramahansa Yogananda wrote that Nicholas Roerich also corroborated Notovich's and Abhedananda's story during his visit to Tibet in the mid-1920s. Yogananda also wrote that "records of Jesus's years in India were preserved in Puri, according to Bharati Krishna Tirtha, and that after leaving Puri, Jesus spent "six years with the Sakya Buddhist sect in ... Nepal and Tibet" before returning to Judea. He added that "the overall value of these records is inestimable in a search for the historical Jesus".

=== Other authors' references ===
Author Alice Dunbar Nelson includes a review of The Unknown Life of Jesus Christ in her 1895 collection Violets and Other Tales. In 1899 Mirza Ghulam Ahmad wrote Jesus in India (published in 1908), claiming that Jesus traveled to India after surviving his crucifixion, but (disagreeing with Notovitch) not before his attempted execution.

Other authors have taken these themes and incorporated it into their own works. For example, in her book The Lost Years of Jesus: Documentary Evidence of Jesus' 17-Year Journey to the East, Elizabeth Clare Prophet asserts that Buddhist manuscripts provide evidence that Jesus traveled to India, Nepal, Ladakh and Tibet. In his book Jesus Lived in India, German author Holger Kersten promoted the ideas of Nicolas Notovich and Mirza Ghulam Ahmad. Gerald O'Collins classified Kersten's work as the repackaging of the same stories. In his 2002 comedic novel Lamb: The Gospel According to Biff, Christ's Childhood Pal, absurdist author Christopher Moore parodies the notion of Jesus travelling to India.

== Other writings ==
In 1906 Notovitch published a book in Russian and French, pleading for Russia's entry into the Triple Entente with France and Britain. It is entitled in French: La Russie et l'alliance anglaise: étude historique et politique. He also wrote biographies of Tsar Nicolas II and Alexander III. He had also written L'Europe à la veille de la guerre.
