= Ernest Brougham Docker =

Australian judge, cricketer and photographer

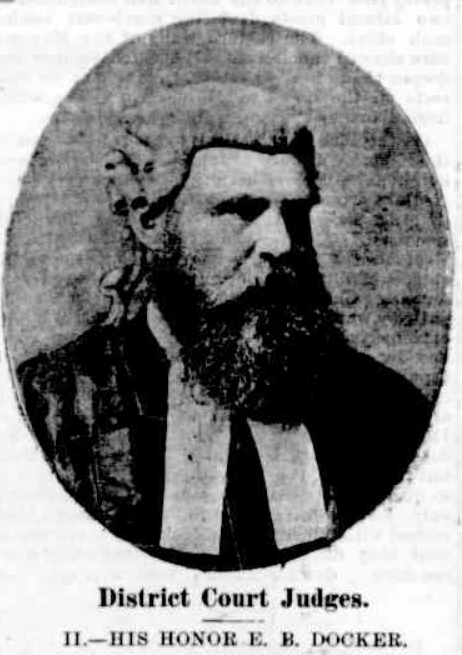

Personal information
- Born: 1 April 1842 "Thornthwaite", Scone, New South Wales, Australia
- Died: 12 August 1923 (aged 81); Elizabeth Bay, New South Wales, Australia
- Source: Cricinfo, 26 December 2016

Ernest Brougham Docker (1 April 1842 – 12 August 1923) was an Australian judge, cricketer and photographer.

== Biography ==
Docker was the oldest son of New South Wales pastoralist and politician Joseph Docker, and his second wife Matilda née Brougham. He was born at his father's estate "Thornthwaite", near Scone, in the Hunter Valley of New South Wales. He graduated B.A. in 1863 and M.A. in 1865 from St Paul's College, University of Sydney.

Docker was a cricketer in his younger days. He played one first-class match for New South Wales in February 1863.

Docker was admitted to the colonial Bar on 28 June 1867. He was crown prosecutor for the northern district (1875), the south-western district (1878), and judge of the District Court and chairman of Quarter Sessions for the north-western district (1881). From 1884 to 1912 he was in the western district. He retired in 1918.

Following the pioneering lead of his father Joseph in this field in Australia, Docker took a great interest in photography. He joined the Royal Society of New South Wales in 1876 and was president of the Photographic Society of New South Wales from 1894 to 1907.

He married Clarissa Mary Tucker in 1873. She died in June 1918. They had seven daughters and two sons. He died at his home in the harbourside suburb of Elizabeth Bay in August 1923, aged 81.

== If Jesus Did Not Die Upon the Cross ==
In 1920 Docker authored If Jesus Did Not Die Upon the Cross, an early work to argue for the swoon hypothesis that Jesus survived his crucifixion. He theorized that Jesus was in a state of catalepsy or self-hypnosis which gave the impression of death. Docker also asserted that the spear thrust by the soldier may have not occurred and Jesus was given clothing by the "gardener" mentioned in John 20:15.

Docker's ideas were rejected by Frederick Zugibe who commented that "there is no valid documentation to support his hypothesis."

== Selected publications ==
- If Jesus Did Not Die Upon the Cross (1920); digitised version at Internet Archive

== See also ==
- List of New South Wales representative cricketers
