= Jesus the Man =

1992 book by Barbara Thiering

Jesus the Man: New Interpretation from the Dead Sea Scrolls
- Cover of the first edition
- Author: Barbara Thiering
- Language: English
- Subject: Jesus
- Publisher: Doubleday
- Publication date: 1992
- Media type: Print
- Pages: 509
- ISBN: 978-0552139502 (paperback edition)
- Preceded by: The Gospels and Qumran
- Followed by: Jesus of the Apocalypse: The Life of Jesus after the Crucifixion

Jesus the Man: New Interpretations from the Dead Sea Scrolls is a book written by the Australian biblical scholar and theologian Barbara Thiering. It was first published by Doubleday in 1992 with the title, Jesus & The Riddle of The Dead Sea Scrolls: Unlocking The Secrets of His Life Story.

Using a decoding tool that the author calls the "pesher technique", she purports to have uncovered evidence in the Gospels themselves that effectively contradicts the story they narrate of Jesus and his mission. She calls this story the "surface meaning" of the Gospels, which is "for 'babes'", in contrast to the hidden meaning. Using this method, Thiering believes she has discovered, among other things, that Jesus was a member of the Essene community, that he survived the crucifixion, and that he married twice.

The book was a bestseller, and has been several times reprinted. Its argument has been widely rejected by theologians in the scholarly community.

== Content ==
The central thesis of the book is that "Jesus was the leader of a radical faction of Essene priests. He was not of virgin birth. He did not die on the Cross. He married Mary Magdalene, fathered a family, and later divorced. He died sometime after AD 64". From the New Testament gospels and Dead Sea Scrolls, Thiering constructs a new history of early Christianity which she contends was hidden in pesher coding. Thiering finds that the biography of Jesus hidden in the New Testament shows him to have been born in Qumran, an Essene community beside the Dead Sea, in March, 7 BC. Robert E. Van Voorst summarizes Thiering's account of the life of Jesus as follows:

He was born out of wedlock to a woman of Qumran's royal-priestly line, befriended outcasts, and performed no miracles. He was crucified with Simon Magus and Judas Iscariot at Qumran, but survived by snake venom that rendered him unconscious. Jesus then married twice, to Mary Magdalene and Lydia of Philippi, fathering three children. After wandering the Mediterranean, he died in obscurity in Rome.

Thiering says Jesus's distinctive ideas arose from the Essenes. In March, 17 AD, he was initiated at the age of 23, and took a political stance in favor of his spiritual "father", Annas the high priest, "who taught peace with Rome and the promotion of Gentiles". He was rebaptized by John the Baptist in March, 29 AD. Thiering says that John is identical to the Essene Teacher of Righteousness, praised in the Dead Sea Scrolls. Jesus soon split from John, becoming one of the leaders of a party "called the Twelve Apostles", some of whom (including Judas Iscariot and Simon Magus) were zealots and others (including Jesus), pacifists. Because of his opposition to John, Jesus is referred to the Dead Sea Scrolls as the Wicked Priest. Thiering examines each of the miracles in the New Testament and finds in them nothing miraculous, but rather events marking turning points in the history of "the Fig Tree", as the movement was called.

Thiering sees Jesus as a prominent member of the Essene movement. His prominence derived from his descent from the Davidic kingship, as well as the efforts of his great-grandfather, said to have been Hillel the Great, and his grandfather, Heli, to establish schools of religious instruction for Jews of the Diaspora. Unlike Simon Magus, the second most important figure in the New Testament according to Thiering, Jesus was a pacifist. He opposed the zealots, calling for a reform and renewal of religion. This would lead to a Jewish empire which would overrule the Roman Empire by its appeal to reason and morality.

== Scholarly reception ==
Thiering's thesis has primarily received scepticism from the academic community. The most detailed discussion of Thiering's book, along with her other writings, is given by N.T. Wright, a former Bishop of Durham, New Testament historian and prominent figure in the historical Jesus debate. Wright debated Thiering in a BBC program in 1992. In his book Who was Jesus? Wright notes that Thiering objected that her claims about Jesus' personal life had been sensationalized by the media. However, he argues that they are the only significantly original aspect of the book. Thiering had already asserted that John the Baptist was identical with the Teacher of Righteousness and that the Gospels were written in code in earlier works. In 1990 she had made a documentary for the Discovery Channel entitled "The Riddle of the Dead Sea Scrolls", in which these views were expressed. Van Voorst describes it as "especially controversial" at the time. Wright notes that Thiering's new ideas about Jesus's family life were first aired in 1990 on an Australian TV show broadcast on Palm Sunday. The resulting furor "attracted the attention of eager publishers" who persuaded her to publish, and to incorporate her earlier theories "in a manner more accessible to the non-scholarly reader".

Wright argues that Thiering is correct to emphasise the humanity of Jesus and to place him in the context of expectations of dramatic divine intervention in history. Wright agrees with Thiering that Jesus offered "a new way of working out what it meant to be the loyal people of God—a way, specifically that avoided the violence that was so endemic in their society". However, he concludes that her way of "redressing the balance" in accounts of Jesus is "totally absurd":

"It is safe to say that no serious scholar has given this elaborate and fantastic theory any credence whatsoever. It is nearly ten years since it was published; the scholarly world has been able to take a good look at it: and the results are totally negative. The only scholar who takes Thiering seriously is Thiering herself."

In their widely acclaimed book on the historical Jesus, biblical scholars James Crossley and Robert J. Myles write that the Dead Sea Scrolls from Qumran are among the best Jewish sources for reconstructing the life of the historical Jesus "because they were collected, written, and interpreted before and around the time of Jesus." However, "no New Testament documents were among the scrolls, and conspiracy theories about them containing coded references to Jesus cannot be taken seriously".

Several writers have compared the book to fantasy fiction. In a critical review of the book's conclusions and methodology, Ancient Historian and New Testament scholar C.B. Forbes concludes that "Her books cannot be described as history. They are extraordinary fantasy, and have been dismissed as such by historians around the world." C. Stephen Evans says the book "clearly borders on fantasy". Florentino García Martínez, the editorial secretary of the Revue de Qumran, has called her work "science fiction", disconnected from all historical and literary reality.

Edna Ullman-Margalit, a former professor at the Hebrew University of Jerusalem, wrote "As an example consider the case of Barbara Thiering. She claims that the scrolls are the product of rivalry between the supporters of John the Baptist, identified with the scrolls’ “Teacher of Righteousness”, and Jesus, identified with the “Man of the Lie”. For my purposes this theory must be considered altogether initially outlandish, given the scientifically definitive dating (based mostly on paleographical and on radiocarbon techniques) of the scrolls to a period well before the birth of Christianity (Thiering, 1992). Thiering's theory, by the way, is a good example of a fringe theory that is popular with the media."

== See also ==
- Historicity of Jesus
