= Jesus in India (book) =

Book written by Mirza Ghulam Ahmad

Book cover of 2003 English edition

Jesus in India (Urdu: مسیح ہندوستان میں; Masīh Hindustān Meiń) is a treatise written by Mirza Ghulam Ahmad, the founder of the Ahmadiyya Movement in 1889. The treatise, which was then published as a book, puts forward the view that Jesus survived crucifixion, left Judea and migrated eastward in order to continue his mission to the 'Lost Tribes of Israel', traveling through Persia and Afghanistan and eventually dying a natural and honourable death in Kashmir at an old age. The book also makes references to several lost Jewish tribes. Ghulam Ahmad applied textual analysis of both the Gospels and Islamic sources – the Quran and hadith – and also drew upon medical and historical material, including what he claimed were ancient Buddhist records, to argue his case. Some modern scholars such as Norbert Klatt (1988) have rejected Ghulam Ahmad's use of these latter sources as misreadings of material unrelated to Jesus.

== Background ==
The book was completed in 1899 and was partly serialised in the Review of Religions in 1902–1903. It was published in book form shortly after Ghulam Ahmad's death in 1908. The first complete English translation was published in 1944.

== Content of the book ==
The treatise suggests that Jesus, having survived crucifixion, discreetly left Roman jurisdiction for the East, starting his journey from Jerusalem and passing through Nisibis and Persia, eventually reaching Afghanistan where he met the Israelite tribes who had settled there after their escape from the bonds of Nebuchadnezzar centuries before. From here he travelled to Kashmir where some Israelite tribes had also settled and lived there until his death at an old age.

Other authors have suggested that the resemblance between Buddhist and Christian teachings and between the lives of Jesus and Buddha as recorded in their respective scriptures indicate that Buddhist teachings must have reached Palestine and been incorporated by Jesus into his own teaching, or that he must have travelled to India pre-crucifixion. Ghulam Ahmad, however, asserts that Jesus reached India only after the crucifixion and that Buddhists later reproduced elements of the Gospels in their scriptures. He argues that Jesus also preached to Buddhist monks, some of whom were originally Jews, who accepted him as a manifestation of the Buddha, the 'promised teacher', and mingled his teachings with Buddha's.

Jesus in India also contains claims on the whereabouts of the Lost Tribes of Israel, suggesting that these tribes were scattered throughout Afghanistan, Kashmir, and Tibet. It also provides a list of tribes of these regions seeking to trace their Israelite roots.

== Alleged discovery ==
Ahmadiyya literature states that one of Ghulam Ahmad's disciples, Khalifa Nur Din (or Noor al-Din) of Jalalpur Jattan, District Gujrat, Pakistan spoke to him about a tomb in Srinagar that was said to be the tomb of a prophet named Yuz Asaf. Ghulam Ahmad instructed him to do some further research into the matter. Nur Din went to Srinagar and stayed there for about four months. He collected information and also obtained the signatures of 556 inhabitants who attested that, according to their traditions, the remains of Jesus Christ lay in the Roza Bal. He also brought back a sketch of the Roza Bal. Thereafter, Ghulam Ahmad decided to send one of his followers, Maulvi Abdullah, to Kashmir to investigate this tomb. Maulvi Abdullah arrived in Kashmir, conducted his investigations, and wrote back to Ghulam Ahmad about his findings. Ghulam Ahmad then published a poster that contained Maulvi Abdullah's letter, as well as Maulvi Abdullah's sketch of the Roza Bal.

Ghulam Ahmad began studying the local traditions of the people of Kashmir, both oral and written, and discovered that these traditions, as mentioned in the letter from Maulvi Abdullah, referred to the Roza Bal as the tomb of Nabi Isa (Prophet Jesus). According to this information, the Muslims in that locality did not believe Jesus to be in heaven, as was taught by the orthodox clergy. The Ahmadiyya publication, Review of Religions, recorded this belief in its October, 1909 edition.

== Modern reception ==
The claims of the book regarding a journey of Jesus to India are rejected or ignored by most scholars. The documents used by Ahmad were reviewed by the German indologist Günter Grönbold in Jesus in Indien. Das Ende einer Legende (Munich, 1985), with Grönbold concluding that Ahmad had misidentified material from the Barlaam and Josaphat texts relating to a Christianized version of the life of Siddhartha Gautama, not of Jesus. Another German scholar Norbert Klatt in Lebte Jesus in Indien? (1988) examined the same Muslim and Christian source texts and came to the same conclusions as Grönbold.

== See also ==
- Jesus in Ahmadiyya Islam
- The Ten Lost Tribes
- The Jesus Conspiracy
- Writings of Mirza Ghulam Ahmad
- Unknown years of Jesus
