= Simon of Cyrene =

Man who was forced by the Romans to carry the cross of Jesus

Saint Simon of Cyrene
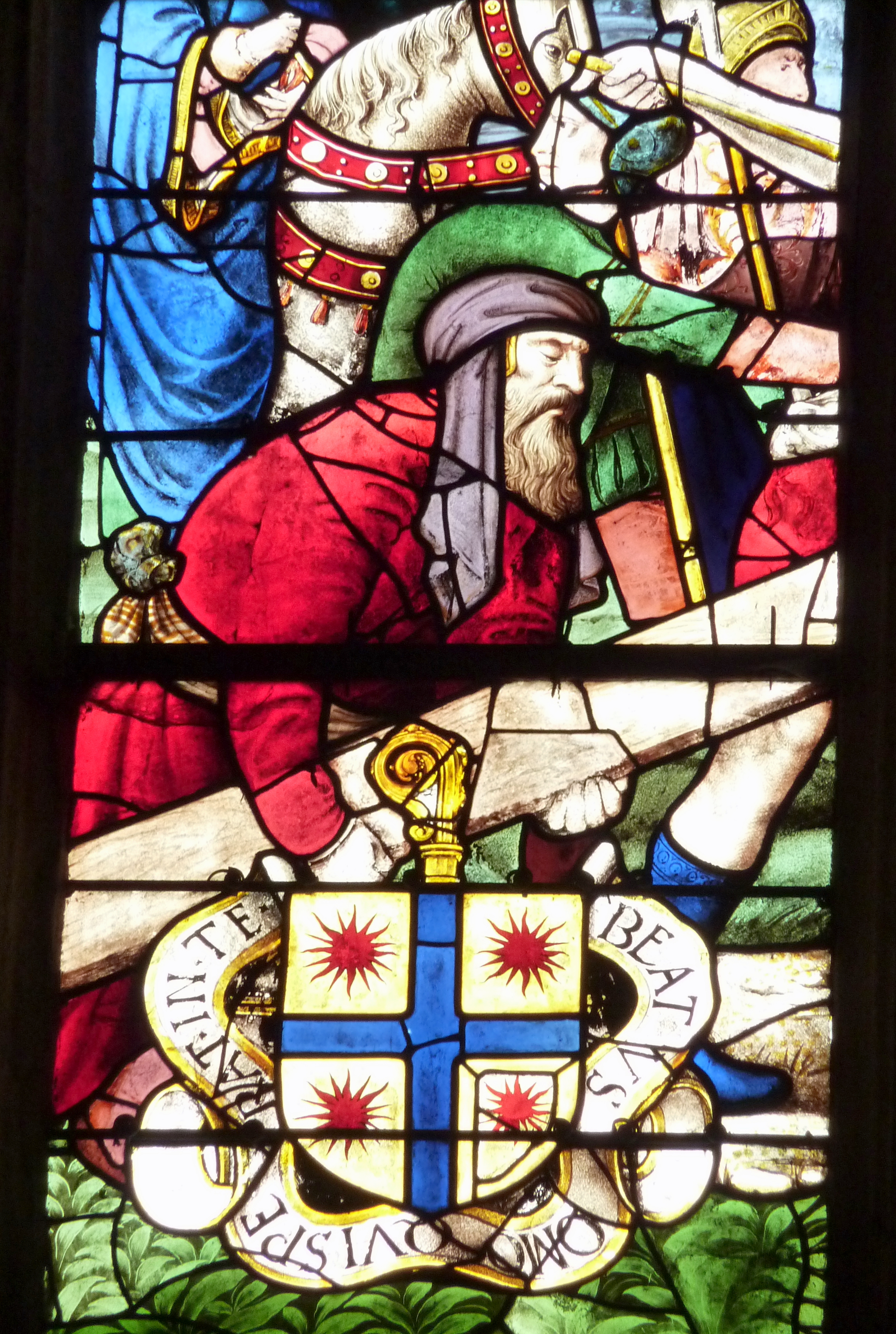
- Simon of Cyrene depicted in a stained glass window at St. Peter's Church in Limours, France
- Venerated in: Eastern Orthodox Church; Catholic Church; Oriental Orthodox Church; Church of the East; Eastern Catholic Churches
- Canonized: Pre-Congregation
- Major shrine: Chapel of Simon of Cyrene, Jerusalem
- Feast: 27 February; 1 December
- Attributes: Carrying Jesus' cross before his crucifixion

Simon of Cyrene (Hebrew: שמעון, Standard Hebrew Šimʿon, Tiberian Hebrew Šimʿôn; Greek: Σίμων Κυρηναῖος, Simōn Kyrēnaios) was the man compelled by the Romans to carry the cross of Jesus of Nazareth as Jesus was taken to his crucifixion, according to all three Synoptic Gospels. He was also the father of the disciples Rufus and Alexander.

== Background ==
Cyrene was a Greek city in the province of Cyrenaica, in eastern Libya. It had a Jewish community, in which 100,000 Judean Jews settled during the reign of Ptolemy Soter (323–285 BC), and was an early center of Christianity.

The Cyrenian Jews had a synagogue in Jerusalem, where many went for annual feasts.

== Biblical accounts ==
Simon's act of carrying the cross, patibulum (crossbeam in Latin), for Jesus is the fifth station of the Stations of the Cross. Some interpret the passage as indicating that Simon was chosen because he may have shown sympathy with Jesus. Others point out that the text itself says nothing, that he had no choice, and that there is no basis to consider the carrying of the cross an act of sympathetic generosity.

And as they came out, they found a man of Cyrene, Simon by name: him they compelled to bear his cross.

— Matthew 27:32, KJV

Mark 15:21 identifies Simon as "the father of Alexander and Rufus". Simon’s role during the Passion is likely historical, as the author of Mark likely knew Alexander and Rufus, and the inclusion of their names may suggest that they were also known to the audience and held some standing in the Christian community at Rome. Mark 15:21 casts Simon's sons as children of an eyewitness who could affirm their father's testimony, stymieing attempts to cast the passion narrative as a literary invention. It has also been suggested that the Rufus (Greek: Ῥοῦφος, Rhouphos) mentioned by Paul in Romans 16:13 is the son of Simon of Cyrene. Some also link Simon himself with the "men of Cyrene" who preached the Gospel to the Hellenized Jews (Greek: Ἑλληνισταί) in Acts 11:20. On the other hand, Simon's name alone does not prove he was Jewish, and Alexander and Rufus were both common names and may have referred to others. Simon is not mentioned in the Gospel of John.

A burial cave in the Kidron Valley discovered in 1941 by E. L. Sukenik, belonging to Cyrenian Jews and dating before AD 70, was found to have an ossuary inscribed twice in Greek "Alexander son of Simon". It cannot, however, be certain that this refers to the same person.

== Gnostic views ==
=== Gnostic ===
According to some Gnostic traditions, Simon of Cyrene, by mistaken identity, suffered the events leading up to the crucifixion. This is the story presented in the Second Treatise of the Great Seth, although it is unclear whether Simon or another actually died on the cross. This is part of a belief held by some Gnostics that Jesus was not of flesh, but only took on the appearance of flesh (see also Basilides, and Swoon hypothesis).

Basilides, in his gospel of Basilides, is reported by Irenaeus as having taught a docetic doctrine of Christ's passion. He states the teaching that Christ, in Jesus, as a wholly divine being, could not suffer bodily pain and did not die on the cross; but that the person crucified was, in fact, Simon of Cyrene. Irenaeus quotes Basiledes:

He appeared on earth as a man and performed miracles. Thus he himself did not suffer. Rather, a certain Simon of Cyrene was compelled to carry his cross for him. It was he who was ignorantly and erroneously crucified, being transfigured by him, so that he might be thought to be Jesus. Moreover, Jesus assumed the form of Simon, and stood by laughing at them.

— Irenaeus, Against Heresies

== In popular culture ==
According to the visions of Anne Catherine Emmerich, Simon was a pagan and was recognized as such by the Roman soldiers from his clothing; as a consequence, they then chose to oblige him in helping Jesus to carry the cross.

Poet Ridgely Torrence wrote a play about him titled Simon the Cyrenian. A 1920 YWCA production of this play was directed by Dora Cole, sister of composer Bob Cole, and starred Paul Robeson.

Sidney Poitier was cast as Simon of Cyrene in The Greatest Story Ever Told that was directed by George Stevens and released in 1965.

The 1979 comedy film Monty Python's Life of Brian includes a vignette alluding to Simon of Cyrenein which a seemingly pious and generous man offers to carry the cross of one of the condemned, "Brother, let me shoulder your burden." Upon doing so, the condemned man runs off, leaving the generous man stuck with the cross and future crucifixion.

The film The Passion of the Christ portrays Simon (Jarreth Merz) as a Jew who, having been forced by the Romans to carry the cross, is initially unwilling but comes to show compassion to Jesus and helps him.

French singer-poet Georges Brassens mentioned Simon in one of the verses of his famous song-poem La prière (The prayer): "Comme la croix du fils sur Simon de Cyrène" (Like the son's cross on Simon of Cyrene). The song is based on an original poem called Rosaire by French poet Francis Jammes that also contains this verse.

== Movements ==
Both the Simon Community, and the Cyrenian movement (which provides services to homeless and other disadvantaged groups in the UK) take their name from Simon of Cyrene.

== See also ==
- Chapel of Simon of Cyrene
- Islamic views on Jesus' death
