= Heinrich Paulus =

German Lutheran theologian (1761–1851)

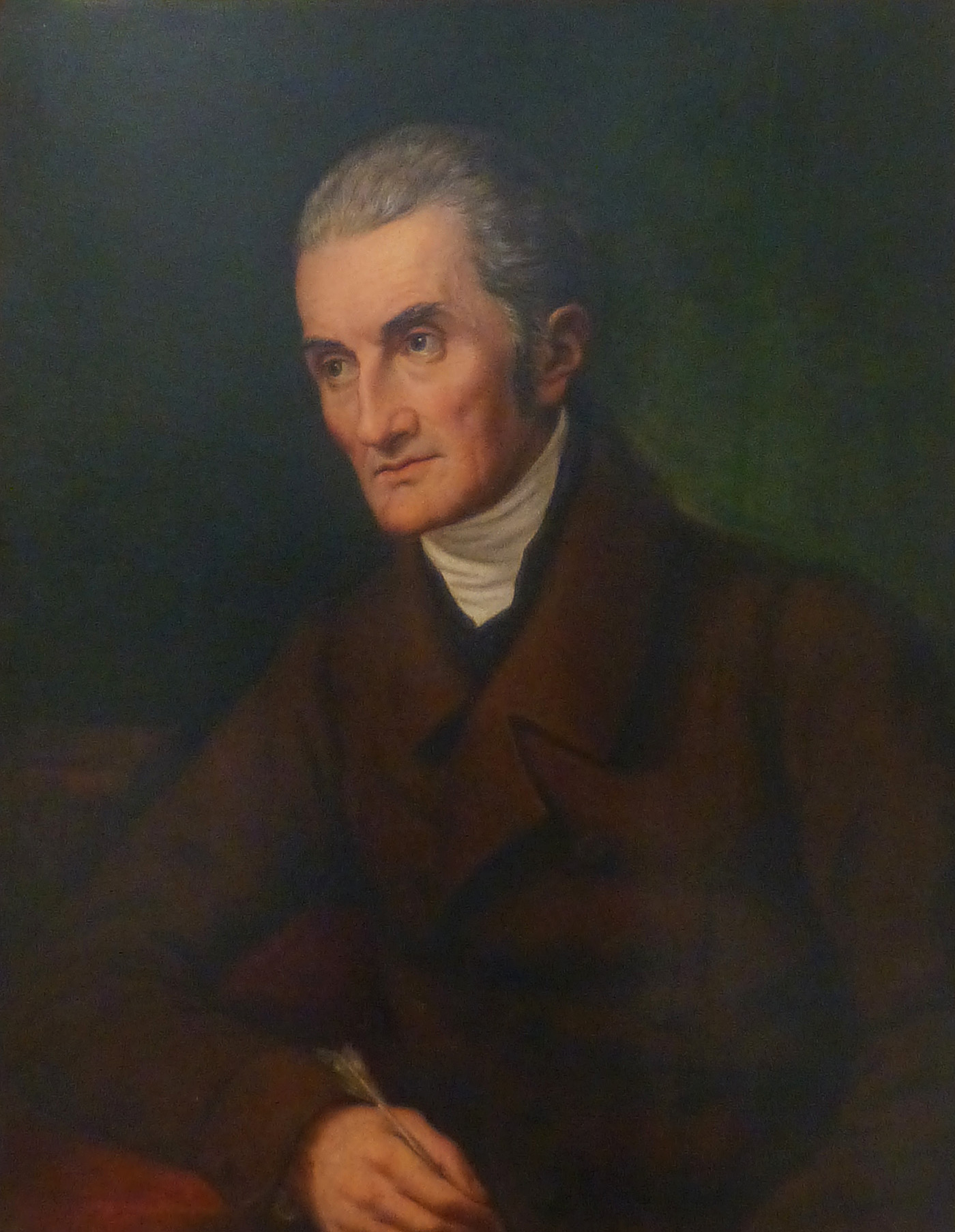
- Born: Heinrich Eberhard Gottlob Paulus; 1 September 1761; Leonberg, Württemberg
- Died: 10 August 1851 (aged 89); Heidelberg, Baden

Academic background
- Education: University of Tübingen (MA in Phil., 1781; MTheol, 1784)
- Academic advisor: Gottlob Christian Storr

Academic work
- Institutions: University of Jena
- Notable students: Ferdinand Hitzig; Karl Krause; Wilhelm Martin Leberecht de Wette
- Main interests: Natural explanations for the biblical miracles

Heinrich Eberhard Gottlob Paulus (1 September 1761 – 10 August 1851) was a German theologian and critic of the Bible. He is known as a rationalist who offered natural explanations for the biblical miracles of Jesus.

== Career ==
Paulus was a professor of theology and oriental languages at the University of Jena (1789–1803), then professor at the University of Würzburg (1803–1807). He spent time in Bamberg, Nürnberg and Ansbach before becoming professor of exegesis and church history at the University of Heidelberg (1811–44), where he was instrumental in hiring Hegel in 1816. His theological rationalism greatly influenced Hegel's own theology.

As a Lutheran in the Age of Enlightenment, he firmly believed in the autonomy of the individual and freedom of the individual (through reason) from the dogma of the church.

His special work was the exposition of the Old and New Testaments in the light of his oriental learning and according to his characteristic principle of "natural explanation". In his explanation of the Gospel narratives, Paulus sought to remove what other interpreters regarded as miracles from the Bible by distinguishing between the fact related and the author's opinion of it, by supplying circumstances omitted by the author, by remembering that the author produces as miracles occurrences which can now be explained otherwise, such as exorcisms. According to Paulus, the miracles can be explained as misunderstandings: something perfectly natural took place, but Jesus' disciples were confused by the circumstances. For example, Paulus' naturalistic exegesis of the narrative of Jesus walking on water is that περιπατῶν ἐπὶ τὴν θάλασσαν (Matthew 14:25) really means by the shore and not on the sea. He contends that since it was a dark stormy night and the disciples had trouble making headway in their boat, when Jesus appeared they only thought they were in the middle of the Sea of Galilee when in truth they were still in the shallows. When Peter reaches out to Jesus he is able to stand in the shallow water until he falls and is easily rescued from the "depths". In another narrative, feeding of the five thousand, Paulus sees another misunderstanding. As Jesus passes the loaves and fish to his disciples the multitude of people realize they are hungry as well and begin preparing their own food. Soon everyone is eating and the extraordinarily communal moment is coated with miraculous qualities when the Evangelists later reminisce on it. Paulus even claims to explain the resurrection of Jesus this way. He is the first scholar to propose the "swoon theory" which speculates that Jesus did not actually die on the cross, but somehow survived his execution and proclaimed that he had risen from the dead. This theory has faced criticism and is now looked upon as Christian apologetics by certain scholars. The rationalism espoused by Paulus went out of fashion during his lifetime and was replaced by David Strauss' view that held that scripture can be best characterized as mythology.

Charges of antisemitism have been levelled at Paulus for his advocacy of assimilation of Jewish people into German culture. In his published pamphlet "The Jewish National Separation: Its Origin, Consequences, and the Means of its Correction." he argued that "Jews were a nation apart, and would remain so as long as they were committed to their religion, whose basic intent and purpose were to preserve them in that condition. In a country that was not their own, therefore, Jews could not claim more than the bare protection of their lives and possessions. They might certainly not claim political equality."

== Published works ==
- 1802, Philologisch-kritischer und historischer Kommentar über das neue Testament (Philological criticism and historical commentary on the New Testament)
- 1828, Das Leben Jesu als Grundlage einer reinen Geschichte des Urchristentums (The life of Jesus as the basis of a purely historical account of early Christianity; 2 vols.)

== See also ==
- Deism
- David Strauss
- Johann Gottlieb Fichte – Paulus was one of Fichte's "staunchest supporters and allies"
- Swoon hypothesis – Scheintod (apparent death) in Paulus' words
- Friedrich Wilhelm Joseph Schelling
- Hermann Samuel Reimarus – another rationalist theologian (1694–1768)
- Karl Friedrich Bahrdt – another rationalist theologian (1741–1792)
