= J. Archibald Douglas =

British academic

James Archibald Douglas (7 March 1866 – 11 October 1930) was a British academic. He was the first professor of English and History at Government College, Agra.

Douglas is mainly remembered for having investigated, and debunked, the claims of Nicolas Notovitch regarding a secret record of Jesus' visit to India being found at the Hemis Monastery. Douglas made his own visit to the monastery in 1895, and published his findings in the journal Nineteenth Century. These findings were then publicized in the New York Times on 19 April.

Douglas was born in Sheffield, the second son of Rev. Robert Douglas (1836-1912), Rector at Odell, Bedfordshire, and Annie Johnson (d. 1922). Art scholar Robert Langton Douglas was his elder brother. He was educated at Merton College, Oxford.

In 1891, he was the tutor and friend of the young Aleister Crowley, introducing him to the "joys of drinking, smoking, card games, and girls".

He died in London in 1930.
