= Hermann Samuel Reimarus =

German philosopher (1694–1768)

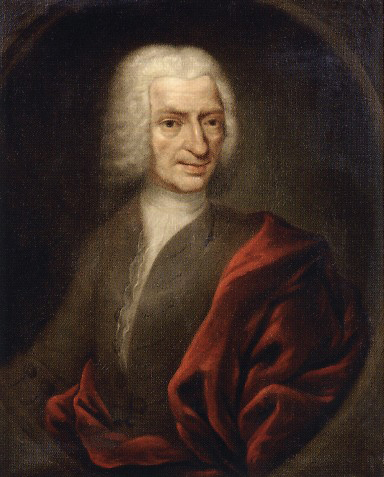
Hermann Samuel Reimarus (1749)

Hermann Samuel Reimarus (22 December 1694, Hamburg – 1 March 1768, Hamburg), was a German philosopher and writer of the Enlightenment who is remembered for his Deism, the doctrine that human reason can arrive at a knowledge of God and ethics from a study of nature and our own internal reality, thus eliminating the need for religions based on revelation. He denied the supernatural origin of Christianity, and was the first influential critic to investigate the historical Jesus. According to Reimarus, Jesus was a mortal Jewish prophet, and the apostles founded Christianity as a religion separate from Jesus’ own ministry.

== Biography ==
Reimarus was educated by his father and by the scholar J. A. Fabricius, whose son-in-law he subsequently became. He attended school at the Gelehrtenschule des Johanneums. He studied theology, ancient languages, and philosophy at the University of Jena, became Privatdozent at the University of Wittenberg in 1716, and in 1720–21 visited the Netherlands and England. In 1723 he became rector of the high school at Wismar, and in 1727 professor of Hebrew and Oriental languages at his native city's high school. Although he was offered more lucrative positions by other schools, he held this post until his death.

His duties were light; and he employed his leisure in the study of philology, mathematics, philosophy, history, political economy, science and natural history, for which he made large collections. His house was the center of the highest culture of Hamburg; and a monument of his influence in that city still remains in the Haus der patriotischen Gesellschaft, where the learned and artistic societies partly founded by him still meet. He had seven children, only three of whom survived him – the distinguished physician Johann Albert Heinrich Reimarus, and two daughters, one of them being Elise Reimarus, Lessing's friend and correspondent. Reimarus died on 1 March 1768.

== Publications ==
Reimarus' reputation as a scholar rests on the valuable edition of Dio Cassius (1750–52) which he prepared from the materials collected by Johann Andreas Fabricius. He published a work on logic (Vernunftlehre als Anweisung zum richtigen Gebrauche der Vernunft, 1756, 5th ed., 1790), and two popular books on the religious questions of the day. The first of these was a collection of essays on the principal truths of natural religion (Abhandlungen von den vornehmsten Wahrheiten der natürlichen Religion, 1755, 7th ed., 1798); the second (Betrachtungen über die Triebe der Thiere, 1760, 4th ed., 1798) dealt with one particular branch of the same subject.

But Reimarus' main contribution to theological science was his analysis of the historical Jesus, Apologie oder Schutzschrift für die vernünftigen Verehrer Gottes ("An apology for, or some words in defense of, reasoning worshippers of God" – read by only a few intimate friends during his lifetime), which he left unpublished. After Reimarus' death, Gotthold Ephraim Lessing published parts of this work as "Fragments by an Anonymous Writer" in his Zur Geschichte und Literatur in 1774–1778, giving rise to what is known as the Fragmentenstreit. This had a deep impact as the beginning of critical research of the historical Jesus.

Reimarus pointed out the differences between what Jesus said and what the apostles said, identifying Jesus as a Jewish preacher. Jesus, according to this view, was an apocalyptic prophet preaching about a worldly kingdom soon to come. This view still has currency within modern scholarship. Reimarus also considered Christianity to be a fabrication.

Reimarus' philosophical position is essentially that of Christian Wolff, but he is best known for his Apologie as excerpted by Lessing in what became known as the Wolfenbüttel Fragmente. The original manuscript is in the Hamburg town library. A copy was made for the university library of Göttingen, 1814, and other copies are known to exist. In addition to the seven fragments published by Lessing, a second portion of the work was issued in 1787 by C. A. E. Schmidt (a pseudonym), under the title Übrige noch ungedruckte Werke des Wolfenbüttelschen Fragmentisten, and a further portion by D. W. Klose in Christian Wilhelm Niedner's Zeitschrift für historische Theologie, 1850-52. The complete work has been published as edited by Gerhard Alexander (2 vols, Frankfurt am Main: Insel, 1972). D. F. Strauss has given an exhaustive analysis of the whole work in his book on Reimarus.

The standpoint of the Apologie is that of pure naturalistic Deism. Miracles and mysteries are denied and natural religion is put forward as the absolute contradiction of revealed religion. The essential truths of the former are the existence of a wise and good Creator and the immortality of the soul. These truths are discoverable by reason, and can constitute the basis of a universal religion. A revealed religion could never obtain universality, as it could never be intelligible and credible to all men. However, the Bible does not present such a revelation. It abounds in error as to matters of fact, contradicts human experience, reason and morals, and is one tissue of folly, deceit, enthusiasm, selfishness and crime. Moreover, it is not a doctrinal compendium, or catechism, which a revelation would have to be.

According to Reimarus, the Old Testament says little of the worship of God, and that little is worthless, while its writers are unacquainted with the second fundamental truth of religion, the immortality of the soul (see sheol). The design of the writers of the New Testament, as well as that of Jesus, was not to teach true rational religion, but to serve their own selfish ambitions, thereby exhibiting an amazing combination of conscious fraud and enthusiasm. However, it is important to remember that Reimarus attacked atheism with equal effect and sincerity.

== Analysis ==
Estimates of Reimarus may be found in the works of B. Pünjer, Otto Pfleiderer and Harald Høffding. Pünjer states the position of Reimarus as follows: "God is the Creator of the world, and His wisdom and goodness are conspicuous in it. Immortality is founded upon the essential nature of man and upon the purpose of God in creation. Religion is conducive to our happiness and alone brings satisfaction. Miracles are at variance with the divine purpose; without miracles there could be no revelation."

Pfleiderer says the errors of Reimarus were that he ignored historical and literary criticism, sources, date, origin, etc., of documents, and the narratives were said to be either purely divine or purely human. He had no conception of an immanent reason.

Høffding also has a brief section on the Apologie, stating its main position as follows:

"Natural religion suffices; a revelation is therefore superfluous. Moreover, such a thing is both physically and morally impossible. God cannot interrupt His own work by miracles; nor can He favour some men above others by revelations which are not granted to all, and with which it is not even possible for all to become acquainted. But of all doctrines that of eternal punishment is most contrary, Reimarus thinks, to true ideas of God; and it was this point which first caused him to stumble."

The work of Reimarus was highly praised by Albert Schweitzer. While calling the views expressed in the Fragments mistaken in some respects and one-sided, Schweitzer describes the essay on "The Aims of Jesus and His Disciples" as not only "one of the greatest events in the history of criticism" but also "a masterpiece of general literature". Lessing's third excerpt in Fragments, "On the Passing of the Israelites Through the Red Sea," is said to be "one of the ablest, wittiest and most acute which has ever been written."

Richard N. Soulen points out that Reimarus "is treated as the initiator of ‘Lives of Jesus Research’ by Schweitzer and accorded special honour by him for recognising that Jesus' thought-world was essentially eschatological, a fact overlooked until the end of the 19th century."

== See also ==
- Karl Friedrich Bahrdt – another rationalist theologian (1741–1792)
- Heinrich Paulus – another rationalist theologian (1761–1851)
