= Vision theory of Jesus' appearances =

Hypothesis concerning Jesus' appearances after crucifixion

The vision theory or vision hypothesis is a term used to cover a range of theories that question the physical resurrection of Jesus, and suggest that sightings of a risen Jesus were epiphanies or internal, subjective visionary experiences, often classified as grief or bereavement visions. It was first formulated by David Friedrich Strauss in the 19th century, and has been proposed in several forms by critical contemporary scholarship, including Helmut Koester, Géza Vermes, and Larry Hurtado, and members of the Jesus Seminar such as Gerd Lüdemann.

Christian apologists and certain scholars and theologians reject the theory, holding the resurrection to be an actual bodily phenomenon.

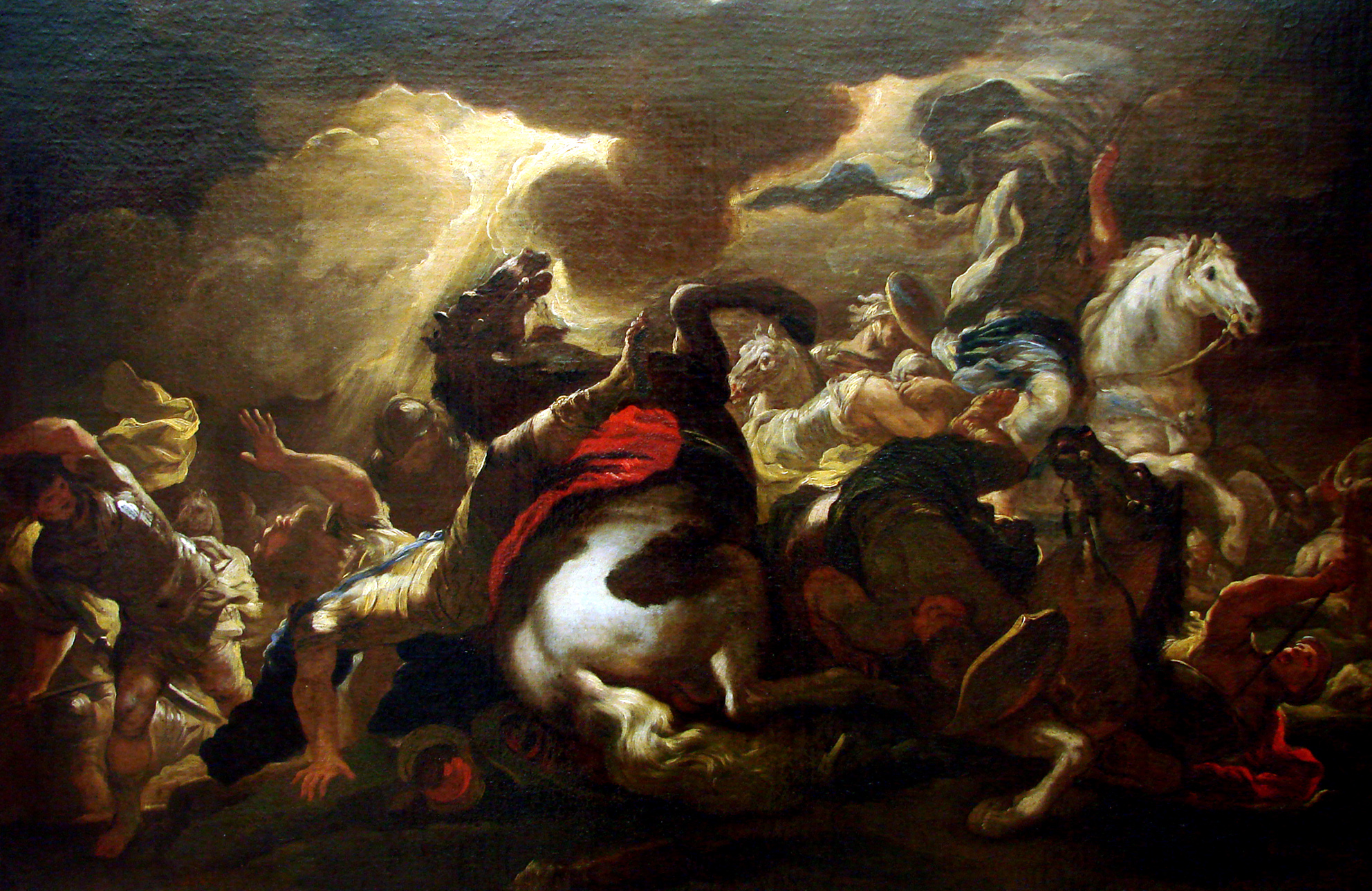
The Conversion of Saint Paul, Luca Giordano, 1690, Museum of Fine Arts of Nancy

== Hypothesis ==
=== Subjective vision theory ===
Origen's response to the second century philosopher Celsus provides the earliest known literary record of a vision hypothesis; it was later popularized by 19th century theologian David Strauss. David Friedrich Strauss (1808–1874), in his Life of Jesus (1835), argued that the resurrection was not an objective historical fact, but a subjective "recollection" of Jesus, transfiguring the dead Jesus into an imaginary, or "mythical," risen Christ. The appearance, or Christophany, of Jesus to Paul and others, was "internal and subjective." Reflection on the Messianic hope, and Psalms 16:10, (Note: See also Herald Gandi (2018), The Resurrection: "According to the Scriptures"?) led to an exaltated state of mind, in which "the risen Christ" was present "in a visionary manner," concluding that Jesus must have escaped the bondage of death. Strauss' thesis was further developed by Ernest Renan (1863) and Albert Réville (1897). These interpretations were later classed the "subjective vision hypothesis", (Note: Gregory W. Dawes (2001), The Historical Jesus Question, page 334: "[Note 168] Pannenberg classes all these attempts together under the heading of "the subjective vision hypothesis."; "[Note 169] In the present study, we have seen this hypothesis exemplified in the work of David Friedrich Strauss.") and is advocated today in secular and Liberal Christian scholarship.

According to Ehrman, "the Christian view of the matter [is] that the visions were bona fide appearances of Jesus to his followers", a view which is "forcefully stated in any number of publications." Ehrman further notes that "Christian apologists sometimes claim that the most sensible historical explanation for these visions is that Jesus really appeared to the disciples."

According to De Conick, the experiences of the risen Christ in the earliest written sources – the "primitive Church" creed of 1 Corinthians 15:3–5, Paul in 1 Corinthians 15:8 and Galatians 1:16 – are ecstatic rapture events.

Paula Fredriksen, an agnostic scholar, expressed strong support for the vision theory, saying that “I know in their own terms what they [the disciples] saw was the raised Jesus. That's what they say, and then all the historic evidence we have afterwards attest to their conviction that that's what they saw. (...) I don't know what they saw. But I do know as a historian that they must have seen something.”

==== Exaltation of Jesus ====
According to Hurtado, the resurrection experiences were religious experiences which "seem to have included visions of (and/or ascents to) God's heaven, in which the glorified Christ was seen in an exalted position." These visions may mostly have appeared during corporate worship. Johan Leman contends that the communal meals provided a context where participants entered a state of mind in which the presence of Jesus was felt; during these meals Jesus’ followers presumably experienced visions of their master or heard his voice. Leman also adheres to cognitive dissonance theory as an alternative explanation for the visions.

According to Ehrman, "the disciples' belief in the resurrection was based on visionary experiences." (Note: Ehrman dismisses the story of the empty tomb; according to Ehrman, "an empty tomb had nothing to do with it [...] an empty tomb would not produce faith.") Ehrman notes that both Jesus and his early followers were apocalyptic Jews, who believed in the bodily resurrection, which would start when the coming of God's Kingdom was near. Ehrman further notes that visions usually have a strong persuasive power, but that the Gospel accounts also record a tradition of doubt about the appearances of Jesus. Ehrman's "tentative suggestion" is that only a few followers had visions, including Peter, Paul, Mary and probably James. They told others about those visions, convincing most of their close associates that Jesus was raised from the dead, but not all of them. Eventually, these stories were retold and embellished, leading to the story that all disciples had seen the risen Jesus. The belief in Jesus' resurrection radically changed their perceptions, concluding from his absence that he must have been transmitted to heaven, by God himself, exalting him to an unprecedented status and authority.

Morton Smith, in his book Jesus the Magician, holds that the apostles learned from their master the ability to induce visions and hallucinations. According to him, shortly after Jesus' demise some of his followers had visionary or mystical experiences where they saw their master risen, leading to the resurrection belief.

==== Call to missionary activity ====
According to Helmut Koester, the stories of the resurrection were originally epiphanies in which the disciples are called to a ministry by the risen Jesus, and at a secondary stage were interpreted as physical proof of the event. He contends that the more detailed accounts of the resurrection are also secondary and do not come from historically trustworthy sources, but instead belong to the genre of the narrative types.

According to Gerd Lüdemann, Peter had a vision of Jesus, induced by his feelings of guilt of betraying Jesus. The vision elevated this feeling of guilt, and Peter experienced it as a real appearance of Jesus, raised from dead. He convinced the other disciples that the resurrection of Jesus signalled that the endtime was near and God's Kingdom was coming, when the dead would rise again, as evidenced by Jesus. This revitalized the disciples, spurring their new mission.

Stephen H. Smith argues that collective delusions and hallucinations can explain the appearances of Jesus just as well as the traditional belief in the Resurrection can. He argues that a more serious interaction with the psychological literature than what came before can help explain and provide comparative material for the sightings of Jesus.

According to Biblical scholar Géza Vermes, some disciples (not necessarily the apostles) had visions or hallucinations of a risen Jesus shortly after his death. The tales of these ‘apparitions’, and potentially the discovery of the empty tomb, encouraged and “illuminated” the dreaded apostles “like a ray of hope”, and eventually induced in them a "powerful mystical or visionary experience". The resurrection is thus to be understood as a “resurrection in the heart”: a reviving of the self-confidence of the followers of Jesus under the influence of the Spirit, "prompting them to resume their apostolic mission." They felt the presence of Jesus in their own actions, "rising again, today and tomorrow, in the hearts of the men who love him and feel he is near.”

=== Objective vision theory ===
Hans Grass (1964) proposed an "objective vision hypothesis," in which Jesus' appearances are "divinely caused visions," showing his followers that his resurrection "was a spiritual reality." Jesus' spirit was resurrected, but his body remained dead, explaining the belated conversion of Jesus' half-brother James. Grass' "objective" vision hypothesis finds no echo in more recent scholarship.

=== Cognitive dissonance reduction ===
A further explanation is provided by the theory of cognitive dissonance, which implies that Jesus’ post-mortem visions might not have been the origin of resurrection belief, but its confirmation in the eyes of the disciples. (Note: Bart Ehrman (June 4, 2016), Were Jesus' Followers Crazy? Was He?) While Jesus' early followers expected the immediate installment of the Kingdom of God, the delay of this cosmic event led to a change in beliefs. According to a naturalistic explanation, in a process of cognitive dissonance reduction, Jewish scriptures were re-interpreted to explain the crucifixion and visionary post-mortem experiences of Jesus. The belief that Jesus' resurrection signaled the imminent coming of the Kingdom of God changed into a belief that the resurrection (i.e. the visions) confirmed the Messianic status of Jesus, and the belief that Jesus would return at some indeterminate time in the future, the Second Coming c.q. Parousia, heralding the expected endtime. The same process may have led to intensive proselytization, convincing others of the developing beliefs to reduce cognitive dissonance, explaining why the early group of followers grew larger despite the failing expectations.

John Gager, one of the first proposers of cognitive dissonance's application to the growth of early Christianity, holds that the visionary experiences (and possibly lucid dreams) of the risen Jesus were the perceived ‘proofs’ that ‘resolved’ the cognitive dissonance itself.

==== Cognitive-dissonance-induced rationalization ====
A more recent variant of the aforementioned theory. Kris Komarnitsky, one the first proposers of this theory, says that while most scholars consider the resurrection belief a consequence of grief or bereavement visions, it is possible that the resurrection belief actually preceded and induced the post-mortem visions of Jesus. According to Komarnitsky, the cognitive dissonance reduction and a staunch refusal to accept Jesus’ death might have originated the resurrection belief, followed by visions (and possibly dreams) of Jesus after his death, which the disciples considered the confirmation of their belief.

=== Interpretation of doubt in the visions ===
According to Bart Ehrman, there is an intrinsic leitmotif of doubt in Jesus’ post-mortem visions, which he called a “doubt tradition”: Mary mistakes the risen Jesus for a gardener, the disciples initially doubt Jesus’ resurrection, and in another episode fail to recognise him until he reaches the shore and talks with them; other examples are episode of doubting Thomas and the disciples of Emmaus, who fail to recognise Jesus till he shares his bread with them.

Most scholars have not delved into the question. Others, such as Morton Smith and Géza Vermes, have simply concluded that, since disciples had ‘visions’ of Jesus, it was normal for them to doubt what they had seen. The elements of doubt eventually remained in the tales.

However, Bart Ehrman notes that this explanation is unlikely, as medical literature suggests that “people who have visions tend to believe them wholeheartedly”. According to Ehrman, there are too many elements of doubt in the tales to consider the aforementioned theory likely. As a result, he offers a “temptation suggestion”: while several of Jesus’ followers were convinced of their master's resurrection by the tales of the disciples who effectively had post-mortem visions, some followers might not have believed them. Over time they either left or “ran away”, and the stories were embellished to make it seem that all the disciples eventually believed in the resurrection visions. Ehrman says the “doubt tradition” may be very old, possibly as old as the visions themselves, which he and various scholars date not further than the first or second year after Jesus’ crucifixion.

Leonard Irwin Eisenberg proposes a variant of the vision theory to explain the “doubt tradition”. Basing his observations on medical literature, he says that some disciples, overwhelmed with grief and pain, might have experienced “mistaken identity” visions: they were deeply convinced to see Jesus, gaze his face or hear his voice, while in reality they were simply seeing or hearing other people. Eisenberg explains therefore several episodes of doubt, such as the apostles and the Emmaus’ disciples not recognising Jesus, or Mary mistaking a gardener for Jesus. He also notes that, in some cases, the characters start to recognise Jesus when the person they are talking to shows kindness toward them or performs a special gesture, such as breaking bread: the kindness of that person would therefore remind them of Jesus’ kindness, inducing the hallucination. According to Eisenberg's theory, over time Jesus’ followers started encouraging each other to see Jesus’ face in other people faces and hear his voice, leading to a self-propagating cycle of Jesus’ sightings.

== Criticism ==
Several Christian apologists such as Gary Habermas, William Lane Craig and Michael Morrison have argued against the vision explanations for the textual accounts of a physical resurrection. According to Schroter and Jacobi, the view that the appearances of Jesus were subjective and the tomb not empty remains a minority in New Testament scholarship, but they also note that "[i]t would also be conceivable that no historical incidents stood at the beginning of the belief in the resurrection, but rather theological ways of thinking." At best, some disciples may have experienced appearances, which were "codetermined by known traditions of heavenly appearances and corresponding expectations" and grew into the Gospel-stories as we know them. According to Habermas, most scholars on Christology are "moderate conservatives", who believe that Jesus was raised from the dead, either physically or spiritually. While the vision theory has gained support among critical scholars since the last quarter of the 20th century, "the vast majority of scholars" still reject the possibility of subjective visions or hallucinations as an explanation for the resurrection-experiences. (Note: Habermas: "In place of the resurrection, both internal states of mind (such as subjective visions or hallucinations) as well as objective phenomena (like illusions) have been proposed. The vast majority of scholars, however, still reject such proposals.") Habermas himself views these critical approaches as "efforts to dismiss the central event and doctrine of orthodox Christianity" and incomplete, given their lack of explanation for the location of Jesus' physical body. He states, "[Jesus's] body would undoubtedly be a rather large disclaimer to the disciples' efforts to preach that Jesus was raised! But hallucinations do not even address this, so another naturalistic thesis is required."

According to British scholar N. T. Wright, visions of the dead were always associated with spirits and ghosts, and never with bodily resurrection. Thus, Wright argues, a mere vision of Jesus would never lead to the unprecedented belief that Jesus was a physically resurrected corpse; at most, he would be perceived as an exalted martyr standing at the right hand of God. Wright argues, "precisely because such encounters [visions of the dead] were reasonably well known [...] they [the disciples] could not possibly, by themselves, have given rise to the belief that Jesus had been raised from the dead [...] Indeed, such visions meant precisely, as people in the ancient and modern worlds have discovered, that the person was dead, not that they were alive." Similarly, Wright calls the cognitive dissonance theory "widely discredited" and criticizes it on the basis that "nobody was expecting anyone, least of all a Messiah, to rise from the dead. A crucified Messiah was a failed Messiah. When Simon bar Kokhba was killed by the Romans in AD 135, nobody went around afterwards saying he really was the Messiah after all."

Dale Allison has expressed similar criticisms, and has argued that visions alone would never lead to the belief in a bodily resurrection. He writes "If there was no reason to believe that his [Jesus's] solid body had returned to life, no one would have thought him, against expectation, resurrected from the dead. Certainly visions of or perceived encounters with a postmortem Jesus would not by themselves, have supplied such reason." He has endorsed David Graieg's work on the Resurrection appearances, which also argues that early Christians remembered Jesus as having physically resurrected.

David Graieg argues that Paul in First Corinthians remembered Jesus as having bodily risen and that the Resurrection was of core importance to early Christians. Using a methodology based on memory theory, Graieg argues that Paul believed in Jesus's bodily resurrection with an uncorrupt new body and considers oral transmission, including the previously neglected "Formal Uncontrolled" method before concluding that an approach based on memory points to the view that Jesus physically rose from the dead and that he was remembered by Christians as having risen in a metamorphized form.

The philosopher Andrew Loke and psychologist Nick Meader do not view psychological theories like hallucinations, delusions, or cognitive dissonance as compelling explanations for the appearances of the risen Jesus. According to their article in Journal for the Study of the Historical Jesus the multimodal and collective nature of the appearances does not lend well to comparisons with other events found in parapsychological literature, and mass hysteria cases and potential instances of cognitive dissonance found are not similar to the situation of the disciples after the Crucifixion.

James D.G. Dunn disputes the view that subjective visions or hallucinations can account for the Resurrection appearances, arguing that a "...self-projected vision would presumably be clothed in the imagery most closely to hand [...] We would then anticipate visions of Jesus in apocalyptic garb, clothed in dazzling white, and/or riding on the clouds of heaven [...] But that is not what we find [...] it is the unexpectedness of the interpretation put upon the resurrection appearances which is so striking, compared with what was currently being envisaged in regard to exalted saints and martyred heroes of the past. Appearances of Jesus which impacted on the witnesses as resurrection appearances did not conform to any known or current paradigm."

While some scholars such as Ehrman have doubted the veracity of the number of witnesses, others such as C.H. Dodd have noted the antiquity of narratives concerning the postmortem appearances of Jesus, citing the sermons in Acts 10 which report that the risen Jesus ate and drank with the disciples which lack influence from Pauline theology or vocabulary and containing a high degree of semitism, lacking resemblance to the rest of Acts and Luke, indicating it comes from a much earlier tradition. Similarly, the Pauline creed preserved in 1 Cor. 15 is most commonly dated to no more than five years after Jesus' death by Biblical scholars and contains numerous postmortem appearances of Jesus. Likewise, in his evaluation of the vision theory, Allison notes that the number of witnesses raises "legitimate questions, and waving the magic wand of 'mass hysteria' will not make them vanish." Maurice Casey admits "we do not have cross-cultural evidence of appearances of recently dead people to as many as 11 bereaved people at once, in such a form that we can reasonably apply them to these eleven". According to the historian A.N. Sherwin-White, “For these stories to be legends, the rate of legendary accumulation would have to be unbelievable; more generations are needed... The span of two generations is too short to allow legendary tendencies to wipe out the hard core of historical fact.”

According to Wright, Paul "believed he had seen the risen Jesus in person, and [...] his understanding of who this Jesus was included the firm belief that he possessed a transformed but still physical body." Similarly, James Ware notes that the verb for "raised" (εγειρω) used by Paul in 1 Cor. 15 is only ever used to describe one or another kind of action involving the raising up, rising up, or setting up of something or someone from a prone or seated position to an upright, standing position. And as paraphrased by Larry Hurtado, that the verb here refers to an ascension of Jesus, a transportation of him in some “spiritual” mode to heavenly glory, is ruled out. (Note: Larry Hurtado (11 September 2014 ), Paul on Jesus’ Resurrection: A New Study)

William Lane Craig holds that the resurrection appearances are far too diverse to be classified as hallucinations; (Note: Craig: "...the diversity of the appearances is not well explained by means of such visions. The appearances were experienced many different times, by different individuals, by groups, at various locales and under various circumstances, and by not only believers, but also by unbelievers like James the brother of Jesus and the Pharisee Saul of Tarsus [...] Even if one could compile from the casebooks an amalgam consisting of stories of hallucinations over a period of time (like the visions in Medjugorje), mass hallucinations (as at Lourdes), hallucinations to various individuals, and so forth, the fact remains that there is no single instance in the casebooks exhibiting the diversity involved in the postmortem appearances of Jesus. It is only by compiling unrelated cases that anything analogous might be constructed.") Craig and Lüdemann entered a written debate on the subject in 2000. German Biblical scholar Martin Hengel notes that Lüdemann's theory transcends the limits of historical research, by providing an analysis which is not verifiable. (Note: Hengel: "Lüdemann [...] does not recognize these limits on the historian. Here he gets into the realm of psychological explanations, for which no verification is really possible [...] the sources are far too limited for such psychologizing analyses.") Craig argues that there is "not a single instance in the casebooks exhibiting the diversity involved in the postmortem appearances of Jesus. While some scholars have posited other mass visions such as those of Mary, mother of Jesus as potential parallels for explaining the appearances, Dale Allison argues that certain events, such as the lights of Our Lady of Zeitoun, defy skeptical explanation and that not all apparitions like the resurrection appearances can automatically be considered subjective, though he does not accept Zeitoun as an actual manifestation of Mary. (Note: Allison: "Zeitoun holds several lessons. One is that some events, including some events of an ostensibly religious nature, resist easy, skeptical dissolution. [...] Given this, we should not, I submit, when studying the resurrection of Jesus, confidently assume, at the outset, that we will be able to squeeze everything into a straight and narrow materialism. Of course, one may, after looking into the problem, decide that one can. The Roman church itself has refused to endorse a slew of Marian apparitions. We should not, however, settle any particular case in advance, in the sure and certain knowledge that today's ideological status quo will explain away everything.") (Note: Allison: "Zeitoun is additionally instructive in that it reveals the importance of one's religious worldview for evaluating a historical event. Eastern Orthodox or Roman Catholic Christians of a certain stripe could make [...] claims about the evidential nature of the apparition at Zeitoun. Multitudes saw the lights. Many said they unmistakably saw Mary the mother of Jesus. Cameras caught the image. The sightings went on for years. dramatic healings took place. When officials hunted for a hoax, they unearthed nothing. And skeptics have as yet no satisfying explanation for the whole series of events. it is clear [...] to apologists for Zeitoun, that Mary revealed herself. [...] I remain unpersuaded. I concede that I cannot debunk the facts, and I confess that I have no satisfactory counter-narrative. Still, I do not believe [...] The cause is not just the seemingly mechanical and repetitive nature of the lights, which strike me as impersonal, but my worldview. I prefer [...] to ascribe the odd phenomena at Zeitoun not to Mary of Galilee but to a something-we-know-not-what.) Mike Licona cites psychologist Dr. Gary Sibcy that visionary explanations for the resurrection lack sufficient scientific support. Psychologist Nick Meader doubts information about bereavement visions are applicable to the Resurrection appearances and argues that illusions or mass psychogenic illness (MPI) are not likely explanations for group appearances of Jesus as narrated by the Gospels. Additionally, Licona and other scholars point out that the vision theory does not account for the conversions of followers such as James, the brother but also disbeliever of Jesus, and of Paul, a persecutor of the early Christians. (Note: Craig: "...the diversity of the appearances is not well explained by means of such visions. The appearances were experienced many different times, by different individuals, by groups, at various locales and under various circumstances, and by not only believers, but also by unbelievers like James the brother of Jesus and the Pharisee Saul of Tarsus [...] Even if one could compile from the casebooks an amalgam consisting of stories of hallucinations over a period of time (like the visions in Medjugorje), mass hallucinations (as at Lourdes), hallucinations to various individuals, and so forth, the fact remains that there is no single instance in the casebooks exhibiting the diversity involved in the postmortem appearances of Jesus. It is only by compiling unrelated cases that anything analogous might be constructed.")

In an early critique of the vision hypothesis, George Park Fisher notes that Jesus' followers had their hopes crushed by his crucifixion, and that this would not have been a "preparation of mind for such a delusion as the hallucination theory implies." He argues further that such a theory is "shut out by one remarkable peculiarity" that "they took place, as Paul's testimony shows, at intervals and in a different number."

== See also ==
- Swoon hypothesis
- Stolen body hypothesis
- Historical Jesus
- Historicity of Jesus

== Sources ==
Printed sources

- Bergeron, Joseph W.; Habermas, Gary R. (2015), "The Resurrection of Jesus: A Clinical Review of Psychiatric Hypotheses for the Biblical Story of Easter" (PDF), Irish Theological Quarterly, 80 (2): 157–172, doi:10.1177/0021140014564555, ISSN 0021-1400
- Bermejo-Rubio, Fernando (2017), "The Process of Jesus' Deification and Cognitive Dissonance Theory", Numen, 64 (2–3): 119–152, doi:10.1163/15685276-12341457
- De Conick, April D. (2006), "What Is Early Christian and Jewish Mysticism?", in De Conick, April D. (ed.), Paradise Now: Essays on Early Jewish and Christian Mysticism, SBL, ISBN 9781589832572
- Ehrman, Bart (2014), How Jesus Became God. The Exaltation of a Jewish Preacher from Galilea, Harperone
- Fredriksen, Paula (2018), When Christians Were Jews: The First Generation, Yale University Press
- Garrett, James Leo (2014). Systematic Theology, Volume 2, Second Edition: Biblical, Historical, and Evangelical, Volume 2. Wipf and Stock Publishers.
- Hurtado, Larry (2005), Lord Jesus Christ. Devotion to Jesus in Earliest Christianity, Eerdmans
- Koester, Helmut (2000), Introduction to the New Testament, Vol. 2: History and Literature of Early Christianity, Walter de Gruyter
- Komarnitsky, Kris (2014), "Cognitive Dissonance and the Resurrection of Jesus", The Fourth R Magazine, 27 (5)
- Kubitza, Heinz-Werner (2016), The Jesus Delusion: How the Christians created their God: The demystification of a world religion through scientific research, Tectum Wissenschaftsverlag
- Leman, Johan (2015), Van totem tot verrezen Heer. Een historisch-antropologisch verhaal, Pelckmans
- Gerd Lüdemann, The Resurrection of Jesus, trans. John Bowden (Minneapolis: Fortress Press, 1994)
- McGrath, Alister E. (2011), Christian Theology: An Introduction, John Wiley & Sons, ISBN 9781444397703
- Vermes, Geza (2008a), The Resurrection, London: Penguin
- Vermes, Geza (2008b), The Resurrection: History and Myth, New York: Doubleday, ISBN 978-0-7394-9969-6

Web-sources
