= Barbara Thiering =

Australian historian, theologian, and biblical exegete (1930-2015)

Barbara Elizabeth Thiering (15 November 1930 – 16 November 2015) was an Australian historian, theologian, and biblical exegete specialising in the origins of the early Christian Church. In books and journal articles, she challenged Christian orthodoxy, espousing the view that new findings present alternative answers to its supernaturalistic beliefs. Her analysis has been often crudely rejected by many but not all theologians, New Testament scholars and scholars in Judaism.

== Background ==
Born in Sydney, Australia, as Barbara Houlsby, she married Barry Thiering in the late 1940s. She graduated in 1952 from the University of Sydney with First Class Honours in Modern Languages, was a high school teacher of languages for several years, and then, while caring for her three young children, continued study and research privately. She obtained an external B.D. degree from the University of London, an M.Th. degree from Melbourne College of Divinity, and a Ph.D. degree from the University of Sydney in 1973.

== Pesher technique ==
Thiering claimed to have discovered, from her specialty study of the pesharim of the Dead Sea Scrolls, their semiotics, and their hermeneutics, a "pesher technique" for decoding the New Testament stories. Whereas Qumran-style pesher of the Dead Sea Scrolls decodes ancient prophetic writings to find contemporary apocalyptic meanings, Thiering's "pesher technique" claims that the gospel writers encoded contemporary facts in miracle stories to be told in the future. She also claims that the early Christian Church was a natural development of "Sons of Light" of the Qumram community. The theory argues that the miracles, including turning water into wine, the virgin birth, healing a man at a distance, the man who had been thirty-eight years at the pool, and the resurrection, among others, did not actually occur (as miracles), as Christians believe, nor were they legends, as some sceptics hold, but were "deliberately constructed myths" concealing (yet, to certain initiates, relating) esoteric historic events. She alleges that they never actually happened (that is, that the events they chronicle were not at all miraculous), as the authors of the Gospels knew. According to her interpretation, the pesher style of interpretation used by the Qumran community was also used by the authors of the Gospels; thus, they wrote on two levels. For the "babes in Christ," there were apparent miracles, but the knowledge of exact meanings held by the highly educated members of Gnostic schools gave a real history of what Jesus actually did.

== Work ==
In view of her research publications in academic journals, she was invited to lecture at Sydney University, at first in the Department of Semitic Studies, then in the School of Divinity (now the Department of Religious Studies), where she continued until her retirement. During this time she was a member of the Board of Studies in Divinity and the Board of Continuing Education, and served for twelve years as a lay member of the New South Wales Equal Opportunity Tribunal. When her work became known in the United States, she was made a fellow of the Jesus Seminar.

In 1990, a documentary film about her research, Riddle of the Dead Sea Scrolls, was shown by the Australian Broadcasting Corporation.

== Academic reception ==
Thiering's thesis attracted some controversy in the media when Jesus the Man was published in 1990, and her ideas have not received acceptance by many of her academic peers. In a response to a letter Thiering wrote to The New York Review of Books objecting to a review by Géza Vermes, Vermes outlined the academic reception of her work, claiming:

"Professor Barbara Thiering's reinterpretation of the New Testament, in which the married, divorced, and remarried Jesus, father of four, becomes the "Wicked Priest" of the Dead Sea Scrolls, has made no impact on learned opinion. Scroll scholars and New Testament experts alike have found the basis of the new theory, Thiering's use of the so-called "pesher technique", without substance."

In 1993, N. T. Wright, New Testament historian and former Bishop of Durham, wrote:

It is safe to say that no serious scholar has given this elaborate and fantastic theory any credence whatsoever. It is nearly ten years since it was published; the scholarly world has been able to take a good look at it: and the results are totally negative.

James F. McGrath, an Associate Professor in the Religion and Philosophy department at Butler University, in his 1996 review of the book, states that Thiering's thesis lacks proof, and that she herself acknowledges that the pesher of the Revelation of St. John is her own composition.

In their widely acclaimed book on the historical Jesus, serious biblical scholars James Crossley and Robert J. Myles write that the Dead Sea Scrolls from Qumran are among the best Jewish sources for reconstructing the life of the historical Jesus "because they were collected, written, and interpreted before and around the time of Jesus." However, "no New Testament documents were among the scrolls, and conspiracy theories about them containing coded references to Jesus cannot be taken seriously".

Edna Ullman-Margalit, a former professor at the Hebrew University of Jerusalem, wrote:

As an example consider the case of Barbara Thiering. She claims that the scrolls are the product of rivalry between the supporters of John the Baptist, identified with the scrolls’ “Teacher of Righteousness,” and Jesus, identified with the “Man of the Lie.” For my purposes this theory must be considered altogether initially outlandish, given the scientifically definitive dating (based mostly on paleographical and on radiocarbon techniques) of the scrolls to a period well before the birth of Christianity (Thiering, 1992). Thiering’s theory, by the way, is a good example of a fringe theory that is popular with the media.

Australian theologian Christopher Walker has written:

Barbara Thiering's identification of two of the main personalities of the Qumran Scrolls - the 'Teacher of Righteousness' and the 'Wicked Priest' with John the Baptist and Jesus respectively - has not convinced any professional working in the field. ... Her extensive use of the pesher technique to reinterpret the whole story of Jesus is equally unsupported by the scholarly community. ...

Despite her claims to the contrary, supporting evidence from the Scrolls is not to be found for most of her hypotheses. Having discovered the pesher technique, she uses it wholeheartedly and without discrimination. ...

As I have briefly indicated, her scholarly peers have found her arguments to be tenuous and unconvincing. Despite her assertions to the contrary, her presentation of Jesus owes far more to fictitious imagination than to historical research.

== Death ==
Barbara Thiering died on 16 November 2015, the day after her 85th birthday.

== Selected bibliography ==
- Jesus the Man: New Interpretation from the Dead Sea Scrolls, re-issued in paperback with foreword by Barbara Thiering (Simon and Schuster, New York; November 2006; ISBN 1-4165-4138-1).
- Jesus of the Apocalypse: The Life of Jesus After the Crucifixion (Transworld Doubleday 1995, ISBN 0-385-40559-6). (Translated into Japanese)
- The Book That Jesus Wrote - John’s Gospel (Transworld Doubleday 1998, ISBN 0-552-14665-X)
- Created Second? Key Aspects of Women's Liberation in Australia (Sydney, Family Life Movement of Australia, 1973, ISBN 9780909922603)

=== Articles ===
- Thiering, Barbara. "Goddess", Women-Church: Australian Journal of Feminist Studies in Religion, no. 9 (1991): 15. Digitised version of no. 9 (1991) available on JSTOR Open Community Collections, University of Divinity Digital Collections, Mannix Library
- Thiering, Barbara. "Looking Back - and Forward", Women-Church: Australian Journal of Feminist Studies in Religion, no. 40 (2007): 15–16. Digitised version of no. 40 (2007) available on JSTOR Open Community Collections, University of Divinity Digital Collections, Mannix Library
