= Karl Friedrich Bahrdt =

Unorthodox German Protestant biblical scholar, theologian, and polemicist

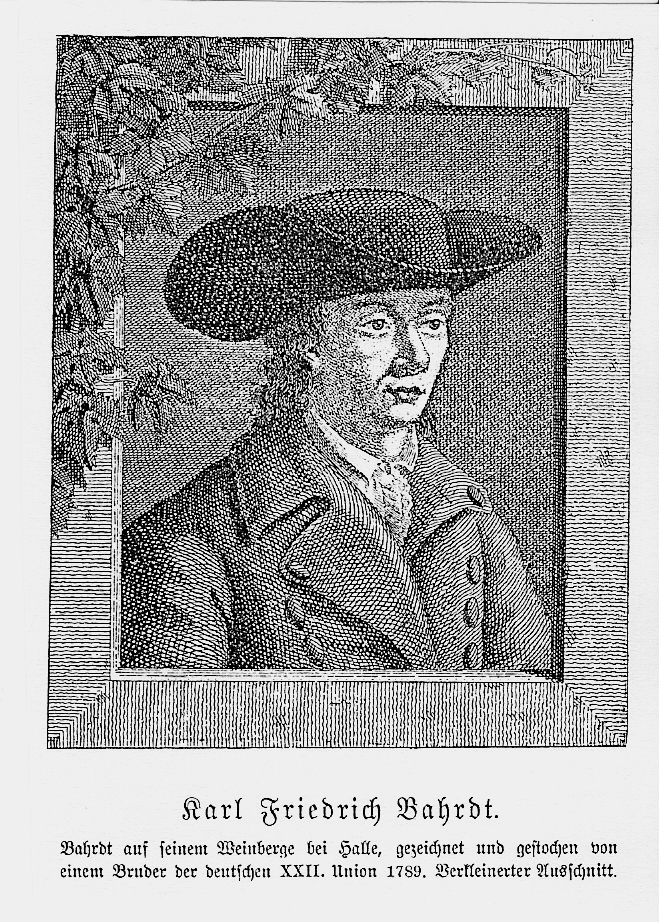
- Karl Friedrich Bahrdt
- Pronunciation: German pronunciation: [kaʁl ˈfʁiːdʁɪç ˈbaːɐ̯t]
- Born: 25 August 1741
- Died: 23 April 1792 (aged 50)
- Occupations: Biblical scholar, theologian, and polemicist

Karl Friedrich Bahrdt (German pronunciation: [kaʁl ˈfʁiːdʁɪç ˈbaːɐ̯t]; 25 August 1741 – 23 April 1792), also spelled Carl Friedrich Bahrdt, was an unorthodox German Protestant biblical scholar, theologian, and polemicist. Controversial during his day, he is sometimes considered an "enfant terrible" and one of the most immoral characters in German learning.

== Life ==
=== Early life and education (1741–1768) ===
Bahrdt was born on 25 August 1741 in Bischofswerda, Upper Lusatia, where his father was pastor of the local church. The elder Bahrdt was later a professor, canon, and general superintendent at Leipzig. He received his early education at the celebrated school of Pforta, but some commenters have found his training to have been grossly neglected.

At sixteen, he enrolled in the University of Leipzig, where he studied under Christian August Crusius, who was then head of the theological faculty. The boy varied the monotony of his studies by pranks which revealed his unbalanced character, including an attempt to raise spirits with the aid of Dr Faust's Höllenzwang.

After graduation, he lectured on biblical exegesis for a time as an adjunct to his father before becoming a catechist (Katechet) at the church of St Peter. He proved an eloquent and popular preacher and returned to the university as a visiting professor (professor extraordinarius) of biblical philology. He published a popular book of devotions, The Christian in Solitude, but was required to resign his positions and leave the Leipzig in 1768 on account of his irregular conduct.

=== Career (1768–1787) ===
Christian Adolph Klotz was then able to secure him the chair in biblical antiquities at the University of Erfurt. As the post was unpaid and Bahrdt was now married, he made his actual living as an inn-keeper and from private tutoring. Once he completed his doctorate of theology at Erlangen, he was able to persuade the faculty at Erfurt to appoint him professor designate of theology and began reading lectures. His orthodoxy had by this time completely vanished: Bahrdt was now an extreme rationalist and determined to popularize the position. He was not dismissed on this account, however, but left Erfurt in 1771 on account of his debts and the personal and professional quarrels he had become embroiled in with his colleagues.

He left for a post as professor of theology and preacher at the University of Giessen. His personal behavior was no less or more objectionable than elsewhere, but his publication of God's Recent Revelations in Letters and Stories (Neueste Offenbarungen Gottes in Briefen und Erzählungen) between 1773 and 1775 made plain his departure from official doctrine. The work—a "model version" of the New Testament in modern German—occasioned a memorably scornful attack on its poor taste by Goethe and prompted Bahrdt to again resign his position and relocate.

He then served as the director of the educational institution (philanthropin) established by Ulysses von Salis-Marschlins at his Château de Marschlins. It had languished since Martin Planta's death in 1772, but Bahrdt disliked the strict discipline maintained by von Salis, resigned in 1777, and prompted the closing of the school.

Bahrdt next served as general superintendent at Dürkheim-on-the-Hardt at the invitation of the count of Leiningen-Dagsburg. He also attempted to establish a new school at Heidesheim. His luckless translation of the Bible followed him, however, and a 1778 decision of the Court Council of the Empire prohibited him from holding any professorial office, lecturing in any capacity, or publishing any work on theology. He again fled from his creditors and was imprisoned for a short period in Dienheim.

In 1779, he took refuge in Halle, now in dire poverty. There, he kept a tavern with a billiard table near the town gate. In spite of senate and theological opposition, he obtained permission from the Prussian minister Karl Abraham von Zedlitz to lecture on subjects other than theology. He would lecture in the morning on moral philosophy and then retire for the afternoon to his public house, which was largely patronized by students. He repudiated his wife and lived with his mistress and their daughters.

Compelled to write to earn additional income, he developed an astounding literary activity, although most of his works are now considered comparatively worthless or even a caricature of Enlightenment rationalism. He directed all his efforts at the development of a "moral system" intended to replace supernatural Christianity.

=== German Union and later life (1787–1789) ===
Having become a Freemason at some point, Bahrdt founded a secret society to that purpose in 1787 called the German Union of the Two and Twenty, from its original number of members. (Note: The society was intended to "diffuse intellectual light", "annihilate superstition", and "perfect the human race". It was divided into six degrees: The Adolescent, The Man, The Old Man, The Mesopolite, The Diocesan, and The Superior. The latter three grades selected the rules of the society.) To make time for more writing, he gave up his lectures, although he opened a new inn at Weinberg near Halle.

In 1789, he was arrested partly on account of a pasquinade he had written concerning a religious edict passed by Prussia the year before, owing to the religious reaction that set in upon the death of Frederick the Great. The king reduced the term to one year, which Bahrdt devoted to writing his autobiography, "a mixture of lies, hypocrisy, and self-prostitution", along with indecent stories and coarse polemics. The German Union was dissolved upon his arrest and publicly exposed by Johann Joachim Christoph Bode's More Notes than Text (Mehr Noten als Text). Most of its members went on to join the Illuminati.

=== Death ===
Bahrdt died of a severe illness in Nietleben near Halle on 23 April 1792.

== Works ==
- Books by Karl Friedrich Bahrdt at Open Library
- Karl Friedrich Bahrdt in the German National Library catalogue
- Bahrdt, Karl Friedrich (2003), "On Freedom of the Press and its Limits", in Laursen, John Christen (ed.), Early French and German Defenses of Freedom of the Press, Brill's Studies in Intellectual History, No. 113, Brill, ISBN 978-90-04-13017-3

== See also ==
- Heinrich Paulus – another rationalist theologian (1761–1851)
- Hermann Samuel Reimarus – another rationalist theologian (1694–1768)
