= Jesus in Indien =

1985 book by Günter Grönbold

Jesus in Indien. Das Ende einer Legende
- Author: Günter Grönbold
- Genre: Historiography
- Publisher: Kösel-Verlag
- Publication date: 1985
- Pages: 152 (including index)
- ISBN: 3-466-20270-1

Jesus in Indien. Das Ende einer Legende is a 1985 book by the German indologist Günter Grönbold investigating the Islamic, Christian and Buddhist source material used by the Ahmaddiya Muslim founder Ghulam Ahmad in his book Jesus in India. The book is Grönbold's best known book among the general public in Germany, and is the most cited scholarly text about the sources of Ahmad's interpretation and the Roza Bal shrine among subsequent academic and popular writing. Following consideration of the original context and history of the literary sources cited by Ahmad and later Ahmaddiya supporters of the theory that Jesus of Nazareth survived the crucifixion and made a journey to India and was buried in Srinagar Kashmir, Grönbold concludes that Ahmad misidentified material about the putative Christian saint "Yuzafa" from the Barlaam and Josaphat traditions telling a Christianized version of the life of Siddhartha Gautama, as being material concerning Jesus of Nazareth. Grönbold's work was revisited, cited and developed by Norbert Klatt (1988) and Mark Bothe (2009, 2013). Bothe regarded Grönbold as the first and only scholar in the area to have developed a history of the origination of the various "Jesus in India" legends.
