= Frederick Zugibe =

American medical examiner (1928–2013)

- Born: Frederick Thomas Zugibe; May 28, 1928; Garnerville, New York
- Died: September 6, 2013 (aged 85)
- Education: St. Francis College (BS); Columbia University (MS); University of Chicago (PhD); West Virginia University (MD)
- Known for: Studying the Crucifixion of Jesus and the Shroud of Turin
- Scientific career
- Thesis: The composition of extracellular substanes in human arteries and changes with aging. (1960)

Frederick Thomas Zugibe (/ˈzʌɡɪbi/; May 28, 1928 – September 6, 2013) was the chief medical examiner of Rockland County, New York from 1969 to 2002. Zugibe was known for his research and books on forensic medicine as well as his crucifixion and Shroud of Turin studies.

== Life ==
Zugibe was born in Garnerville, New York on May 28, 1928. He graduated from Haverstraw High School in 1946 and obtained a Bachelor of Science from St. Francis College. Zugibe earned a Master of Science degree (Anatomy/Electron Microscopy) from Columbia University, and a PhD in Anatomy and Histochemistry from the University of Chicago. His thesis was on the human artery.

In 1968, Zugibe received a Doctor of Medicine degree (M.D.) from West Virginia University He was a diplomate of the American Board of Pathology in anatomic pathology and forensic pathology, and a diplomate of the American Board of Family Practice. Zugibe was an adjunct associate professor of pathology at Columbia University College of Physicians and Surgeons and a Fellow of the College of American Pathologists, a Fellow of the American Academy of Forensic Sciences, Forensic Pathology Section, and a member of the National Association of Medical Examiners.

He was formerly Director of Cardiovascular Research with the Veteran's Hospital in Pittsburgh. Well known in the field of cardiovascular research, Zugibe was a Fellow of the American College of Cardiology, Fellow of the Council on Arteriosclerosis of the American Heart Association, Fellow of the New York Cardiological Society, and Member of the International Atherosclerosis Society.

Zugibe spent most of his career as the chief medical examiner of Rockland County, New York, appointed on August 15, 1969, to his retirement on December 31, 2002, and continuing as Acting Medical Examiner to March 31, 2003, until his successor was confirmed. On his retirement he estimated his office had done 10,000 autopsies during his tenure.

Zugibe is well known for his research into crucifixion and the Shroud of Turin, which modifies the theories of Pierre Barbet regarding crucifixion, and the Catholic Church regarding the Shroud of Turin. He made numerous television appearances on these subjects, including How Jesus Died - the Final 18 Hours (Learning Channel and History Channel), The Shroud of Turin (CBC), Jesus, the Man (Discovery Channel), Son of God (BBC), Stigmata and the Shroud (In Search of...), The Stigmata (Learning Channel), The Shroud of Turin (60 Minutes, Australia), DaVinci and the Shroud (National Geographic), The Mystery of Jesus (CNN) and The Naked Archaeologist.

Zugibe was one of the people investigating the Eucharistic miracle of Buenos Aires.

In 2003 Rockland County dedicated the Rockland County Medical Examiner's Office as the Dr. Frederick T. Zugibe Forensic Unit. A new disease, Glycoprotein Storage Disease, first described in the American Journal of Medicine by Zugibe and co-author Dr. Enid Gilbert, has been named the Zugibe-Gilbert Syndrome.

Frederick Zugibe died on Friday, September 6, 2013, at the age of 85.

== Publications ==
=== Books ===
- Zugibe, Frederick; Carroll, David L. (2005). Dissecting Death: Secrets of a Medical Examiner. New York: Broadway. ISBN 9780767918794.
- Zugibe, Frederick T (2005). The Crucifixion of Jesus: A Forensic Inquiry (Second ed.). New York: M. Evans & Company. ISBN 9781590770702.
- Zugibe, Frederick T. (1988). The Cross and the Shroud: A Medical Inquiry into the Crucifixion. New York: Paragon House. ISBN 9780913729465.
- Zugibe, Frederick T. (1986). 14 Days to a Healthy Heart. Macmillan. ISBN 9780026336109.
- Zugibe, Frederick T. (1970). Diagnostic Histochemistry. Saint Louis, Mo, USA: Mosby. ISBN 9780801657023.

=== Articles ===
- Zugibe, Frederick T. (January 1963). "Mucopolysaccharides of the arterial wall". Journal of Histochemistry & Cytochemistry. 11 (1): 35–39. doi:10.1177/11.1.35.
- Zugibe, Frederick T.; Gilbert, Enid F.; Gaziano, Dominic (July 1969). "Glycoprotein storage disease". The American Journal of Medicine. 47 (1): 135–140. doi:10.1016/0002-9343(69)90247-2.
- Zugibe, F.T.; Costello, J.T. (1 April 1986). "Identification of the murder weapon by intricate patterned injury measurements". Journal of Forensic Sciences. 31 (2): 773–777. doi:10.1520/JFS12314J.
