= Andreas Faber-Kaiser =

Spanish writer

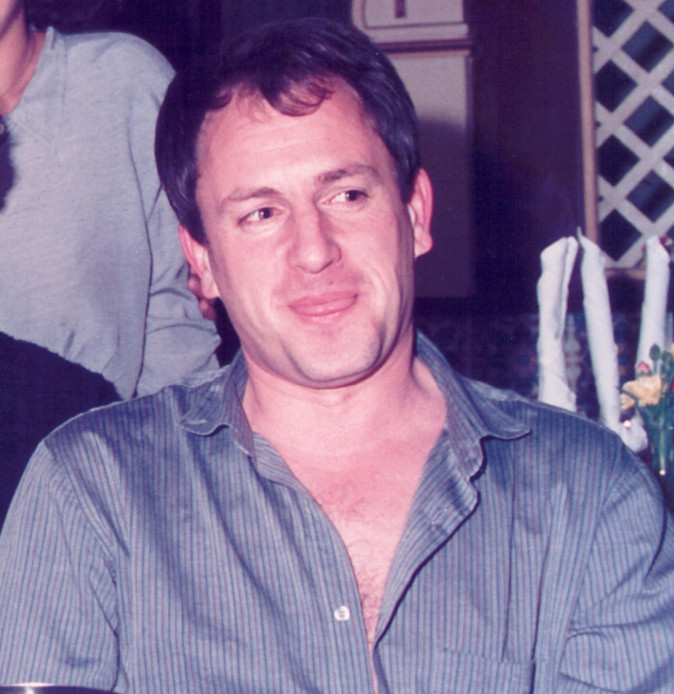
Andreas Faber-Kaiser in 1990

Andreas Faber-Kaiser (5 April 1944 – 14 March 1994) was a Spanish writer. He was editor of the UFO and occult magazine Mundo Desconocido.

== Jesus Died in Kashmir ==
Faber-Kaiser authored Jesus Died in Kashmir in 1977. He was a proponent of the gnostic view that Jesus survived his crucifixion, was hidden by Essenes and travelled to India. Fabier-Kaiser cited discredited apocrypha forgeries such as William Dennes Mahan's A Correct Transcript of Pilate's Court.

== Publications ==
- ¿Sacerdotes o cosmonautas? (1971)
- Cosmos-Cronología general de la Astronáutica (1972)
- Grandes enigmas del Cielo y de la Tierra (1973)
- Hacia la Conquista del Universo (1974)
- Jesús Vivió y murió en Cachemira (1976) (translated as Jesus Died in Kashmir, 1977)
- OVNIs: el archivo de la CIA - Documentación y memorandos (1980)
- OVNIs: el archivo de la CIA - Informes de avistamientos (1980)
- OVNIs: archivos americanos - Documentos militares y de inteligencia (1980)
- La caverna de los tesoros (1984)
- Las nubes del engaño [Crónica extrahumana antigua] (1984)
- Fuera de control [Crónica extrahumana moderna] (1984)
- Sobre el secreto [La isla mágica de Pohnpei y el secreto de Nan Matol] (1985)
- Pacto de silencio (1988)
- El muñeco humano (1989)
