= Gospel of Basilides =

Lost text circulated among the followers of Basilides

The Gospel of Basilides is the title given to a reputed text within the New Testament apocrypha, which is reported in the middle of the 3rd century as then circulating amongst the followers of Basilides (Βασιλείδης), a leading theologian of Gnostic tendencies, who had taught in Alexandria in the second quarter of the 2nd century. Basilides's teachings were condemned as heretical by Irenaeus of Lyons (c. 130 – c. 200) and by Hippolytus of Rome (c. 170 – c. 236), although they had been evaluated more positively by Clement of Alexandria (c. 150 – c. 215). There is, however, no agreement amongst Irenaeus, Hippolytus or Clement as to Basilides's specific theological opinions; while none of the three report a gospel in the name of Basilides.

== History ==
The first direct reference to a Gospel of Basilides is that found in Origen (c. 185 – c. 254), who reports:

The Church has four Gospels. Heretics have many. One of them is entitled According to the Egyptians. Another is According to the Twelve Apostles. Basilides too dared to write a Gospel According to Basilides.

Origen's notice is the source for references to the Gospel of Basilides in Jerome, Ambrose, Philip of Side, and the Venerable Bede. But none of these authors report any quotations from the supposed gospel, nor are they able to give an indication as to its content or character.

Much more is known about Basilides major work in twenty-four books; for which Clement of Alexandria records the title Exegetica (or 'Treatises') and provides quotations from book twenty-three, while other quotations are preserved in the works of Hegemonius. Eusebius of Caesarea reports Agrippa Castor (mid-2nd century) as describing the Exegetica as "twenty-four books on the Gospel", and this notice has been interpreted as characterising the full Exegetica as an extended commentary, whose base text might be inferred as being the lost Gospel of Basilides. From this assumption and the surviving quotations from the Exegetica, a range of theories have been developed as to the nature of the Gospel of Basilides: that it was a redaction of the Gospel of Luke; that it combined the Gospels of Luke and Matthew; that it was a diatessaron, or harmony of all four gospels; that it was an independent account of the life of Jesus; and even that it was an abstract treatise or homily on the religious significance of Jesus, with no specific relation to his teachings or the events of his earthly ministry, similar in this respect to the Gospel of Truth, another Gnostic work. Some scholars maintain that Origen's notice of a Gospel of Basilides was referring to the Exegetica itself; and that the two titles are therefore to be identified. Otherwise, the Gospel of Basilides could denote a 2nd or 3rd century Gnostic text (whether lost or surviving under another title) with no connection to Basilides himself, other than being preserved within the sect that bore his name. Wilhelm Schneemelcher states that "In short it must be said that all conjectures concerning the Gospel of Basilides remain uncertain."

== Account of the Crucifixion ==
Basilides is reported as having taught a docetic doctrine of Christ's passion and a complex theology between angels and a supreme god in the lowest heaven. Although Irenaeus makes no mention of Basilides having written a gospel, he does record him as teaching that Christ in Jesus, as a wholly divine being, could not suffer bodily pain and did not die on the cross; but that the person crucified was, in fact, Simon of Cyrene.

Those angels who occupy the lowest heaven, that, namely, which is visible to us, formed all the things which are in the world, and made allotments among themselves of the earth and of those nations which are upon it. The chief of them is he who is thought to be the God of the Jews; and inasmuch as he desired to render the other nations subject to his own people, that is, the Jews, all the other princes resisted and opposed him. Wherefore all other nations were at enmity with his nation. But the father without birth and without name, perceiving that they would be destroyed, sent his own first-begotten Nous (he it is who is called Christ) to bestow deliverance on those who believe in him, from the power of those who made the world. He appeared, then, on earth as a man, to the nations of these powers, and wrought miracles. Wherefore he did not himself suffer death, but Simon, a certain man of Cyrene, being compelled, bore the cross in his stead; so that this latter being transfigured by him, that he might be thought to be Jesus, was crucified, through ignorance and error, while Jesus himself received the form of Simon, and, standing by, laughed at them. For since he was an incorporeal power, and the Nous (mind) of the unborn father, he transfigured himself as he pleased, and thus ascended to him who had sent him, deriding them, inasmuch as he could not be laid hold of, and was invisible to all. Those, then, who know these things have been freed from the principalities who formed the world; so that it is not incumbent on us to confess him who was crucified, but him who came in the form of a man, and was thought to be crucified, and was called Jesus, and was sent by the father, that by this dispensation he might destroy the works of the makers of the world.

— Irenaeus, Against Heresies I.24.4

Epiphanius of Salamis reports the same episode as being taught by Basilides, although he may in this be relying solely on Irenaeus. Accounts of the living Christ being seen laughing alongside, or above, the crucifixion are also found in two second/third century Gnostic texts in the Nag Hammadi Library; the Apocalypse of Peter and the Second Treatise of the Great Seth; and in the latter text, Simon of Cyrene is also identified as being one of a succession of bodily substitutes for the spiritual Christ. Winrich Löhr infers that a common mid-2nd century gospel tradition (which he nevertheless doubts as originating with Basilides himself) must underlie both the Irenaeus notice and the two Nag Hammadi texts.

== Bibliography ==
- Cross, F. L. & Livingstone, E. A., eds. (1997). article "Basilides". The Oxford Dictionary of the Christian Church. Oxford University Press. ISBN 019211655X.
- Kelhoffer, James A. (2014). Conceptions of "Gospel" and Legitimacy in Early Christianity. Mohr Siebeck. ISBN 9783161526367
- Löhr, Winrich A. (1995). Basilides und seine Schule. Mohr Siebeck. ISBN 9783161463006
- Schneemelcher, Wilhelm (1991). New Testament Apocrypha; English translation by R. McL. Wilson. James Clarke. ISBN 0227679156.
