= Denial of the virgin birth of Jesus =

Rejection of the belief that Jesus was conceived by the Holy Spirit

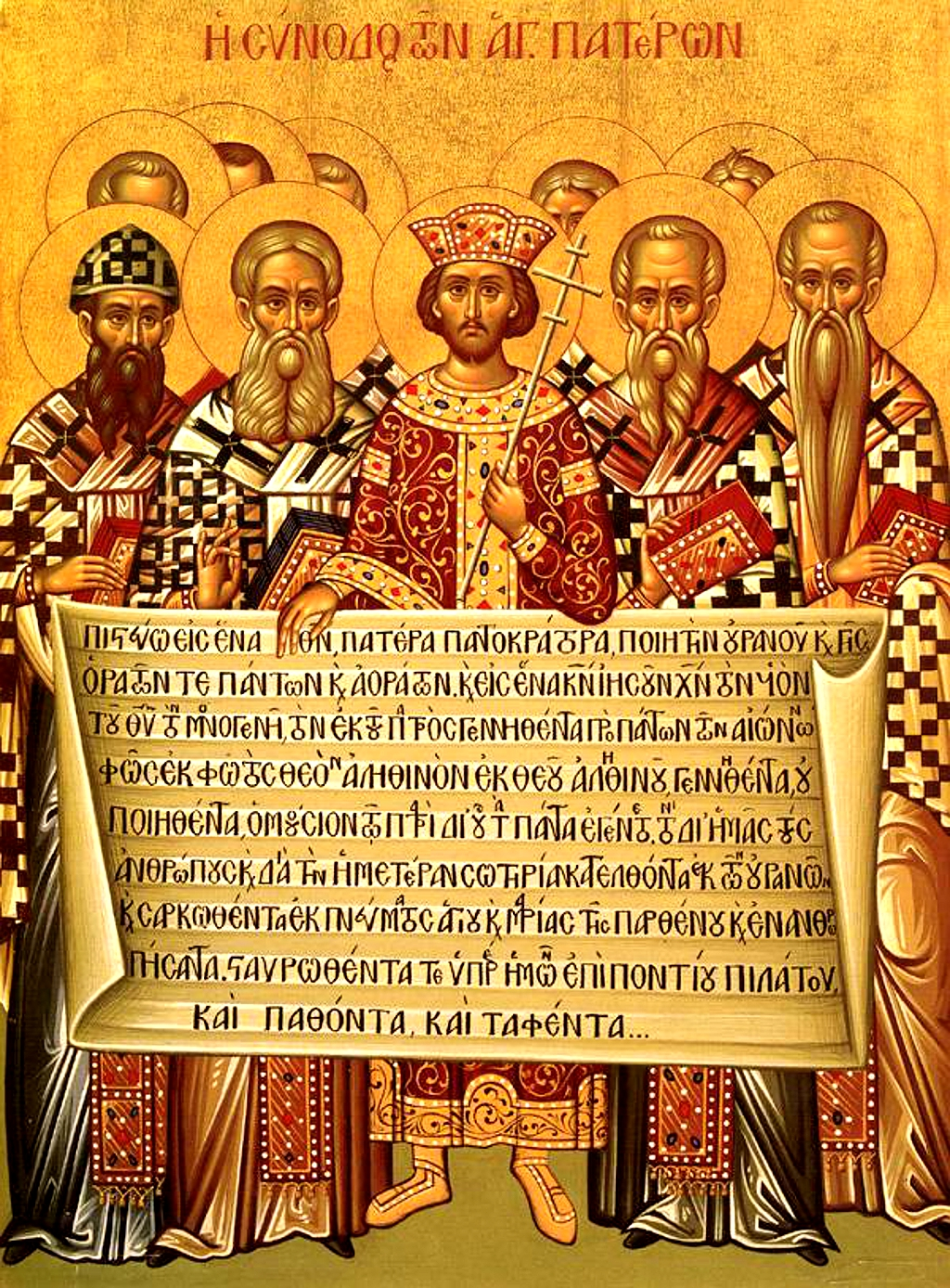
The Nicene Creed, held by Emperor Constantine (center) in this icon, specifically rejected that Jesus had a human father.

Denial of the virgin birth of Jesus is found among various groups and individuals throughout the history of Christianity. These groups and individuals often took an approach to Christology that understands Jesus to be human, the literal son of human parents.

In the 19th century, the view was sometimes called psilanthropism, a term that derives from the combination of the Greek ψιλός (psilós), "plain", "mere" or "bare", and ἄνθρωπος (ánthrōpos) "human". Psilanthropists then generally denied both the virgin birth of Jesus and his divinity. Denial of the virgin birth is distinct from adoptionism and may or may not be present in beliefs described as adoptionist.

== Early Christianity ==
The group most closely associated with denial of the virgin birth were the Ebionites. However, Jerome does not say that all Ebionites denied the virgin birth, but only contrasts their view with the acceptance of the doctrine on the part of a related group, the Nazarenes.

The view was rejected by the ecumenical councils, especially in the First Council of Nicaea, which was convened to deal directly with the nature of Christ's divinity.

== Pagan and Jewish accounts ==
In the 2nd century, the Greek philosopher Celsus claimed that Jesus was the illegitimate son of a soldier named Panthera. The same claim is made by the medieval Jewish text Toledot Yeshu.

== Reformation ==
The turmoil of the Reformation gave rise to many radical groups and individuals, some of whom were accused of denying, or actually did deny, the virgin birth. For example, during the trial of Lorenzo Tizzano before the Inquisition at Venice in 1550, it was charged that the circle of the late Juan de Valdés (died 1541) at Naples had included such individuals. Early Unitarians, often called Socinians, after Laelio Sozzini who first published the first unitarian analysis of John's Logos in 1550, were sometimes accused of denying the virgin birth, but mainly only denied the pre-existence of Christ in heaven. For Sozzini's better known nephew Fausto Sozzini the miraculous virgin birth was the element in their belief which removed the need for the pre-existence to which they objected. The Socinians in fact excommunicated from their number the translator of the first Bible in Belarusian, Symon Budny, for his denial of the virgin birth.

A large scale change among Unitarians to acceptance of a human father for Jesus took place only in the time of Joseph Priestley. The young Samuel Taylor Coleridge was an example of what he called "a psilanthropist, one of those who believe our Lord to have been the real son of Joseph" but later in life Coleridge decisively rejected this idea and accepted traditional Christian belief in the virgin birth.

== 19th–21st centuries ==
Biblical scholars, churchmen, and theologians who have notably rejected the virgin birth include:

- Albrecht Ritschl, nineteenth-century German Lutheran theologian, considered one of the fathers of Liberal Protestantism.
- Harry Emerson Fosdick, American Baptist pastor, prominent proponent of Liberal Protestantism. In a famous 1922 sermon delivered from the pulpit of First Presbyterian Church in New York, titled "Shall the Fundamentalists Win?", Fosdick called the Virgin Birth into question, saying it required belief in "a special biological miracle".
- Fritz Barth, Swiss Reformed minister, and father of Karl Barth. Fritz's views cost him at least two significant promotions.
- James A. Pike, Episcopal bishop of California (1958–1966), who first declared his doubt about the Virgin Birth in the December 21, 1960 issue of the journal Christian Century.
- Martin Luther King's private writings show that he rejected biblical literalism; he described the Bible as "mythological", doubted that Jesus was born of a virgin and did not believe that the story of Jonah and the whale was true.
- John Shelby Spong, retired Episcopal bishop of Newark, author of Born of a Woman: A Bishop Rethinks the Birth of Jesus, who following feminist scholar Jane Schaberg, wrote that, "A God who can be seen in the limp form of a convicted criminal dying alone on a cross on Calvary can surely also be seen in an illegitimate baby boy born through the aggressive and selfish act of a man sexually violating a teenage girl."
- Marcus J. Borg, prominent member of the Jesus Seminar, author of numerous books, and co-author of The Meaning of Jesus: Two Visions, who viewed the birth stories as "metaphorical narratives", and stated, "I do not think the virginal conception is historical, and I do not think there was a special star or wise men or shepherds or birth in a stable in Bethlehem. Thus I do not see these stories as historical reports but as literary creations."
- John Dominic Crossan, prominent member of the Jesus Seminar, author of Jesus: A Revolutionary Biography, who has stated, "I understand the virginal conception of Jesus to be a confessional statement about Jesus' status and not a biological statement about Mary's body. It is later faith in Jesus as an adult retrojected mythologically onto Jesus as an infant."
- Robert Funk, founder of the Jesus Seminar, and author of Honest to Jesus, who has asserted, "We can be certain that Mary did not conceive Jesus without the assistance of human sperm. It is unclear whether Joseph or some other unnamed male was the biological father of Jesus. It is possible that Jesus was illegitimate."
- Jane Schaberg, feminist biblical scholar and author of The Illegitimacy of Jesus, who contended that Matthew and Luke were aware that Jesus had been conceived illegitimately, probably as a result of rape, and had left hints of that knowledge, even though their main purpose was to explore the theological significance of Jesus' birth.
- Uta Ranke-Heinemann, who contends that the virgin birth of Jesus was meant—and should be understood—as an allegory of a special initiative of God, comparable to God's creation of Adam, and in line with legends and allegories of antiquity.
- David Jenkins, Bishop of Durham from 1984 until 1994, was the first senior Anglican clergyman to come to the attention of the UK media for his position that "I wouldn't put it past God to arrange a virgin birth if he wanted. But I don't think he did."
- Gerd Lüdemann, German New Testament scholar and historian, member of the Jesus Seminar, and author of Virgin Birth? The Real Story of Mary and Her Son Jesus, argued that early Christians had developed the idea of a virgin birth as a later "reaction to the report, meant as a slander but historically correct, that Jesus was conceived or born outside wedlock. ... It has a historical foundation in the fact that Jesus really did have another father than Joseph and was in fact fathered before Mary's marriage, presumably through rape."
- Robin Meyers, United Church of Christ minister, proponent of Progressive Christianity, and author of Saving Jesus From the Church: How to Stop Worshiping Christ and Start Following Jesus. Asserts that "A beautiful, but obviously contrived, tale is the virgin birth, which may have been used to cover a scandal."

=== Sects and denominations ===
The Divine Principle, the textbook of the Unification Church, a new religious movement founded in South Korea, does not include the teaching that Zechariah was the father of Jesus. However some of its members hold that belief. Notably, this view is advanced by Young Oon Kim, citing the work of British liberal theologian Leslie Weatherhead in her book Unification Theology (1980).

The Church of Jesus Christ of Latter Day Saints (Strangite), founded by James Jesse Strang, rejects the virgin birth and believes that Jesus' father was Joseph, husband of Mary.

== See also ==
- Virgin birth of Jesus
- Arianism
- King Jesus (novel) (semi-historical novel)
- Adam God doctrine (while not necessarily denying the Virgin Birth per-se, implies sexual relations between God the Father and Mary)
