= R. Joseph Hoffmann =

Christianity historian, author, and lecturer

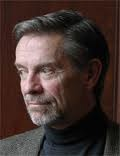
- Born: December 16, 1957 (age 68)
- Occupations: Historian, Author, Lecturer

Raymond Joseph Hoffmann (born December 16, 1957) is a historian whose work has focused on the early social and intellectual development of Christianity. His work includes an extensive study of the role and dating of Marcion in the history of the New Testament, as well the reconstruction and translation of the writings of early pagan opponents of Christianity: Celsus, Porphyry and Julian the Apostate. As a senior vice president for the Center for Inquiry, he chaired the Committee for the Scientific Examination of Religion, CSER, where he initiated the Jesus Project, a scholarly investigation into the historicity of Jesus. Hoffmann has described himself as "a religious skeptic with a soft spot for religion".

== Background ==
Hoffmann holds graduate degrees in theology from Harvard Divinity School and a PhD in Christian Origins from the University of Oxford. He began his teaching career at the University of Michigan as assistant professor of Near Eastern Studies, where he developed the undergraduate and graduate program in Christian origins. From 1991 to 1999, he was senior lecturer in New Testament and Church History at Westminster College, Oxford.

Hoffmann's academic positions include tutor in Greek at Keble College (1980–1983) and senior scholar at St Cross College, Oxford. He was the Wissenschaftlicher Assistant in Patristics and Classical Studies at the University of Heidelberg, the Campbell Professor of Religion and Human Values at Wells College until 2006 and Distinguished Scholar at Goddard College in 2009. He has taught at Cal State Sacramento, the American University of Beirut and various universities in Africa (Malawi, Zimbabwe, and Botswana), the Middle East, the Pacific (Australia and Papua New Guinea) and South Asia, most recently as visiting professor of history at LUMS in Lahore, Pakistan and as Professor of Historical Linguistics at the Graduate University of the Chinese Academy of Sciences in Beijing. Hoffmann has also served as special lecturer in Liberal Arts at the New England Conservatory in Boston.

As a fellow at the Center for Inquiry, he was chair of the Committee for the Scientific Examination of Religion from 2003 to 2009, and a founding faculty member (1986) of the Humanist Institute. Until 2016 he served on the faculty of Liberal Arts at the American University of Central Asia. With Yasir Fazaa, he founded the Westminster School in Port Sudan while serving as deputy general manager for academic affairs (2013; 2016) of Cambridge International.

== Scholarly work ==
=== Marcion ===
Hoffmann's 1982 doctoral thesis, Marcion: On the Restitution of Christianity, was published in 1984. Hoffmann proposed that Marcion must be dated substantially before the dates assigned on the basis of patristic testimony. According to Hoffmann, Marcion possessed the earliest version of Luke and preserved the primitive version of Paul's letters. He also attempted to discredit much of the early patristic evidence for Marcion's life and thought as being apologetically driven.

Reviews of this work reflected its controversial nature. Writing in Revue Biblique, Jerome Murphy-O'Connor called attention to the radical nature of Hoffmann's theory while asserting that it was "unlikely that a book of equal importance will appear in this generation." J. L. Houlden commended Hoffmann's skill in "reading between the lines" of Marcion's ancient critics and called the book "a model of how doctrinal history should now be written", while George E. Saint-Laurent concluded, "[H]ereafter Marcion's positive contribution to the mainstream tradition of Catholic-Orthodox Christianity so far as the decisive role of Paul is concerned will have to be acknowledged." Other reviewers thought that Hoffmann's examination of the evidence was valuable but that his conclusions could only be regarded as speculative. The book received a very negative assessment from C. P. Bammel, who accused the author of numerous historical errors and misinterpretations of patristic texts. In a book published in 1993, Bart D. Ehrman noted that Hoffmann's Marcion had "not been well received".

Hoffmann responded to critics of the Marcion in a special issue of The Second Century. His thesis has since been revisited by New Testament scholars including David Trobisch, Joseph Tyson and Robert M. Price.

=== Ancient critics of Christianity ===
Hoffmann has also published English translations of three early pagan opponents of Christianity. In each case, the original work has been lost but the arguments have survived through contemporary works written to refute them. The first, Celsus: On the True Doctrine was published in 1987. Hoffmann recreated the arguments of Celsus using the work Contra Celsum, written by Origen of Alexandria. Theology professor William Weinrich commented that Hoffmann "wisely forgoes any attempt to restore the original order of Celsus' work, opting rather to present Celsus' writing thematically." Others have criticized Hoffman's recreations of Celsus as misrepresentative.

In 1994 Hoffmann published Porphyry: Against the Christians (the Literary Remains). Hoffmann's work is a new translation based on a 15th-century manuscript preserved by Macarius Magnes. The author of the criticisms in that manuscript is not known with certainty. The argument that the critic was Porphyry was first advanced by the historian Adolph von Harnack, though his theory has been disputed. In a recent translation of the contemporary works citing Against the Christians, Robert M. Berchman notes that Hoffmann's translation is "an important contribution to the study of the text."

In 2004 he published a translation of Julian: Against the Galileans, a work by the last non-Christian Roman Emperor, Julian. Julian's arguments survived through the work Contra Julianum written by Cyril of Alexandria.

=== The "Jesus Project" ===
In 2007 Hoffmann, together with New Testament scholars Robert Price and Gerd Lüdemann, announced the formation of a colloquium to re-examine the traditions for the existence of a historical Jesus. The initial meeting of the so-called "Jesus Project " took place in Amherst, NY, December 5–7, 2008 and included fifteen scholars from a variety of disciplines including James Tabor, Robert Eisenman, and Bruce Chilton. The Project, according to Hoffmann, was designed to determine "what can be reliably recovered about the historical figure of Jesus, his life, his teachings, and his activities, utilizing the highest standards of scientific and scholarly objectivity". The Project was seen as a continuation and modification of the Jesus Seminar, founded by Robert Funk and John Dominic Crossan.

In 2009 the Center for Inquiry de-funded the Jesus Project and discontinued CSER. He wrote that there were problems with adherents to the Christ myth theory, the idea that Jesus did not exist, asking to set up a separate section of the project for those committed to the theory, which Hoffmann felt signalled a lack of necessary skepticism. He was also concerned that the media was sensationalizing the project, with the only newsworthy conclusion being that Jesus had not existed, a conclusion he said most participants would not have reached. In 2012, Hoffmann wrote concerning the "Jesus Process" where he extensively criticized christ myth theory and its proponents.

== Humanist and atheist criticisms ==
Though Hoffmann self-identifies as a humanist, he has criticized many aspects of contemporary humanism and atheism. In 2007, following comments from Greg Epstein, the Humanist Chaplain at Harvard, suggesting that atheist authors Sam Harris and Richard Dawkins were "atheist fundamentalists", Hoffmann wrote a publicly posted letter that called Epstein confused and accused him of abusing the Harvard name to stake out his own divisive position. He further criticized Epstein's "New Humanism" as "Gen-X humanism for the passionately confused".

Hoffmann has also criticised the tactics employed by the New Atheist movement. In a 2009 blog post discussing the Center for Inquiry's Blasphemy Day, he wrote that New Atheism is "really nothing more than the triumph of the jerks". Commenting about the American Humanist Association's selection of P.Z. Myers as 2009 Humanist of the Year, he wrote "humanism, infused and high-jacked by the "new" atheism, has been turned into a parody of serious humanist principles and ideals". Hoffmann has also decried the lack of historical theological knowledge of many New Atheism proponents, criticizing the work of atheist writers Richard Dawkins, Sam Harris and Daniel Dennett as being historically naive in a 2006 Free Inquiry article.

Hoffman has criticized the documentary film The Lost Tomb of Jesus (2007), rejecting the filmmakers' conclusion that the Talpiot Tomb was the burial place of Jesus and his family. He has also criticized the sensationalism attached to The Da Vinci Code as a confusing blend of history and fiction.

Hoffmann has also criticized supporters of the Christ myth theory, a theory which he has called "fatally flawed".

== Selected works ==
- Marcion: On the Restitution of Christianity, author, (Scholars Press, August 1984, Oxford University Press, 1995), ISBN 0-89130-638-2
- Celsus: On the True Doctrine, translator, editor, (Oxford University Press, February 19, 1987) ISBN 0-19-504151-8
- Jesus Outside the Gospels, author, (Prometheus Books, February 1987) ISBN 0-87975-387-0
- What the Bible Really Says, editor, with Morton Smith (Harper and Row, May 1993) ISBN 0-06-067443-1
- The Secret Gospels: A Harmony of Apocryphal Jesus Traditions, editor, (Prometheus Books, April 1996) ISBN 1-57392-069-X
- Porphyry's Against the Christians: The Literary Remains, editor and translator, (Prometheus Books, July 1994) ISBN 0-87975-889-9
- Julian's Against the Galileans, editor and translator, (Prometheus Books, November 2004) ISBN 1-59102-198-7
- "Myth and Christianity: A New Introduction," in Karl Jaspers and Rudolf Bultmann, Myth and Christianity: An Inquiry into the Possibility of Religion Without Myth, (Farrar, Straus, and Giroux, May 6, 2005), ISBN 1-59102-291-6
- The Just War and Jihad: Violence in Judaism, Christianity, and Islam, editor, (Prometheus Books, January 2, 2006) ISBN 1-59102-371-8
- Jesus the Nazarene: Myth or History?, introduction, (Prometheus Books, April 21, 2006) ISBN 1-59102-370-X
- "Beyond the Discontinuity Paradigm: Towards a Pan-African Church History", Journal of Religious History, 21 (2), 136–158. Blackwell Publishing
- Sources of the Jesus Tradition: Separating History from Myth, editor, (Prometheus Books, November 2010) ISBN 1-61614-189-1
