= Jesus Project =

American research project (2007–2009)

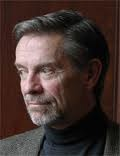
- R. Joseph Hoffmann, initiator of the project
- Formation: 2007; 19 years ago
- Founder: R. Joseph Hoffmann
- Dissolved: June 2009; 17 years ago
- Purpose: To determine what, if anything, can be recovered about the historical Jesus of Nazareth
- Members: limited to 50
- Parent organization: Westar Institute

The Jesus Project, announced in December 2007, was intended as a five-year investigation to examine whether Jesus existed as a historical figure. Plans envisaged that a group of 32 scholars from a variety of disciplines would meet regularly with no preconceived ideas, funded by the Committee for the Scientific Examination of Religion, part of the Center for Inquiry.

Initiated by historian of religion R. Joseph Hoffmann, chair of the Committee, the project sought to improve upon what Hoffmann saw as the failure of the Jesus Seminar to determine what, if anything, can be recovered about Jesus, using the highest standards of scientific and scholarly enquiry. The Committee suspended the Project's funding in June 2009 after Hoffmann expressed concern about its purpose and direction; the Project has not been active since then.

== Intention ==
As reported in a press release, Hoffmann's goal was:

...not to 'disprove' Jesus or to sensationalize the question of his existence, but to acknowledge the question and examine it impartially—without theological or apologetic constraints. The Jesus Project is an attempt to evaluate every scrap of evidence for the historical Jesus, but it is also an attempt to evaluate the quality of the evidence itself—something that earlier projects did not do explicitly. This new project will be more inclusive and rigorous in its approach. It will include scholars from a variety of areas outside biblical and religious studies, including archaeologists, social historians, classicists and people in historical linguistics.

The Jesus Project will be limited to 50 members; scholars plan to meet twice a year, with geographical venues changing each year. The meetings and discussions will also be open to the public. The work of the seminar will consist of the writing of unanimous opinions, and where that is not possible, majority and minority opinions, written as articles, which will be gathered and published once a year under the CSER imprint with Prometheus Books. The work of the Project is limited to five years; at which point a final report will be issued by the committee members."

== Membership ==
Its fellows included Richard Carrier, Bruce Chilton, Robert Eisenman, Dorothy King, Paul Kurtz, Stephen Law, Niels Peter Lemche, Gerd Lüdemann, Dennis MacDonald, Justin J. Meggitt, Robert M. Price, James M. Robinson, Richard E. Rubenstein, James D. Tabor, Frank Zindler and Thomas L. Thompson. The first meeting took place in New York in December 2008.

== Termination ==
The project was halted in June 2009 when Hoffmann announced that in his view the project was not productive, and its funding was suspended. He wrote that there were problems with adherents to the Christ myth theory, the idea that Jesus did not exist, asking to set up a separate section of the project for those committed to the theory, which Hoffmann felt signalled a lack of necessary skepticism. He was also concerned that the media was sensationalizing the project, with the only newsworthy conclusion being that Jesus had not existed, a conclusion he said most participants would not have reached.

He also argued that New Testament documents, particularly the Gospels, were written at a time when the line between natural and supernatural was not clearly drawn, and concluded that further historical research was not realistic. "No quantum of material discovered since the 1940s, in the absence of canonical material, would support the existence of a historical founder," he wrote. "No material regarded as canonical and no church doctrine built upon it in the history of the church would cause us to deny it. Whether the New Testament runs from Christ to Jesus or Jesus to Christ is not a question we can answer."

== See also ==
- Christ myth theory
- Jesus Seminar
