= Anne Primavesi =

Irish Catholic theologian

- Born: Anne Sheridan; 1934; Dublin
- Died: 4 May 2019 (aged 84–85)
- Occupation: Catholic theologian
- Website: http://primavesi.org

Anne Primavesi (1934 – 4 May 2019), born Anne Sheridan, was an Irish Catholic theologian, with a focus on ecological and feminist theology.

== Early life and education ==
Sheridan was born in Dublin. She graduated from University of London and from Heythrop College, University of London.

== Career ==
From 1990 Primavesi was a founding member of the European Society of Women in Theological Research (ESWTR). She presented her ecological ideas at the World Council of Churches, with the 1992 Earth Summit. She wrote a trilogy on James Lovelock's Gaia philosophy. She became a Research Fellow at University of Bristol, where she offered a course in environmental theology. In 1997 she moved to the Centre for the Interdisciplinary Study of Religion at Birkbeck, University of London. In 2002 she became a Fellow of the Jesus Seminar and Westar Institute at Willamette University.

Primavesi traveled widely as a lecturer. She spoke to a student group in Toronto in 1992. She was a featured speaker at a Westar Institute event in California in 2004.

== Personal life ==
Sheridan married Mark Primavesi. She died in 2019, in her eighties.

== Works ==
=== Books ===
- Primavesi, Anne; Henderson, Jennifer (1989). Our God has no favourites: a liberation theology of the Eucharist. Tunbridge Wells: Burns & Oates [u.a.] ISBN 978-0-89390-165-3.
- Primavesi, Anne (31 December 1990). From Apocalypse to Genesis. Minneapolis: Augsburg Fortress Publishing. ISBN 978-0-8006-2522-1.
- Primavesi, Anne (11 September 2002). Sacred Gaia. Routledge. ISBN 978-1-136-93303-5.
- Primavesi, Anne (1 March 2004). Gaia's Gift. Routledge. ISBN 978-1-134-44265-2.
- Primavesi, Anne (2004). Making God Laugh. Santa Rosa, Calif: Polebridge Press. ISBN 978-0-944344-69-9.
- Primavesi, Anne (2009). Gaia and Climate Change. London; New York: Taylor & Francis US. ISBN 978-0-415-47158-9. OCLC 212908717.
- Primavesi, Anne (2011). Cultivating Unity Within the Biodiversity of God. Polebridge Press. ISBN 978-1-59815-031-5.
- Primavesi, Anne (28 August 2014). Exploring Earthiness. Cambridge, U.K: Lutterworth Press. ISBN 978-0-7188-4224-6.

=== Articles, essays, and chapters ===
- "Reviewing and Realising" (1981)
- "The Witness of the Holy Spirit" (1989, with Jennifer Henderson)
- "The Part for the Whole? An Ecofeminist Inquiry" (1990)
- "The God of Altar and the God of Earth" (1991)
- "The Recovery of Wisdom: Gaia Theory and Environmental Policy" (2004)
- "Transforming the Theological Climate in Response to Climate Change: Jesus and the Mystery of Giving" (2009)
- "What's in a Name? Gaia and the Reality of Being Alive in a Relational World" (2010)
- "What Does it Mean to be Human Today?" (2012)
- "Theology and Earth System Science" (2019)
- "The Preoriginal Gift — And Our Response to It" (2020, published posthumously)
