= Committee for the Scientific Examination of Religion =

Nonprofitable educational organization

The Committee for the Scientific Examination of Religion (CSER) was based at the Center for Inquiry in Amherst, New York. According to its mission statement, CSER was a research consultation devoted "to the study of religion and ethics from the standpoint of philosophical naturalism and to the critical, nonparochial, and humanistic study of religious truth claims." The committee professed to serve both a "watchdog" function in relation to church-state and educational issues, and the academic community through generating original research and promoting religious literacy. The CSER was disbanded in 2010.

CSER was described as a nonprofit educational organization which "locates its values in the humanistic principles of the American and European Enlightenment and the liberal critical traditions of post-Enlightenment culture." The committee consisted of approximately one hundred elected fellows chosen from academe and the professions. Past fellows included Van Harvey, Joseph L. Blau, Carol Meyers, Morton Smith, Karen Armstrong, Vern Bullough, Joseph Fletcher, Lewis Feuer, Theodor Gaster, Gerd Lüdemann, Antony Flew, John Hick, David Noel Freedman, John Dominic Crossan, Alan Ryan, Don Cupitt, Margaret Chatterjee, Richard Taylor, Susan Blackmore, Robert Carroll, Arthur Peacocke, Clinton Bennett and Peter Atkins.

== History ==
The committee was formed in 1985 as an expansion of the Religion and Biblical Criticism Research Project founded by Free Inquiry magazine in 1982. The former group promoted a number of projects that scrutinized conservative and fundamentalist religious beliefs and institutions. The two men primarily responsible for organizing this group were the philosopher Paul Kurtz and the professor of archaeology and Biblical history at the University of Southern California Gerald A. Larue.

One early project of this group was a national conference in Washington, DC. The conference, sponsored by the Council for Democratic and Secular Humanism (CODESH), was in response to President Ronald Reagan’s signing of the Congressional Resolution J-5018, which declared 1983 the "Year of the Bible." The conference included presentations by academics, politicians, and religious leaders who were concerned that the passage of the Resolution constituted a violation of the constitutional protection of freedom of conscience in religious matters and a circumvention of the principle of separation of church and state, as defined in the First Amendment. The participants included Senators Sam Ervin (D-North Carolina), Lowell Weicker (R-Connecticut), Professor James Robinson, Henry Steele Commager, Arthur Schlesinger Jr., Michael Novak, Paul Kurtz, and Gerald A. Larue.

The founding members of CSER represented a wide variety of secular and religious viewpoints. Its "manifesto" was crafted in broadly humanistic language which pointed to public ignorance of Constitutional axioms, deficiencies in the public understanding of religion, science, and political history, and particular weaknesses in the American educational system in teaching about religion.

Since 1983, CSER's conferences have presented religious studies scholarship to the public as well as to the academic community. The committee has widened its scope and membership base through the years to reflect its interest in the critical examination of religious traditions in a global context. CSER has sponsored educational programs and conferences in America, Europe, Asia, Africa, and Latin America.

Larue was elected the first Chair of CSER in 1983. R. Joseph Hoffmann (History of Religion, Center for Inquiry, Amherst, NY), formerly chair of the Oxford Centre for Critical Studies in Religion was elected CSER Chairperson in 2003.

The committee published its own monograph series and a journal, CSER Quarterly.
