= Authorship of the Petrine epistles =

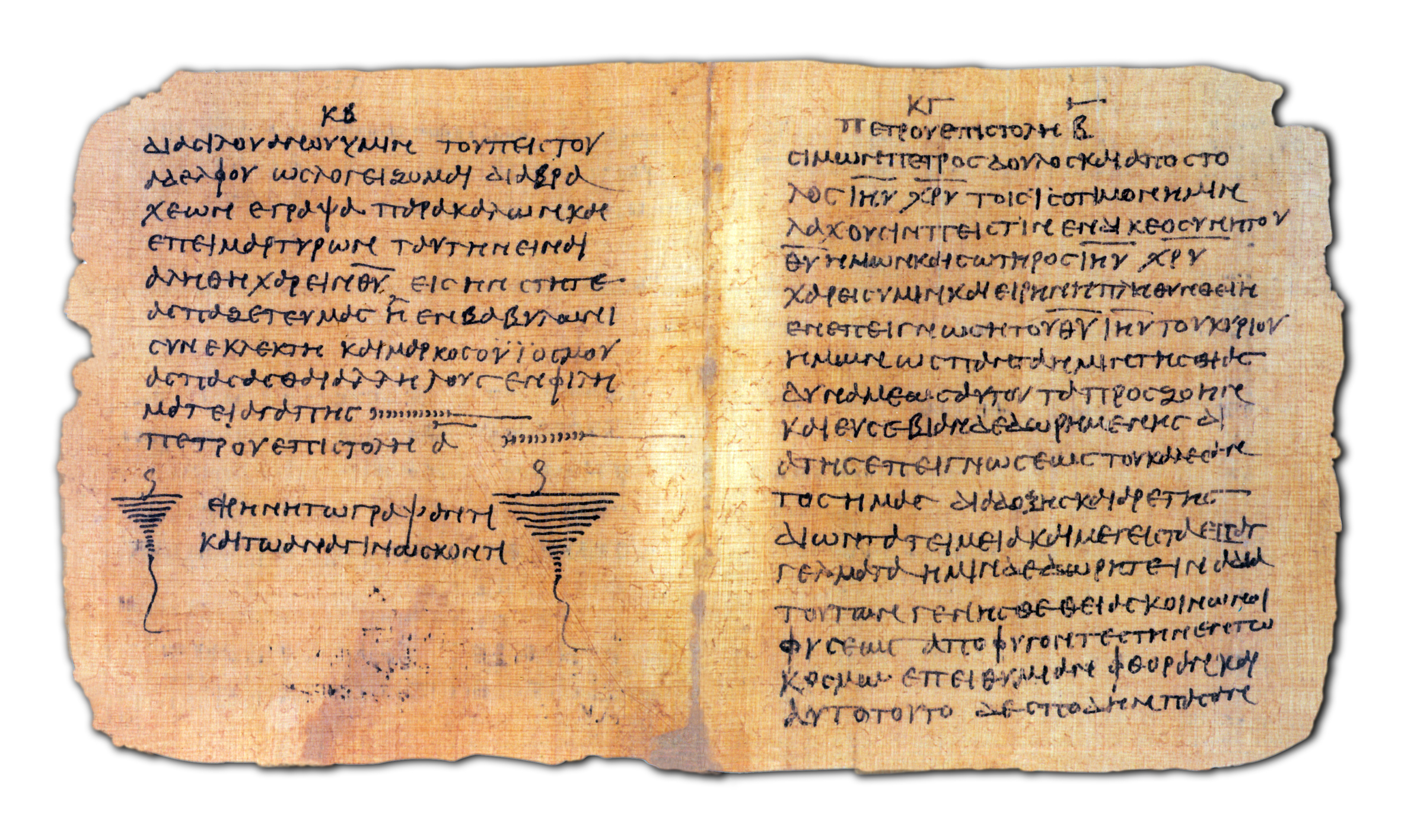
Papyrus 72 (3rd/4th century AD) showing the end of 1 Peter and beginning of 2 Peter

The authorship of the Petrine epistles (1 Peter and 2 Peter) is a question in biblical criticism, parallel to that of the authorship of the Pauline epistles, in which scholars have sought to determine the exact authors of the New Testament letters. The vast majority of biblical scholars think the two epistles do not share the same author, due to wide differences in Greek style and views between the two letters. Most scholars today conclude that Peter the Apostle was the author of neither of the two epistles that are attributed to him. (Note: Attributed to multiple sources:)

== Peter's ability to write ==
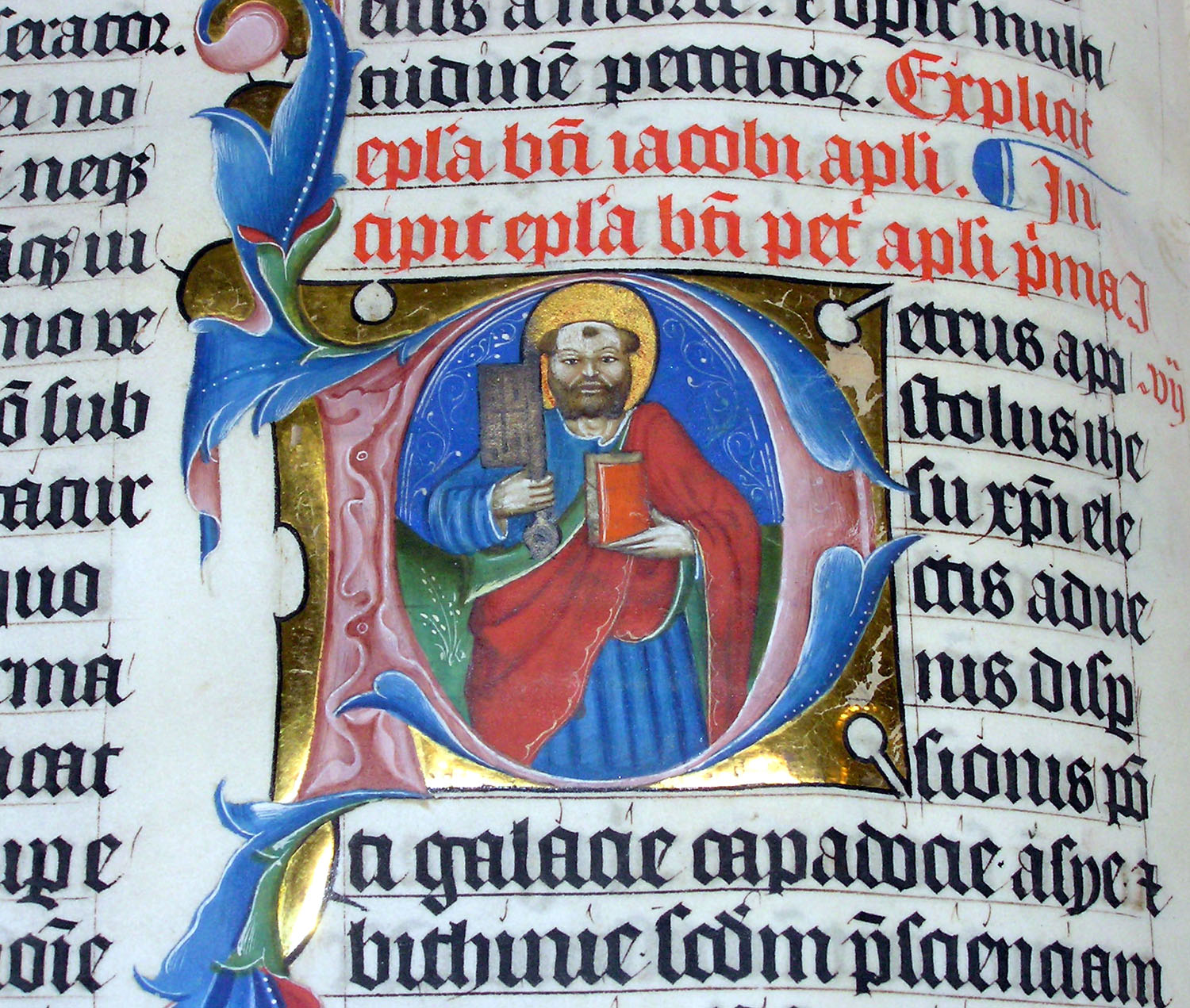
Initial of 1 Peter from the 1407 Malmesbury Bible; Peter holds a key and carries a book, symbolizing either the Book of Life or his own epistles.

An issue common to both epistles of Peter, as well as various non-canonical works that claim to be written by Peter, is whether Peter even had the capability to write them. Peter is described in Acts 4:13 as "uneducated and ordinary" (NRSV). The Koine Greek agrammatoi (ἀγράμματοι) can be literally translated as "unlettered" or "illiterate". More generally, Peter is agreed to be a fisherman from Capernaum, a comparatively small and likely monolingual town. In the era of Roman Judea, literacy was rare, the ability to write rarer still, and the ability to write detailed philosophical tracts (rather than simple receipts and contracts) rarest of all. What advanced literacy training did exist was almost exclusively taught to the children of the elite in large towns such as Jerusalem, rather than fishermen in small towns. Consequently, most scholars find Acts' claim that Peter was uneducated credible. While it is of course possible that Peter embarked upon adult education later in his life after the time period Acts described, such a feat would have been highly unusual for the era. Even if Peter did pursue education later in life, there is little indication that Peter would have learnt or spoken fluent Greek in his livelihood before Jesus's call, as multilingualism was generally seen only in towns closely involved in trade. So Peter would not only have had to learn writing, but also a new language.

There is a line in the 2nd-century Acts of Peter where Peter says "we have written down [the Holy Scriptures of our Lord]", although this tradition may itself have been affected by belief Peter (and the others included with "we"?) wrote 1 Peter, and thus not be an independent source. More generally, early Christian tradition generally remembers Peter as a preacher and church leader rather than a writer. Peter is not usually associated with writing epistles in various 1st-, 2nd-, and 3rd-century Christian works (with the obvious exception of the four allegedly Petrine epistles themselves), and later works wishing to invoke Peter's authority usually used homilies, dialogues, and revelations often attributed to other writers such as Clement.

There exist a number of possibilities whereby Peter could have been the source of the epistles attributed to him without directly writing them. The "secretary" hypothesis is the most common of these, that Peter either dictated to a literate associate or perhaps even just summarized the gist of his thoughts while the secretary turned it into a proper Greek letter. In one version of this, Peter did learn spoken Greek, but dictated the letters to a secretary capable of writing Greek. This still assumes a truly impressive leap in education for Peter late in his life; the epistle 1 Peter is in fluent Greek and the author well acquainted with the Septuagint, the Greek translation of the Old Testament.

Another version that assumes less of Peter is that he dictated in Aramaic, while the secretary translated to Greek. An issue against this possibility is that the letters do not show signs of Aramaic speech patterns turned into Greek ones; if this occurred, then the secretary modified the message sufficiently well to turn the passage into Greek idiom and style rather than Aramaic idiom and style. Another possibility is that the letter was composed by a Greek-writing associate of Peter, summarizing Peter’s general thoughts. Finally, it is possible that the author was a disciple of Peter who wrote later in Peter's honor, especially if the date of composition is believed to be well after Peter's death (such as 2 Peter). The difficulty with the final two is that the letters directly identify themselves as being directly from Peter; if a coauthor was involved, the letters would be more properly identified as coming from the coauthor under Peter's guidance or inspiration. Additionally, for the final possibility of a disciple writing in Peter's honor, any proof that such an unknown author indeed knew Peter closely, rather than simply giving his own personal views to Peter, has long since vanished.

== First epistle ==
=== Author identifies himself as Peter ===
The author of the First Epistle of Peter identifies himself in the opening verse as "Peter, an apostle of Jesus", and the view that the epistle was written by St. Peter is attested to by a number of Church Fathers: Irenaeus (140–203), Tertullian (150–222), Clement of Alexandria (155–215) and Origen of Alexandria (185–253). If Polycarp, who was martyred in 156, and Papias alluded to this letter, then it must have been written before the mid-2nd century. However, the Muratorian Canon (c. 170–200 AD) did not contain this, and a number of other General epistles, suggesting they were not yet being read in the Western churches. Unlike the Second Epistle of Peter, the authorship of which was debated in antiquity (see also Antilegomena), there was little debate about Peter's authorship of the First Epistle of Peter until the advent of biblical criticism in the 18th century.

=== Theory of Silvanus as author ===
One theory is that 1 Peter was written by a secretary such as Mark or by Silvanus, who is mentioned towards the end of the epistle: "By Silvanus, our faithful brother, as I account him, I have written unto you briefly" (5:12). In the following verse the author includes greetings from "she that is in Babylon, elect together with you," taken for the church "in Babylon", which may be an early use of this Christian title for Rome, familiar from the Book of Revelation.

=== Use of Greek and Hebrew ===
Many scholars believe the author was not Peter, but an unknown author writing after Peter's death. Estimates for the date of composition range from 60 to 112 AD. Most critical scholars are skeptical that the apostle Simon Peter, the fisherman on the Sea of Galilee, actually wrote the epistle, because of the urbane cultured style of the Greek and the lack of any personal detail suggesting contact with the historical Jesus of Nazareth. The letter contains about thirty-five references to the Hebrew Bible, all of which, however, come from the Septuagint translation, an unlikely source for historical Peter the apostle, but appropriate for a Hellenized audience; thus the use of the Septuagint helps define the audience. The Septuagint was a Greek translation that had been created at Alexandria for the use of those Jews who could not easily read the Hebrew and Aramaic of the Tanakh, and for proselytes. A historical Jew in Galilee would not have heard Scripture in this form, it is argued.

=== Pseudepigraphy written around 70–90 ===
If the epistle is taken to be pseudepigraphal, the majority scholarly view is that it should be dated to 70–90. Stephen L. Harris, on the other hand, argues for an even later date, such as during the persecution of Domitian (c. 95) or of Trajan (c. 112).

=== Authority associated with Peter ===
The author's use of Peter's name demonstrates the authority associated with Peter. The author also claims to have witnessed the sufferings of Christ (1 Peter 5:1) and makes allusions to several historical sayings of Jesus indicative of eyewitness testimony (e.g., compare Luke 12:35 with 1 Peter 1:13, Matthew 5:16 with 1 Peter 2:12, and Matthew 5:10 with 1 Peter 3:14).

== Second Epistle ==
=== Author presents himself as Peter ===
The Second Epistle of Peter opens by identifying the author as "Simon Peter (in some translations, 'Simeon' or 'Shimon'), a servant and an apostle of Jesus Christ" (2 Peter 1:1). Elsewhere, the author clearly presents himself as the Apostle Peter, stating that the Lord revealed to him the approach of his own death (2 Peter 1:14), that he was an eyewitness of the Transfiguration (2 Peter 1:16–18), that he had previously written another epistle to the same audience (2 Peter 3:1; cf. 1 Peter), and he called Paul the Apostle "our beloved brother" (2 Peter 3:15).

=== Clues in support of pseudepigraphy ===
Although 2 Peter internally purports to be a work of the apostle, most biblical scholars have concluded that Peter is not the author, and instead consider the epistle pseudepigraphical. Reasons for this include its linguistic differences from 1 Peter, its apparent use of Jude, possible allusions to 2nd-century gnosticism, encouragement in the wake of a delayed Second Coming (parousia), and weak external support. In addition, specific passages offer further clues in support of pseudepigraphy, namely the author's assumption that his audience is familiar with multiple Pauline epistles (2 Peter 3:15–16), his implication that the Apostolic generation has passed (2 Peter 3:4), and his differentiation between himself and "the apostles of the Lord and Savior" (2 Peter 3:2).

The assumed theology and intellectual background is also markedly different from both 1 Peter and references to Peter elsewhere: 2 Peter features a "markedly gentile Christian theology, which is in dialogue with views of Greek philosophical cosmology," with no references to Judaism.

=== Arguments for Petrine authorship ===
A minority of scholars have disagreed with this position and put forward reasons in support of genuine Petrine authorship. They argue that the letter did not fit a specific pattern of what they consider pseudepigraphy. The Transfiguration lacks the embellishment which E. M. B. Green argues was common in apocryphal books. Michael Kruger argues that the voice of God in the Transfiguration is similar but not identical to the synoptic gospels, as if Peter was recalling from memory, and notes that the epistle uses similar language to Peter's speeches in Acts. An uncommon title, "our beloved brother," is given to Paul, where later literature used other titles.

=== Relation between 2 Peter and Jude ===
2 Peter shares a number of passages with the Epistle of Jude, 1:5 with Jude 3; 1:12 with Jude 5; 2:1 with Jude 4; 2:4 with Jude 6; 2:6 with Jude 7; 2:10–11 with Jude 8–9; 2:12 with Jude 10; 2:13–17 with Jude 11–13; 3:2f with Jude 17f; 3:14 with Jude 24; and 3:18 with Jude 25. Because the Epistle of Jude is much shorter than 2 Peter, and due to various stylistic details, the scholarly consensus is that Jude was the source for the similar passages of 2 Peter.

Other scholars argue that even if 2 Peter used Jude, that does not exclude Petrine authorship. On remaining points, Ben Witherington III argued that the text we have today is a composite, including points taken from the Epistle of Jude, but that it contains a genuine "Petrine fragment", which he identified as 2 Peter 1:12–21. Finally, some scholars have proposed that differences in style could be explained by Peter having employed different amanuenses (secretaries) for each epistle, or if Peter wrote the second letter himself, while using Silvanus (Silas) as an amanuensis for the first.

=== Two different authors ===
Most scholars believe that 1 Peter and 2 Peter were not written by the same author(s). 1 Peter is essentially traditional, drawing on key Psalms, key chapters of Isaiah, and wisdom sayings, some of which are found elsewhere in the New Testament. 2 Peter, however, favors a more allusive style and is dependent on more obscure sources.

=== Issue of authorship of 2 Peter already settled for most scholars ===
The great majority of scholars agree that Peter has not written this letter. For example, textual critic Daniel Wallace (who maintains that Peter was the author) writes that, for most experts, "the issue of authorship is already settled, at least negatively: the apostle Peter did not write this letter" and that "the vast bulk of NT scholars adopt this perspective without much discussion". Werner Kümmel exemplifies this position, stating, "It is certain, therefore, that 2 Pet does not originate with Peter, and this is today widely acknowledged", as does Stephen L Harris, who states that "[v]irtually no authorities defend the Petrine authorship of 2 Peter." Evangelical scholars D. A. Carson and Douglas J. Moo wrote that "most modern scholars do not think that the apostle Peter wrote this letter. Indeed, for no other letter in the New Testament is there a greater consensus that the person who is named as the author could not, in fact, be the author." Despite this broad denial by the majority of modern scholars, other scholars view the arguments of the majority to be largely inconclusive. Likewise, Stanley Porter points to the fact that 2 Peter's acceptance to the canon by early Christians presumes that they were sure that Peter wrote it. In the end, Carson and Moo point to the controversy reflective of this issue, stating, "We are therefore left with the choice of accepting the letter's prima facie claim to have been written by the apostle Peter or viewing it as a forgery hardly deserving of canonical status."

== Other Petrine literature ==
Various works of New Testament apocrypha are attributed by Peter. In early Christianity, Peter's authority on matters of doctrine was unquestionable, so attributing favored theological views to Peter was reasonably common as a way to buttress arguments that the writer's version of Christian doctrine was the correct one. That said, the form of an epistle was a fairly rare one to attribute to Peter. There are only two other extant epistles attributed to Peter in early Christian writings: the Letter of Peter to Philip (part of the Gnostic Nag Hammadi library) and the Letter of Peter to James (part of the Clementine Homilies). These other three epistles may well have been created only due to the popularity of 1 Peter elevating the idea of Peter as a letter writer within early Christianity. Some other (non-letter) works attributed to Peter include the Apocalypse of Peter, the Gospel of Peter, the Gnostic Apocalypse of Peter, the Arabic Apocalypse of Peter, and the lost Kerygma of Peter which survives only as quoted fragments. For these, there is no debate: both scholars and traditionalist Christians believe that none of them were written by Peter.
