= Stephen L. Harris =

American academic and Professor of Humanities and Religious Studies (1937–2019)

- Born: February 5, 1937; Aberdeen, Washington, U.S.
- Died: April 14, 2019 (aged 82); Sacramento, California, U.S.
- Education: Cornell University
- Spouse: Marjorie Harris
- Children: Geoffrey Harris, Jason Harris
- Parents: Glenn Harris (father); Ruby Harris (mother)

Stephen L. Harris (February 5, 1937 - April 14, 2019) was Professor of Humanities and Religious Studies at California State University, Sacramento. He served there ten years as department chair and was named a Woodrow Wilson Fellow. He received his MA and PhD degrees from Cornell University. Harris was a member of the American Academy of Religion, a fellow at the Westar Institute, a fellow of the Jesus Seminar, and authored several books on religion, some of which are used in introductory university courses.

He also had a strong interest in some geological topics. Harris grew up in western Washington state where the views of Mount Rainier and the mentoring of his grandfather inspired a lifelong interest in the eruptive potential of the volcanoes in the Cascade Mountain range, about which he became a widely known authority.

Harris taught an adult education class on "Evolving Concepts of God" at St. Mark's Methodist Church, Sacramento, using his text, The Old Testament: An Introduction to the Hebrew Bible.

He died of cancer in Sacramento at the age of 82.

== Publications ==
- Harris, Stephen L. (2009). Exploring the Bible. McGraw-Hill. p. 480. ISBN 978-0-07-340736-4.
- Harris, Stephen L. (2008). The New Testament: A Student's Introduction. McGraw-Hill. p. 528. ISBN 978-0-07-287601-7.
- Harris, Stephen L.; Platzner, Robert (2007). The Old Testament: An Introduction to the Hebrew Bible. McGraw-Hill. p. 528. ISBN 978-0-07-299051-5.
- Harris, Stephen L.; Platzner, Gloria (2007). Classical Mythology: Images and Insights. McGraw-Hill. p. 1152. ISBN 978-0-07-353567-8.
- Harris, Stephen L. (2005). Fire Mountains of the West: The Cascade and Mono Lake Volcanoes. Roadside Geology Series (3 ed.). Missoula, Mont.: Mountain Press Publishing Company. pp. 454. ISBN 978-0-87842-220-3.
- Harris, Stephen L. (2000). "Archaeology and Volcanism". In Haraldur Sigurdsson; Bruce Houghton; Hazel Rymer; John Stix; Steve McNutt (eds.). Encyclopedia of Volcanoes. San Diego, Cal.: Academic Press. pp. 1301–1314. ISBN 978-0-12-643140-7.
- Harris, Stephen L. (1990). Agents of Chaos: Earthquakes, Volcanoes and Other Natural Disasters. Missoula, Mont.: Mountain Press Publishing Company. pp. 260. ISBN 9780878422432.
- Harris, Stephen L. (1985). Understanding the Bible. Palo Alto, Cal.: Mayfield.
- Harris, Stephen L. (1980). Fire & Ice: The Cascade Volcanoes. Seattle, Wash.: The Mountaineers and Pacific Search Press. ISBN 0-89886-009-1.
- Restless Earth.(National Geographic Books)
