= Van A. Harvey =

American academic and theologian (1926–2021)

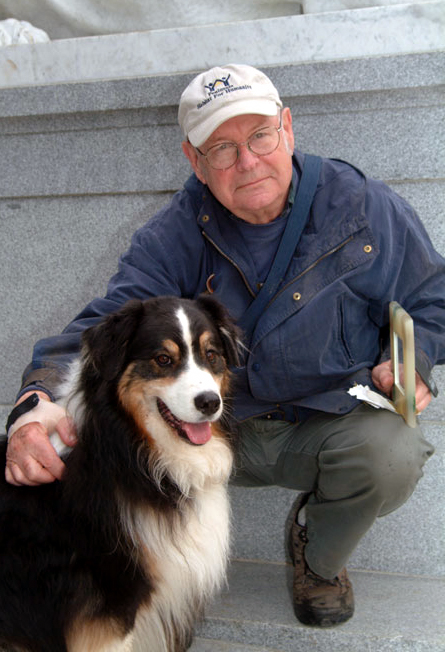
- Born: April 23, 1923; Hankow, China (now Anglicized Hankou)
- Died: July 11, 2021 (aged 95); Palo Alto, California, United States

Academic background
- Doctoral advisor: H. Richard Niebuhr
- Influences: Rudolf Bultmann; Ludwig Feuerbach

Academic work
- Main interests: Religious Thought
- Notable works: Handbook of Theological Terms; The Historian and the Believer; Feuerbach and the Interpretation of Religion
- Influenced: Gerd Lüdemann

Van A. Harvey (1923–2021) was an American Christian theologian. He became George Edwin Burnell Professor of Religious Studies (Emeritus) at Stanford University.

== Life ==
Born in Hankow, China, Harvey served in the U.S. Navy (1943–46), and was awarded a BA in Philosophy from Occidental College (1948, Phi Beta Kappa). After attending Princeton Theological Seminary for one year, he received a B.D. from Yale Divinity School in 1951 and a PhD. from Yale University in 1957 in post-Enlightenment religious thought. His thesis was entitled "Myth, Faith, and History" and his thesis supervisor was H. Richard Niebuhr.–

Van Harvey taught at Princeton University (1954–58), Perkins School of Theology at Southern Methodist University (1958–68), the University of Pennsylvania (1968–78), and Stanford University (1978–1996). He was Chair of the graduate program in religion at SMU and Chair of his departments at both the University of Pennsylvania and Stanford.

The aim of his first book A Handbook of Theological Terms (1964) was to explain to laypersons the meaning of technical terms found in Christian theology, with special attention to issues dividing Protestant and Catholic theology. His second book The Historian and the Believer (1966) was concerned with the way in which "morality of knowledge" that informs professional historical inquiry poses problems for the believer and theologian who attempt to justify the historical claims of Christianity “on faith”, especially when historical inquiry is concerned with Jesus of Nazareth. Harvey argues that these problems have not been satisfactorily dealt with by modern Christian theologians. He pays particular attention to the theologies of Karl Barth, Paul Tillich, and Rudolf Bultmann. New Testament scholar Gerd Lüdemann states in a citation of this book that "I have long been more indebted to this than is evident from the number of explicit references" The third edition of 1996 contains a new introduction outlining his mature position on these issues.

One commentator has characterized Harvey's career after 1980 as having been transformed from theologian into skeptical student of religion. This change is reflected in both his articles and preeminently in his third book Feuerbach and the Interpretation of Religion (1995), winner of the 1996 American Academy of Religion’s award for excellence in constructive-reflective studies. This book argues that the neglected later writings of Ludwig Feuerbach dropped much of the Hegelian elements informing his better-known early work and created a more powerful theory for the origins and persistence of religion. Harvey compares this theory with several well-known contemporary social-scientific and psychological theories and judges Feuerbach's to be superior.

Harvey was awarded an honorary degree in the Humanities from Occidental College, two John Simon Guggenheim Fellowships (1966 and 1972), a National Endowment of the Humanities Fellowship (1979), a Visiting Fellowship from Clare Hall, Cambridge University (1979), and distinguished teaching awards from both the University of Pennsylvania and Stanford University. He contributed to several encyclopedias and reference works including the online Stanford Encyclopedia of Philosophy. Harvey died July 11, 2021.

== Select bibliography ==
- “On Believing What is Difficult to Understand,” Jr. of Rel. 39 (1959), 219-31.
- “D. F. Strauss’ Life of Jesus Revisited,” Church History. 30 (1961), 191-211.
- “Wie Neu ist die ‘Neue Frage nach dem historischen Jesus’?” (with S. M. Ogden), Zeit. f. Theol. u. Kirche, 59 (1962): 46-87 (“How New is the ‘New Quest . . .’ (With S. M. Ogden), The Historical Jesus and the Kerygmatic Christ, eds., C.E. Braaten & R. A. Harrisville, (New York, 1964: 197-242).
- A Handbook of Theological Terms (New York: 1964).
- “The Historical Jesus, the Kerygma, and the Christian Faith,” Rel. in Life 43 (1964) 430-50.
- “The Historian and the Believer” (New York: 1969; Philadelphia: 1981; Urbana, Ill.: 1996 [with a new introduction]).
- “Is There an Ethics of Belief?” Jr. of Rel. 49 (1969), 41-58.
- “A Christology for Barabbases,” Perkins School of Theo. Jour., 29 (1976) 1-13.
- “The Ethics of Belief Reconsidered,” Jr. of Rel., 59 (1979), 406-20.
- “The Dilemma of the Unbelieving Theologian,” Amer. Jr. of Theo. & Phil. 2 (1981), 46-54.
- “Nietzsche and the Kantian Paradigm of Religious Faith” in Witness and Existence, eds., P. E. Devenish & L. Goodwin (Chicago: 1989), 140-161.
- “Feuerbach and the Interpretation of Religion” (Cambridge, Eng.: 1995).
- “Feuerbach on Luther’s Doctrine of Revelation,” Jr. of Rel., 78 (1997), 3-17.
