= Luke Timothy Johnson =

New Testament scholar

- Born: November 20, 1943 (age 82); Park Falls, Wisconsin, U.S.
- Occupations: Robert W. Woodruff Professor of New Testament and Christian Origins at Candler School of Theology
- Known for: Theologian, historian, scholar, former priest
- Spouse: Joy Randazzo (1974–2017; her death)
- Children: 1 (& 6 stepchildren)
- Awards: 2011 University of Louisville Grawemeyer Award in Religion

Academic background
- Education: Notre Dame Seminary; Saint Meinrad School of Theology; Indiana University Bloomington
- Alma mater: Yale University (Ph.D.)

Academic work
- Discipline: New Testament studies
- Institutions: Candler School of Theology, Emory University
- Notable works: The Real Jesus: The Misguided Quest for the Historical Jesus and the Truth of the Traditional Gospels

Luke Timothy Johnson (born November 20, 1943) is an American Catholic New Testament scholar and historian of early Christianity. He is the Robert W. Woodruff Professor of New Testament and Christian Origins at Candler School of Theology and a Senior Fellow at the Center for the Study of Law and Religion at Emory University.

Johnson's research interests encompass the Jewish and Greco-Roman contexts of early Christianity (particularly moral discourse), Luke-Acts, the Pastoral Epistles, and the Epistle of James.

== Early life ==
A native of Park Falls, Wisconsin, Johnson was educated in public and parochial schools. A Benedictine monk and priest at St. Joseph Abbey, St. Benedict, Louisiana from 1963 to 1972, he received a B.A. in Philosophy from Notre Dame Seminary in 1966, a M.Div. in Theology from Saint Meinrad School of Theology in 1970, an M.A. in Religious Studies from Indiana University Bloomington, and a Ph.D. in New Testament from Yale University in 1976. He has taught at St. Meinrad, Saint Joseph Seminary College, Yale Divinity School from 1976 to 1982, and Indiana University from 1982 to 1992.

== Academic career ==
Johnson is a critic of the Jesus Seminar, having taken stances against Burton Mack, Robert Funk and John Dominic Crossan in discussions of the "historical Jesus". Johnson objects to the Seminar's historical methodology. He is also a proponent of an early dating for the Epistle of James, arguing:

The Letter of James also, according to the majority of scholars who have carefully worked through its text in the past two centuries, is among the earliest of New Testament compositions. It contains no reference to the events in Jesus' life, but it bears striking testimony to Jesus' words. Jesus' sayings are embedded in James' exhortations in a form that is clearly not dependent on the written Gospels.

In some areas, Johnson disagrees with Roman Catholic teaching. He has argued that "same-sex unions can be holy and good" and is in favor of "full recognition of gay and lesbian persons within the Christian communion."

Johnson has produced lectures on early Christianity and ancient Greek philosophy for The Teaching Company.

== Recognition ==
He is the recipient of the 2011 University of Louisville Grawemeyer Award in Religion.

== Publications ==
- Johnson, Luke Timothy (1973). Teaching Religion to Undergraduates. Society for Religion in Higher Education.
- ——— (1977). The Literary Function of Possessions in Luke-Acts. Dissertation series (Society of Biblical Literature). Vol. 39. Missoula, Montana: Scholars Press. ISBN 978-0-8913-0200-1. OCLC 3327240.
- ——— (1980). Invitation to the Letters of Paul III: Ephesians, Colossians, Pastorals. (Commentary)
- ——— (1980). The Writings of the New Testament: An Interpretation (1st ed.). Minneapolis, Minnesota: Fortress Press. ISBN 978-0-800-61886-5.
- ——— (1981). Sharing Possessions: Mandate and Symbol of Faith. Overtures to Biblical Theology. Vol. 9. Minneapolis, Minnesota: Fortress Press. ISBN 978-0-800-61534-5. OCLC 7553096.
- ——— (1981). Some Hard Blessings: Meditations on the Beatitudes in Matthew. Argus Communications. ISBN 978-0-8950-5058-8.
- ——— (1982). Luke-Acts: A Story of Prophet and People. Franciscan Herald Press. ISBN 978-0-8199-0524-6.
- ——— (1983). Decision Making in the Church: A Biblical Model. Fortress Press. ISBN 978-0-800-61694-6.
- ——— (1987). 1 Timothy, 2 Timothy, Titus. John Knox Press. ISBN 978-0-8042-3242-5.
- ——— (1990). Faith's Freedom: A Classic Spirituality for Contemporary Christians. Fortress Press. ISBN 978-0-800-62428-6.
- ——— (1991). The Gospel of Luke. Sacra Pagina series. Vol. 3. Collegeville, Minnesota: Liturgical Press. ISBN 978-0-8146-5966-3. OCLC 23733531. (Commentary)
- ——— (1992). The Acts of the Apostles. Sacra Pagina series. Vol. 5. Collegeville, Minnesota: Liturgical Press. ISBN 978-0-8146-5968-7. (Commentary)
- ——— (1993). Proclamation 5: Interpreting the Lessons of the Church Year. Fortress Press. ISBN 978-0-800-64184-9.
- ——— (1995). The Letter of James: A New Translation with Introduction and Commentary. Anchor Bible. Vol. 37a. New York: Doubleday. ISBN 978-0-3854-1360-2. OCLC 31374078. (Commentary)
- ——— (1996). The Real Jesus: The Misguided Quest for the Historical Jesus and the Truth of the Traditional Gospels. San Francisco, California: HarperSanFrancisco. ISBN 978-0-0606-4166-5. OCLC 32625131.
- ——— (1996). Scripture and Discernment: Decision Making in the Church. Abingdon Press. ISBN 978-0-6870-1238-1.
- ——— (1996). Letters to Paul's Delegates: A Commentary on 1 Timothy, 2 Timothy and Titus. New Testament in Context. Valley Forge, Pennsylvania: Trinity Press International. ISBN 978-1-5633-8144-7. OCLC 35360799. (Commentary)
- ——— (1997). Reading Romans: A Literary and Theological Commentary. Reading the New Testament Series. New York: Crossroad Pub. ISBN 978-1573122764. OCLC 35151248. (Commentary)
- ——— (1998). Religious Experience: A Missing Dimension in New Testament Studies. Minneapolis, Minnesota: Fortress Press. ISBN 978-0-800-63129-1. OCLC 39079005.
- ——— (1999). Living Jesus: Learning the Heart of the Gospel. San Francisco, California: HarperSanFrancisco. ISBN 978-0060642839. OCLC 39050865.
- ———; Crossan, John Dominic; Kelber, Werner H. (1999). The Jesus Controversy: perspectives in conflict. Rockwell Lecture Series. Harrisburg, Pennsylvania: Trinity Press International. ISBN 978-1-5633-8289-5. OCLC 41628131.
- ——— (2001). The First and Second Letters to Timothy: A New Translation with Introduction and Commentary. Anchor Bible. Vol. 35a. New York: Doubleday. ISBN 978-0-3854-8422-0. OCLC 43657061. (Commentary)
- ——— (2002). The Writings of the New Testament: An Interpretation (2nd revised ed.). Minneapolis, Minnesota: Fortress Press. ISBN 978-0-334-02911-3.
- ———; Kurz, William S. (2002). Future of Catholic Biblical Scholarship: A Constructive Conversation. Grand Rapids, Michigan: Eerdmans. ISBN 978-0-802-84545-0. OCLC 49902174.
- ——— (2002). Septuagintal Midrash in the Speeches of Acts. Père Marquette lecture in theology. Milwaukee: Marquette University Press. ISBN 978-0-8746-2582-0. OCLC 49011355.
- ——— (2003). The Creed: What Christians Believe and Why it Matters. New York: Doubleday. ISBN 978-0-385-50247-4. OCLC 51534973.
- ——— (2004). Brother of Jesus, Friend of God: Studies in the Letter of James. Grand Rapids, Michigan: Eerdmans. ISBN 978-0-8028-0986-5.
- ——— (2006). Hebrews: A Commentary. New Testament library. Louisville, Kentucky: Westminster, John Knox Press. ISBN 978-0-6642-2118-8. OCLC 62738718. (Commentary)
- ——— (2009). Among the Gentiles: Greco - Roman Religion and Christianity. Anchor Yale Bible Reference Library. New Haven, Connecticut: Yale University Press. ISBN 978-0-300-14208-2. OCLC 444387833.
- ——— (2010). The Writings of the New Testament: An Interpretation (3rd ed.). Minneapolis, Minnesota: Fortress Press. ISBN 978-0-800-66361-2.
- ——— (2010). The New Testament: A Very Short Introduction. Very short introductions. Vol. 229. Oxford; New York: Oxford University Press. ISBN 978-0-199-73570-9. OCLC 438055743.
- ——— (2011). Sharing Possessions: What Faith Demands, Second Edition. Grand Rapids, Michigan: Eerdmans. ISBN 978-0-8028-0399-3.
- ——— (2011). Prophetic Jesus, Prophetic Church: The Challenge of Luke-Acts to Contemporary Christians. Grand Rapids, Michigan: Eerdmans. ISBN 978-0-802-80390-0.
- ——— (2013). Contested Issues in Christian Origins and the New Testament: Collected Essays. Supplements to Novum Testamentum. Brill. ISBN 978-9-0042-4290-6.
- ——— (2015). The Revelatory Body: Theology as Inductive Art. Grand Rapids, Michigan: Eerdmans. ISBN 978-0-8028-0383-2.
- ——— (2020). Constructing Paul (The Canonical Paul, volume 1). Grand Rapids, Michigan: Eerdmans. ISBN 978-0-8028-0758-8.
- ——— (2021). Interpreting Paul (The Canonical Paul, volume 2). Grand Rapids, Michigan: Eerdmans. ISBN 978-0-8028-2466-0.
- ——— (2022). The Mind in Another Place: My Life as a Scholar. Grand Rapids, Michigan: Eerdmans. ISBN 978-0-8028-8011-6.

Johnson is also the author of a large number of scholarly articles, encyclopedia, anthology and popular articles, book reviews, and other academic papers and lectures.
