= Howard Clark Kee =

American scholar and academic

- Born: July 28, 1920; Beverly, NJ
- Died: April 2, 2017 (aged 96); Haverford, PA

Academic background
- Education: Dallas Theological Seminary (Th.M)
- Alma mater: Yale University (Ph.D)

Academic work
- Discipline: New Testament studies
- Institutions: Boston University; University of Pennsylvania; Drew University; Bryn Mawr College
- Notable works: "The Gospel According to Matthew" (1971); The Cambridge Companion to the Bible (1997); What Can We Know About Jesus? (1990); Who Are the People of God? Early Christian Models of Community (1997); The Beginnings of Christianity: An Introduction to the New Testament (2005); Understanding the New Testament (5th ed., 1993); and Jesus in History (3rd ed., 1995)

Howard Clark Kee (Beverly, NJ, July 28, 1920 – Haverford, PA, April 2, 2017) was William Goodwin Aurelio Professor of Biblical Studies Emeritus at Boston University School of Theology (1977–1988) and a visiting faculty member at the University of Pennsylvania.

Kee attended Dallas Theological Seminary, attaining a Th. M. degree in 1944. After earning a PhD from Yale University in 1951, Kee was an instructor in religion and classics at the University of Pennsylvania from 1951 until 1953. He was an assistant professor and professor of New Testament at Drew University from 1953 until 1968. In 1968 he was appointed the Rufus Jones professor of history of religion at Bryn Mawr College where he taught until 1977 when he became the William Goodwin Aurelio professor of Biblical Studies at Boston University, a position he held until his retirement in 1989.

Kee contributed the commentary on "The Gospel According to Matthew" to The Interpreter's One-Volume Commentary On the Bible published by Abingdon Press in 1971.

He wrote 18 books including the first edition of The Cambridge Companion to the Bible (1997); What Can We Know About Jesus? (1990); Who Are the People of God? Early Christian Models of Community (1997); The Beginnings of Christianity: An Introduction to the New Testament (2005); Understanding the New Testament (5th ed., 1993); and Jesus in History (3rd ed., 1995)
