= Marcus Borg =

American theologian, New Testament scholar and writer (1942–2015)

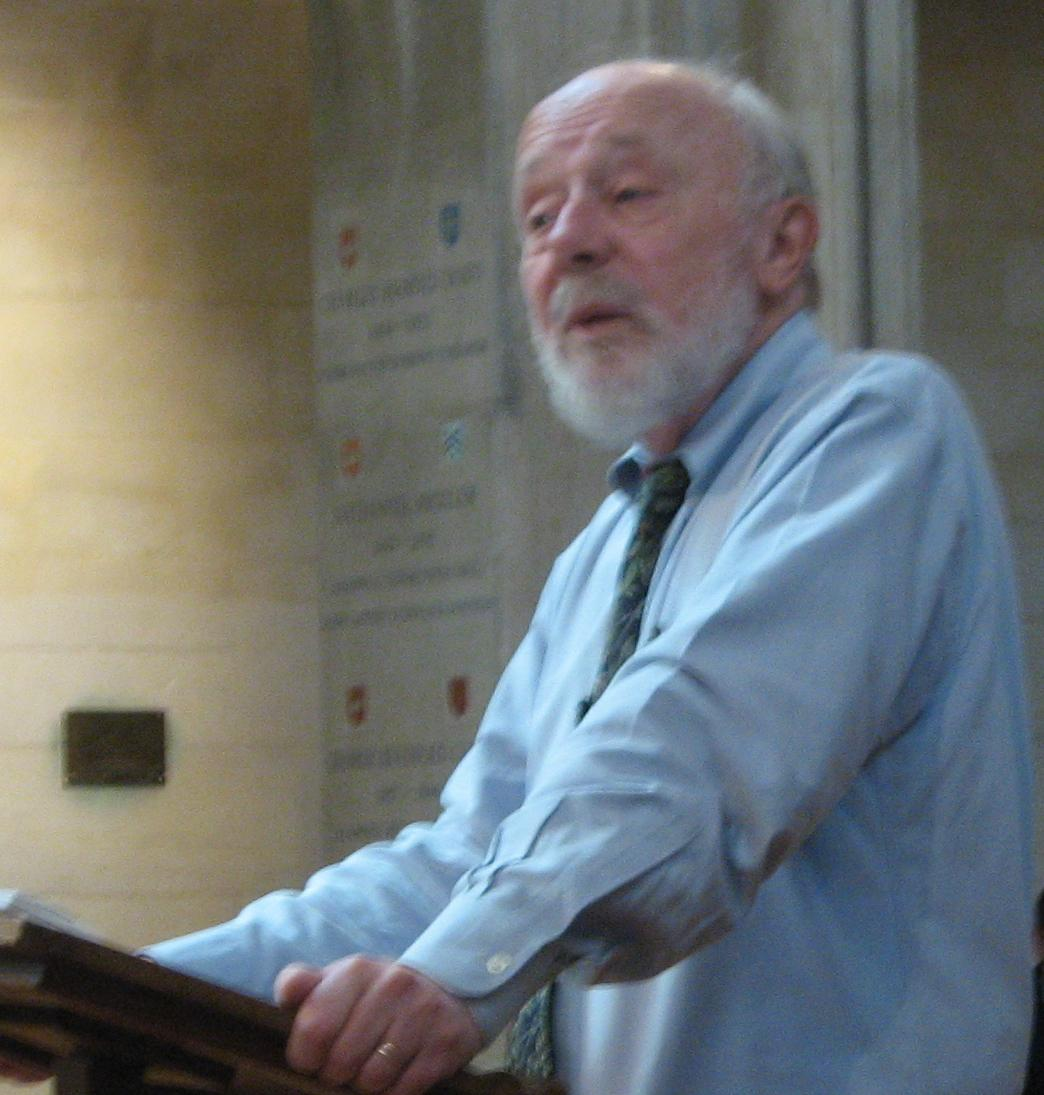
- Borg speaking in Mansfield College chapel
- Born: Marcus Joel Borg; March 11, 1942; Fergus Falls, Minnesota, US
- Died: January 21, 2015 (aged 72); Powell Butte, Oregon, US
- Spouse: Marianne Wells Borg

Academic background
- Education: Concordia College; Mansfield College, Oxford
- Thesis: Conflict as a Context for Interpreting the Teaching of Jesus (1972)
- Doctoral advisor: G. B. Caird
- Influences: W. D. Davies

Academic work
- Discipline: Biblical studies; religious studies; theology
- Sub-discipline: New Testament studies
- School or tradition: Anglicanism; Jesus Seminar; theological liberalism
- Institutions: Oregon State University

Marcus Joel Borg (March 11, 1942 – January 21, 2015) was an American New Testament scholar and theologian. He was among the most widely known and influential voices in Liberal Christianity. Borg was a fellow of the Jesus Seminar and a major figure in historical Jesus scholarship. He retired as Hundere Distinguished Professor of Religion and Culture at Oregon State University in 2007. He died eight years later at the age of 72, of idiopathic pulmonary fibrosis at his home in Powell Butte, Oregon.

== Early life and education ==
Borg was born March 11, 1942, in Fergus Falls, Minnesota, and raised in a Lutheran family in North Dakota. After high school he attended Concordia College in Moorhead, Minnesota, where he double-majored in political science and philosophy. Though plagued by doubt as a young adult, after his undergraduate studies Borg accepted a Rockefeller Brothers Theological Fellowship to study at Union Theological Seminary in New York City, where he became familiarized with liberal theology. A profound influence on Borg during his seminary years was the theologian W. D. Davies. After his studies at Union, he matriculated at Mansfield College, Oxford, where he earned both his Master of Theology and Doctor of Philosophy degrees.

== Career ==
Borg taught at Concordia College in Moorhead, Minnesota, from 1966 to 1969 and 1972 to 1974; South Dakota State University in Brookings from 1975 to 1976; and Carleton College in Northfield, Minnesota, from 1976 to 1979. He was a faculty member at Oregon State University from 1979 until his retirement in 2007 as Distinguished Professor in Religion and Culture and the Hundere Endowed Chair in Religious Studies. Borg was appointed Chair of the Religious Studies Department in January 1988. The Religious Studies Department was closed at the end of the 1991–1992 academic year and Borg became a faculty member in the Philosophy Department. During his time at Oregon State he organized and led two nationally televised symposia, one in 1996 (Jesus at 2000), and another in 2000 (God at 2000). Borg also served as Visiting Professor of New Testament at the Pacific School of Religion, Berkeley (1989–1991) and the Chism Distinguished Visiting Professor at the University of Puget Sound, Tacoma, Washington (1986–1987).

Borg served as national chair of the Historical Jesus Section of the Society of Biblical Literature, co-chair of its International New Testament Program Committee and president of the Anglican Association of Biblical Scholars. On May 31, 2009, he was installed as the first canon theologian at Trinity Episcopal Cathedral, Portland, Oregon.

Borg frequently collaborated with his friend John Dominic Crossan. He was a friend of N. T. Wright since their days together at Oxford, despite having theological differences. The two discussed those differences in their book The Meaning of Jesus: Two Visions (1999, rev. 2007). Borg was often featured in programs on networks such as PBS, NPR and National Geographic, and appeared on ABC World News and The Today Show. In 2001, he debated William Lane Craig over the resurrection of Jesus. Borg also debated New Testament scholar Craig Blomberg and evangelical apologist James White on topics such as the historical reliability of the gospels and the historical Jesus.

Borg died on January 21, 2015, in Powell Butte, Oregon.

== Works ==
=== Books ===
- Borg, Marcus J. (1971). Conflict and Social Change. Minneapolis, MN: Augsburg Press. ISBN 978-0806694610. OCLC 249688883.
- ——— (1976). The Year of Luke: Advent/Christmas/Epiphany. Lectionary Bible Studies. Minneapolis, MN: Augsburg Press. OCLC 3300556.
- ——— (1983). Conflict, Holiness and Politics in the Teachings of Jesus. Studies in the Bible and early Christianity. Vol. 5. Lewiston, New York: Edwin Mellen Press. OCLC 646293845. - based on the author's thesis
- ——— (1987). Jesus: A New Vision: spirit, culture, and the life of discipleship. San Francisco: Harper & Row. ISBN 9780060609146. OCLC 16802118.
- ——— (1994). Jesus in Contemporary Scholarship. Valley Forge, PA: Trinity Press International. ISBN 978-1563380945.
- ——— (1994). Meeting Jesus Again for the First Time: the historical Jesus & the heart of contemporary faith. San Francisco, CA: HarperSanFrancisco. ISBN 9780060609160. OCLC 28293990.
- ——— (1997). The God We Never Knew: Beyond Dogmatic Religion to a More Authentic Contemporary Faith. San Francisco, CA: HarperSanFrancisco. ISBN 978-0060610357. OCLC 36112177.
- ———; Wright, N. T. (1999). The Meaning of Jesus: Two Visions. San Francisco, CA: HarperSanFrancisco. ISBN 9780060608750. OCLC 39659736.
- ——— (2001). Reading the Bible Again for the First Time: Taking the Bible Seriously but Not Literally. San Francisco, CA: HarperSanFrancisco. ISBN 9780060609184. OCLC 45201973.
- ———; Allison, Dale C.; Crossan, John Dominic; Patterson, Stephen J. (2001). Miller, Robert J. (ed.). The Apocalyptic Jesus: A Debate. San Francisco, CA: HarperSanFrancisco. ISBN 978-0944344897. OCLC 52127660.
- ——— (2003). The Heart of Christianity: Rediscovering a Life of Faith. San Francisco, CA: HarperSanFrancisco. ISBN 978-0060730680. OCLC 52127660.
- ——— (2006). Jesus: Uncovering the Life, Teachings, and Relevance of a Religious Revolutionary. San Francisco, CA: HarperSanFrancisco. ISBN 9780060594459. OCLC 71223443.
- ———; Scorer, Tim (2006). Living the Heart of Christianity: A Guide to Putting Your Faith into Action. San Francisco, CA: HarperSanFrancisco. ISBN 9780061118425. OCLC 1031049411.
- ———; Crossan, John Dominic (2006). The Last Week: what the gospels really teach about Jesus's final days in Jerusalem. San Francisco, CA: HarperSanFrancisco. ISBN 9780060872601. OCLC 81290814.
- ———; Crossan, John Dominic (2007). The First Christmas: What the Gospels Really Teach About Jesus' Birth. New York: Harper One. ISBN 9780061430701. OCLC 154686566.
- ———; Crossan, John Dominic (2009). The First Paul: Reclaiming the Radical Visionary Behind the Church's Conservative Icon. New York: HarperCollins. ISBN 9780061430725. OCLC 781193234.
- ——— (2009). Conversations with Scripture - The Gospel of Mark. Anglican Association of Biblical Scholars Study Series. Vol. 6. Harrisburg, NY: Morehouse Publishing. ISBN 9780819223395. OCLC 318413955.
- ——— (2010). Putting Away Childish Things: A Tale of Modern Faith. New York: Harper One. ISBN 9780061888144. OCLC 456180602.
- ——— (2011). Speaking Christian: Why Christian Words Have Lost Their Meaning--and how they can be restored. New York: Harper One. ISBN 9780061976582. OCLC 1054371747.
- ——— (2013). Evolution of the Word: The New Testament in the Order the Books Were Written. New York: Harper One. ISBN 9780062082107. OCLC 760977811.
- ——— (2014). Convictions: How I Learned What Matters Most. New York: Harper One. ISBN 9780062269980. OCLC 914245518. - (published in the UK as Convictions: A Manifesto for Progressive Christians)
- ——— (2017). Days of Awe and Wonder: how to be a Christian in the twenty-first century. New York: Harper One. ISBN 9780062457332. OCLC 974947285.

=== Edited by ===
- ———; Powelson, Mark; Riegert, Ray, eds. (1996). The Lost Gospel Q: The Original Sayings of Jesus. Berkeley, CA: Ulysses Press. ISBN 978-1569751893. OCLC 35548796.
- ———, ed. (1996). Jesus at 2000. Boulder, CO: Westview Press. ISBN 978-0813332536. OCLC 36029201.
- ———; Riegert, Ray, eds. (1997). Jesus and Buddha: The Parallel Sayings. Berkeley, CA: Ulysses Press. ISBN 9781569751213. OCLC 36675971.
- ———; MacKenzie, Ross H., eds. (2001). God at 2000. Harrisburg, PA: Morehouse Publishers. ISBN 9780819218582. OCLC 44769045.

=== Chapters ===
- ——— (1994). "The Palestinian background for a life of Jesus". In Shanks, Hershel (ed.). The Search for Jesus: Modern Scholarship Looks at the Gospels. Washington, DC: Biblical Archaeology Society. pp. 37–58. ISBN 978-1880317143. OCLC 30814637.
- ——— (1994). "Portraits of Jesus". In Shanks, Hershel (ed.). The Search for Jesus: Modern Scholarship Looks at the Gospels. Washington, DC: Biblical Archaeology Society. pp. 83–108. ISBN 978-1880317143. OCLC 30814637.
- ——— (2007). "Executed by Rome, Vindicated by God". In Jersak, Brad; Hardin, Michael (eds.). Stricken by God?: nonviolent identification and the victory of Christ. Grand Rapids, MI: Eerdmans. pp. 150–65. ISBN 978-0-9780174-7-7. OCLC 938602456.
