= Westar Institute =

Christian nonprofit

The Westar Institute, founded by Robert W. Funk in 1985, is a member-supported nonprofit educational institute with a twofold mission:

- To foster collaborative, cumulative research in religious studies
- To communicate the results of the scholarship of religion to a broad, non-specialist public

Westar is located in Salem, Oregon, on the campus of Willamette University. The institute has a publishing arm in the form of Polebridge Press, which publishes books, media, and two journals:

- Forum, an academic journal which publishes scholarly articles on the historical Jesus, Christian origins, and related fields.
- The Fourth R, a bimonthly magazine that publishes religious studies research in nontechnical language for at a general audience.

== Organizational structure ==
Westar is managed by a Board of Directors and staff. Membership is divided into Associate Members, who are members of the public, and Westar Fellows, scholars in the field of religious studies or a cognate discipline. Associate membership provides ongoing support for the organization in the form of annual dues, and is open to anyone with an interest in religion. However, scholars must apply to become Fellows. To become a Fellow, a person must hold an "advanced academic degree (Ph.D. or equivalent) in religious studies or related disciplines with accredited universities worldwide." While there is no required religious affiliation, Fellows do commit to the Ethos & Protocol statement, which includes sharing historical-critical research with the public. The approach taken by the Westar Fellows to their research has drawn criticism from a number of directions.

== Activities ==
Westar sponsors "large-scale, collaborative research projects" called seminars on various topics in early Christian history. The first and most famous of these was the Jesus Seminar on the historical Jesus, which lasted from 1985 to 1993. Other Westar seminars include the Paul Seminar, Acts of Apostles, Christian Origins, and, currently, the Christianity Seminar. While Scholars communicate throughout the year, twice annually they present papers at national meetings with a public audience. Meetings culminate in votes by both Fellows and Associate Members regarding specific historical assertions.

== Voting system ==
The concept of voting on aspects of early Christian life and the accuracy of biblical sayings was not a unique innovation of Westar. Rather, it was based on "the disciplined work of Bible translation committees, a very traditional scholarly practice," based in turn on the more ancient Greek voting system that involved dropping colored beads into an urn. Westar Fellows vote as follows:

- RED: This information is virtually certain; it is supported by a preponderance of the evidence and is accepted as historical.
- PINK: This information is not certain but is probably reliable; it fits well with evidence that is verifiable and so is regarded as borderline historical.
- GRAY: This information is possible but unreliable; it is not a clear fabrication but lacks supporting evidence and so is regarded as dubious.
- BLACK: This information is improbable; it does not fit verifiable evidence or seems to be a fabrication and is regarded as nonhistorical.

Votes are weighted according to historicity. The higher the numerical value, the more historical weight is given to a piece of information. Examples from the Jesus Seminar, as recorded in seminar publication The Five Gospels, include:

- RED: Parable of the Leaven (Matt 13:33)
- PINK: Parable of the Mustard Seed (Matt 13:31-32)
- GRAY: Parable of the Sabotage of Weeds (Matt 13:24-30)
- BLACK: Meaning of the Weeds Parable (Matt 13:37-43a)

== Reactions ==
Because of its emphasis on historical foundations over dogmatic faith, Westar Institute has been criticized by evangelical and fundamentalist-leaning organizations. This criticism has appeared "almost from the moment that they published their first paper on the life and death of Jesus Christ." Moderators of the faith-based site AllAboutReligion.org provide a relevant example: "Critics of the Jesus Seminar [cry] foul because they say that the Jesus Seminar is not subjective in their findings. This criticism is based on the knowledge that the Jesus Seminar eliminates any evidence they cannot explained [sic] using modern scientific principles." Indeed, as the Ethos & Protocol statement of Westar Fellows indicates, the approach of all seminars sponsored by the institute is historical-critical, by definition incongruous with faith-based assertions.

Beyond online forums, books have been published that criticize the work of the Westar Institute, particularly the Jesus Seminar, from the above perspective. Reasons for Our Hope: An Introduction to Christian Apologetics, published in 2011 by H. Wayne House and Dennis W. Jowers, serves as an example. As with the above-cited website, House and Jowers argue that the historical-critical approach of Fellows is problematic: "The starting point [of the Jesus Seminar] is a total rejection of the supernatural, a throwback to the first quest [of the historical Jesus]. ... Any miracle is considered a myth, added later to reflect later beliefs. Thus, there can be no virgin birth, walking on water, or resurrection. Before they even begin their work, the Jesus Seminar decided that anything in the Gospels that supports Jesus being more than just human cannot possibly be true."

House and Jowers describe Westar Institute as "a think tank set up by several liberal academics" and "radical critics of the Bible" among whom, House and Jowers claim on less credible terms, are "only a handful are well-known scholars in the field of New Testament studies" (319). In fact, most Westar Fellows are affiliated in some manner with leading organizations in the field of biblical studies and generally respected academic honors, as is evident in any survey of Fellow biographies on the Westar website. For example, publications and activities of the Fellows frequently include involvement with the leading organization of biblical research, the Society of Biblical Literature (SBL). The SBL published an obituary for Westar founder Robert W. Funk in 2005, in which Funk is credited for his service as the Executive Secretary for the SBL. Likewise another Westar Fellow, Daryl D. Schmidt, was remembered in an obituary on the site in 2006. Furthermore, an article by John Dart, originally a paper presented at the 2006 SBL International Meeting in Edinburgh published in Forum, also in 2006, is featured on the SBL website. As Dart explains: "Unfortunately, there is built-in resistance to popularizing biblical research findings for the general public. First, it is believed that complex, nuanced scholarly arguments tend to get 'lost in translation' to readers and audiences unfamiliar with the terminology and background."

This is not to say Westar has escaped criticism from other scholars. "The most bitter and outspoken critic of the Seminar, Luke Timothy Johnson, published The Real Jesus: The Misguided Quest for the Historical Jesus and the Truth of the Traditional Gospels in 1996." To clarify, Johnson does not come from a fundamentalist perspective; he critiques that perspective as neither modern nor self-critical enough. Nevertheless, he problematizes the deeply unsettling experience of viewing the Bible through an historical-critical lens: "First-year students, who often come to seminary with deeply conservative convictions concerning the inspiration and inerrancy of Scripture, are exposed at once to the 'shock therapy' of the historical critical method." In the spirit of earlier theological perspectives of the twentieth century, Johnson focuses on the Christ of faith over against the Jesus of history as an appropriate focus of studies of Christian life.

Bessler, himself a Westar Fellow, describes Johnson's position as largely dependent on the approach of theologian Martin Kähler, among others, and responds critically to Johnson's criticism of the first-year theology students' experience of the historical method: "Can one also imagine, I wonder, the gall of professors in other graduate departments, in physics for example, or psychology, or cultural anthropology, 'forcing' their students to learn a methodology: How outrageous!"

A more weighty criticism comes from feminist theologian Elisabeth Schüssler Fiorenza for "historical positivism." While Schüssler Fiorenza does not criticize the use of the historical-critical method, she does critique a lack of emphasis on the fact that all historical work is a form of re-construction which "must open up its historical models or patterns to public reflection and critical scrutiny." In other words, in spite of the highly public format of the Westar seminars, Schüssler Fiorenza advocates for greater involvement in explaining and opening methods up to public scrutiny.

== See also ==
- Religious literacy
