= John Dominic Crossan =

Irish-American New Testament scholar (born 1934)

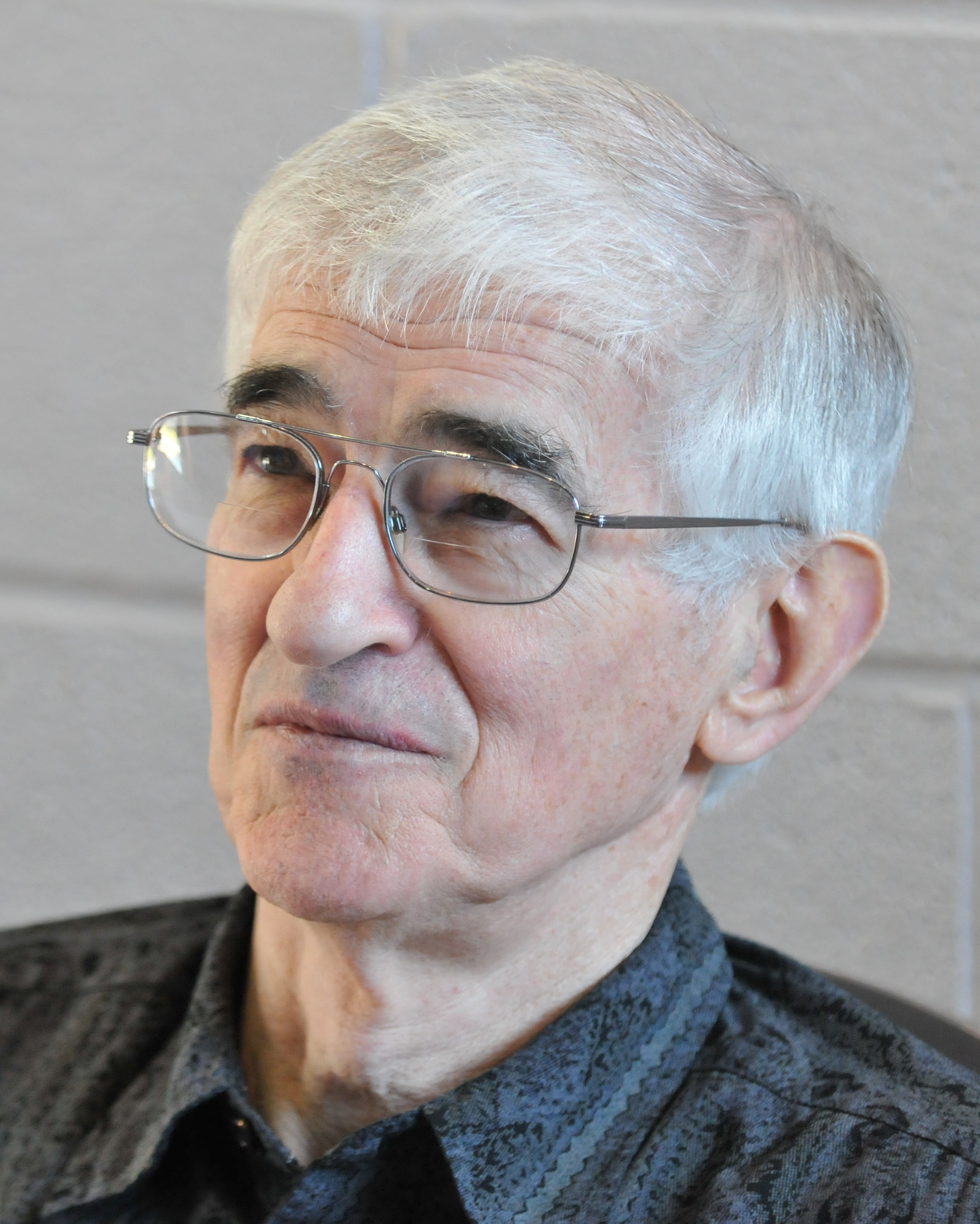
- Crossan in 2008
- Born: 17 February 1934 (age 92); Nenagh, County Tipperary, Ireland
- Known for: Co-chairing the Jesus Seminar
- Spouses: Margaret Dagenais (m. 1969; died 1983); Sarah Sexton (m. 1986)

Academic background
- Education: St Patrick's College, Maynooth
- Influences: Rudolf Bultmann; Martin Heidegger

Academic work
- Discipline: Biblical studies
- Sub-discipline: New Testament studies
- Institutions: Stonebridge Seminary; St. Mary of the Lake Seminary; Catholic Theological Union; DePaul University
- Main interests: Historical Jesus; early Christianity; noncanonical gospels

Ecclesiastical career
- Religion: Christianity (Roman Catholic)
- Church: Latin Church
- Ordained: 1957 (priest)
- Laicized: 1969

John Dominic Crossan (born 17 February 1934) is an Irish-American scholar of the New Testament, historian of early Christianity and former Catholic priest. He was a prominent member of the Jesus Seminar, and is an emeritus professor at DePaul University. His research has focused on the historical Jesus, the theology of noncanonical gospels, and the application of postmodern hermeneutical approaches to the Bible.

His work is controversial, portraying the Second Coming as a late corruption of Jesus' message and saying that Jesus' divinity is metaphorical. In place of the eschatological message of the Gospels, Crossan emphasizes the historical context of Jesus and of his followers immediately after his death. He describes Jesus' ministry as founded on free healing and communal meals, negating the social hierarchies of Jewish culture and the Roman Empire.

Crossan is a major scholar in historical Jesus research. In particular, he and Burton Mack advocated for a non-eschatological view of Jesus, a view that contradicts the more common view that Jesus was an apocalyptic preacher.

== Life ==
Crossan was born on 17 February 1934, in Nenagh, County Tipperary, Ireland. Though his father was a banker, Crossan was steeped in rural Irish life, which he experienced through frequent visits to the home of his paternal grandparents. Upon graduation from St Eunan's College, a boarding high school, in 1950, Crossan joined the Servites, a Catholic religious order, and moved to the United States. He was trained at Stonebridge Seminary, Lake Bluff, Illinois, then ordained a priest in 1957.

Crossan returned to Ireland, where he earned his Doctor of Divinity degree in 1959 at St Patrick's College, Maynooth, the Irish national seminary. He then completed two more years of study in biblical languages at the Pontifical Biblical Institute in Rome. In 1965, while studying at the École Biblique in Jordanian East Jerusalem, he travelled through several countries in the region, escaping just days before the outbreak of the Six-Day War of 1967.

After a year at St. Mary of the Lake Seminary in Mundelein, Illinois, and a year at Catholic Theological Union in Chicago, Crossan chose to resign his priesthood. In the fall of 1969 he joined the faculty of DePaul University, where he taught undergraduates comparative religion for 26 years until retiring in 1995. With Robert W. Funk, Crossan served as cochair of the Jesus Seminar, a group of academics studying the historical Jesus, for its first decade. Crossan also served as president of the Chicago Society of Biblical Research in 1978–1979, and as president of the Society of Biblical Literature in 2012.

== Personal life ==
Crossan married Margaret Dagenais, a professor at Loyola University Chicago, in the summer of 1969. She died in 1983 due to a heart attack. In 1986, Crossan married Sarah Sexton, a social worker with two grown children. Since his retirement from academia, Crossan has continued to write and lecture.

== Views and methodology ==
Crossan portrays Jesus as a healer and wise man who taught a message of inclusiveness, tolerance, and liberation. In his view, Jesus' strategy "was the combination of free healing and common eating ... that negated the hierarchical and patronal normalcies of Jewish religion and Roman power ... He was neither broker nor mediator but ... the announcer that neither should exist between humanity and divinity or humanity and itself."

While contemporary scholars see more value in noncanonical gospels than past scholars did, Crossan goes further and identifies a few noncanonical gospels as earlier than and superior to the canonical ones. The very early dating of these non-canonical sources is not accepted by the majority of biblical scholars. Central to Crossan's methodology is the dating of texts. This is laid out more or less fully in The Historical Jesus in one of the appendices. He dates part of the Coptic Gospel of Thomas to the 50s AD, as well as the first layer of the hypothetical Q Document (in this he is heavily dependent on the work of John Kloppenborg). He also assigns a portion of the Gospel of Peter, which he calls the "Cross Gospel", to a date preceding the synoptic gospels, the reasoning of which is laid out more fully in The Cross that Spoke: The Origin of the Passion Narratives. He believes the "Cross Gospel" was the forerunner to the passion narratives in the canonical gospels. He does not date the synoptics until the mid to late 70s AD, starting with the Gospel of Mark and ending with Luke in the 90s. As for the Gospel of John, he believes part was constructed at the beginning, and another part closer to the middle, of the 2nd century AD. Following Rudolf Bultmann, he believes there is an earlier "Signs Gospel" source for John as well. His dating methods and conclusions are quite controversial, particularly regarding the dating of Thomas and the "Cross Gospel".

In God and Empire: Jesus Against Rome, Then and Now (2007), Crossan assumes that the reader is familiar with key points from his earlier work on the nonviolent revolutionary Jesus, his Kingdom movement, and the surrounding matrix of the Roman imperial theological system of religion, war, victory, peace, but discusses them in the broader context of the escalating violence in world politics and popular culture of today. Within that matrix, he points out, early in the book, that "(t)here was a human being in the first century who was called 'Divine,' 'Son of God,' 'God,' and 'God from God,' whose titles were 'Lord,' 'Redeemer,' 'Liberator,' and 'Saviour of the World.'" "(M)ost Christians probably think that those titles were originally created and uniquely applied to Christ. But before Jesus ever existed, all those terms belonged to Caesar Augustus." Crossan cites their adoption and application by the early Christians to Jesus as denying them to Caesar Augustus. "They were taking the identity of the Roman emperor and giving it to a Jewish peasant. Either that was a peculiar joke and a very low lampoon, or it was what the Romans called majestas and we call high treason."

In Who Killed Jesus (1995), he draws together a wide range of sources to demonstrate that the Jews not only did not crucify Jesus but that they were not consulted by Pontius Pilate. Further, they did not have a meeting on the eve of Passover (meetings were and are forbidden on that day). He then discusses why these tales appear in the Gospels.

In The Power of Parables: How Fiction by Jesus Became Fiction About Jesus, Crossan proposes a new interpretation of the biblical text: according to his thesis, the Gospels should be seen not as an actual biography, but as "megaparables", in the sense that the life of Jesus was shaped by his teachings, therefore creating some "megaparables", neither completely historical nor completely fictitious. At the end of the book, Crossan states "I conclude that Jesus really existed, that we can know the significant sequence of his life...but that he comes to us trailing clouds of fiction, parables by him and about him, particular incidents as miniparables and whole gospels as megaparables."

== Works ==
=== Books ===
- Crossan, John Dominic (1966). Scanning the Sunday Gospel. Milwaukee, WI: Bruce Publishing Company. OCLC 3098979.
- ——— (1967). The Gospel of Eternal Life: reflections on the theology of St. John. Milwaukee, WI: Bruce Publishing Company. OCLC 799467438.
- ——— (1973). In Parables: The Challenge of the Historical Jesus. New York: Harper & Row. ISBN 9780060616069. OCLC 693801.
- ——— (1975). The Dark Interval: Towards a Theology of Story. Niles, IL: Argus Communications. ISBN 9780913592526. OCLC 1959364.
- ——— (1976). Raid on the Articulate: Comic Eschatology in Jesus and Borges. New York: Harper & Row. ISBN 9780060616076. OCLC 2331585.
- ——— (1979). Finding Is the First Act: Trove Folktales and Jesus' Treasure Parable. Scholars Press. ISBN 9780685116531.
- ——— (1980). Cliffs of Fall: Paradox and Polyvalence in the Parables of Jesus. New York: Seabury Press. ISBN 9780816401130. OCLC 717736309.
- ——— (1981). A Fragile Craft: The Work of Amos Niven Wilder. Chico: Scholars Press. ISBN 9780891304241. OCLC 602969648.
- ——— (1983). In Fragments: The Aphorisms of Jesus. San Francisco & Cambridge: Harper & Row. ISBN 9780060616083. OCLC 715272028.
- ——— (1985). Four Other Gospels: Shadows on the Contours of Canon. Minneapolis: Winston Press. ISBN 9780866839594. OCLC 11829589.
- ——— (1985). Sayings Parallels: A Workbook for the Jesus Tradition. Polebridge Press. ISBN 9780944344194. OCLC 948579023.
- ——— (1988). The Cross that Spoke: The Origins of the Passion Narrative. San Francisco, CA: Harper & Row. ISBN 0-06-254843-3. OCLC 472804565.
- ——— (1991). The Historical Jesus: The Life of a Mediterranean Jewish Peasant. San Francisco, CA: HarperSanFrancisco. ISBN 0-06-061629-6. OCLC 23692728.
- ——— (1994). The Essential Jesus: Original Sayings and Earliest Images. San Francisco, CA: HarperSanFrancisco. ISBN 9780062510440. OCLC 29876817.
- ——— (1994). Jesus: A Revolutionary Biography. San Francisco, CA: HarperSanFrancisco. ISBN 9780060616618. OCLC 28180716.
- ——— (1995). Who Killed Jesus? Exposing the Roots of Anti-Semitism in the Gospel Story of the Death of Jesus. San Francisco, CA: HarperSanFrancisco. ISBN 9780060614799. OCLC 31409853.
- ———; Watts, Richard (1996). Who Is Jesus? Answers to Your Questions about the Historical Jesus. Louisville, KY: Westminster John Knox Press. ISBN 9780664258429. OCLC 981372236.
- ——— (1998). The Birth of Christianity: Discovering What Happened in the Years Immediately After the Execution of Jesus. San Francisco, CA: HarperSanFrancisco. ISBN 9780060616595. OCLC 37843686.
- ———; Craig, William Lane (1998). Copan, Paul (ed.). Will the Real Jesus Please Stand up?: A Debate between William Lane Craig and John Dominic Crossan. Grand Rapids, MI: Baker Books. ISBN 9780801021756. OCLC 39633978.
- ———; Johnson, Luke Timothy; Kelber, Werner H. (1999). The Jesus Controversy: Perspectives in Conflict. Rockwell Lecture Series. Harrisburg, PA: Trinity Press International. ISBN 9781563382895. OCLC 475079971.
- ——— (2000). A Long Way from Tipperary: A Memoir. San Francisco, CA: HarperSanFrancisco. ISBN 9780060699741. OCLC 473423727.
- ———; Allison, Dale C.; Borg, Marcus J.; Patterson, Stephen J. (2001). Miller, Robert J. (ed.). The Apocalyptic Jesus: A Debate. San Francisco, CA: HarperSanFrancisco. ISBN 978-0944344897. OCLC 52127660.
- ———; Reed, Jonathan L. (2001). Excavating Jesus: Beneath the Stones, Behind the Texts. San Francisco, CA: HarperSanFrancisco. ISBN 9780060616335. OCLC 46951948.
- ———; Reed, Jonathan L. (2004). In Search of Paul: How Jesus's Apostle Opposed Rome's Empire with God's Kingdom. San Francisco, CA: HarperSanFrancisco. ISBN 9780060514570. OCLC 56835410.
- ———; Borg, Marcus J. (2006). The Last Week: A Day-by-Day Account of Jesus's Final Week in Jerusalem. San Francisco, CA: HarperSanFrancisco. ISBN 978-0-06-084539-1. OCLC 62341611.
- ———; Borg, Marcus J. (2007). The First Christmas: What the Gospels Really Teach About Jesus' Birth. New York: Harper One. ISBN 9780061430701. OCLC 154686566.
- ——— (2007). God and Empire: Jesus Against Rome, Then and Now. San Francisco, CA: HarperSanFrancisco. ISBN 978-0-06-084323-6. OCLC 238826840.
- ———; Borg, Marcus J. (2009). The First Paul: Reclaiming the Radical Visionary Behind the Church's Conservative Icon. New York: HarperOne. ISBN 9780061430725. OCLC 232978219.
- ———; Price, Robert M.; Johnson, Luke Timothy; Dunn, James D.G.; Bock, Darrel L. (2009). Beilby, James K.; Copan, Paul R. (eds.). The Historical Jesus: Five Views. Spectrum Multiview Books. Downers Grove, IL: IVP Academic. ISBN 9780830838684.
- ——— (2010). The Greatest Prayer: Rediscovering the Revolutionary Message of The Lord's Prayer. New York: HarperOne. ISBN 978-0-06-187567-0. OCLC 813123177.
- ——— (2012). The Power of Parable: How Fiction "by Jesus" Became Fiction "About Jesus". New York: HarperOne. ISBN 9780061875694. OCLC 855993872.
- ——— (2015). How to Read the Bible and Still Be a Christian: Struggling with Divine Violence from Genesis Through Revelation. San Francisco, CA: HarperOne. ISBN 978-0-062-20359-5. OCLC 900332685.
- ———; Crossan, Sarah Sexton (2018). Resurrecting Easter: How the West Lost and the East Kept the Original Easter Vision. San Francisco, CA: HarperOne. ISBN 9780062434180. OCLC 1088599858.
- ——— (2022). Render unto Caesar: The Struggle over Christ and Culture in the New Testament. San Francisco, CA: HarperOne. ISBN 9780062964939.
- ——— (2024). Paul the Pharisee: A Vision Beyond the Violence of Civilization. Salem, OR: Polebridge Press of the Westar Institute (Home of the Jesus Seminar). ISBN 9781598150995.

Edited by

- ———; Collins, John J., eds. (1986). The Biblical Heritage in Modern Catholic Scholarship. In Honor of Bruce Vawter, C.M., on his 65th Birthday. Wilmington, DE: M. Glazier. ISBN 9780894535871. OCLC 492979404.
- ———, ed. (1991). Religious Worlds: Primary Readings in Comparative Perspective. Department of Religious Studies, DePaul University. Dubuque, IA: Kendall/Hunt. ISBN 9780840369505. OCLC 472827588.
- ———; Levine, Amy-Jill; Allison Jr., Dale C., eds. (2006). The Historical Jesus in Context. Princeton Readings in Religions. Princeton, NJ: Princeton University Press. ISBN 9781400827374. OCLC 1059012359.

=== Journal articles ===
- ——— (2004). "Crowd Control". The Christian Century. 121 (6): 18, 21–22.
- ——— (Summer 2005). "A Woman Equal to Paul: Who Is She?". Bible Review. 21 (3): 29–31, 46–47.
- ——— (2005). "New Testament and Roman Empire: Shifting Paradigms for Interpretation". Union Seminary Quarterly Review. 59 (3–4): 1–15.
- ———; Borg, Marcus (2007). "Jesus' Final Week: Collision Course". The Christian Century. 124 (6): 27–31.
- ——— (2007). "The Message of the Historical Jesus and Contemporary American Imperialism". Rivista di Teologia dell'Evangelizzazione. 11: 395–406.
- ——— (2013). "A Vision of Divine Justice: The Resurrection of Jesus in Eastern Christian Iconography". Journal of Biblical Literature. 132: 1–32.
