= Gerd Lüdemann =

New Testament scholar and historian of early Christianity (1946–2021)

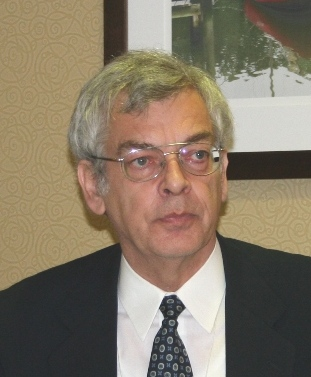
- Lüdemann in San Diego, November 2007
- Born: July 5, 1946
- Died: May 23, 2021 (aged 74)
- Occupations: New Testament scholar and historian

Gerd Lüdemann (July 5, 1946 – May 23, 2021) was a German biblical scholar and historian. He taught first Jewish Christianity and Gnosticism at McMaster University, Canada (1977–1979) and then New Testament at Vanderbilt Divinity School, U.S.A. (1979–1982).

In 1983, Lüdemann was appointed to the chair in New Testament Studies in the Evangelical Theological Faculty at the University of Göttingen (Georg-August-Universität Göttingen), Germany, and taught New Testament until 1999. In the same year, his chair in "New Testament" was renamed "History and Literature of Early Christianity" in the Institute for Special Research (Institut für Spezialforschungen) at the university. Thus, he was removed from the professorship to train future Protestant pastors and stayed in the new department until his retirement in 2011.

== Early life and education ==
Gerd Lüdemann was born on July 5, 1946, in Visselhövede, a town in the district of Rotenburg an der Wümme in Lower Saxony, Germany. His parents were not poor but they lived modestly; his mother was religious and a devout churchgoer. Lüdemann was a born again Christian by conversion at a “tent mission” of his home town, Visselhövede, in May 1963, but eventually he lost his faith.

After high school, he enrolled in the University of Göttingen (1966–1971) and passed the first exam of theology. In the graduate study of the University (1971–1974), he completed his doctoral (D. theol.) dissertation, Untersuchungen zur simonianischen Gnosis / Investigations into Simonian Gnosis (Göttingen 1974). He spent the academic year 1974–1975 in the United States as a post-doctoral fellow at Duke University, U.S.A., under Professor W.D. Davies. After returning to the University of Göttingen in 1975, while he served as academic assistant of New Testament to Georg Strecker (1975–1977), his Habilitation thesis, Paulus, der Heidenapostel Band I. Studien zur Chronologie, was accepted (D. habil.) by the University of Göttingen in 1977.

== Career ==
Academic assistant of New Testament to Georg Strecker (1975–1977) was the first academic career of Lüdemann. He concurrently (1976–1977) taught, as lecturer, at the Volkshochschule (adult public school), Göttingen, which sponsors public seminars held by university professors. After the habilitation work (1977), he went to North America again: At first he taught Jewish Christianity and Gnosticism at McMaster University Department of Religion, Canada, as visiting assistant professor (1977–1979), and then he moved to Vanderbilt Divinity School, Nashville, Tennessee, U.S.A., to teach New Testament as assistant professor (1979) and then as associate professor (1980).

Lüdemann was awarded Heisenberg-Scholarship of the Deutsche Forschungsgemeinschaft (1980–1983), and the scholarship enabled him free intensive research without teaching obligation. In 1983, as the successor to Ulrich Luz, Lüdemann was appointed to the head of New Testament in the Evangelical Theological Faculty at the University of Göttingen. In 1999, he was reassigned to the Early Christian Studies Department of the Institute for Special Research (Institut für Spezialforschungen) at the University and taught “History and Literature of Early Christianity” until his retirement in 2011.

== Theological and historical views ==
In 1999, Lüdemann published Der große Betrug: Und was Jesus wirklich sagte und tat (The Great Deception: And What Jesus Really Said and Did), in which he claimed that only about five per cent of the sayings attributed to Jesus are genuine and the historical evidence does not support the arguments of traditional Christianity. Even though Lüdemann explicitly rejected the mission of the school which was the "preparation of the students seeking to become ministers of the Church", Lüdemann refused to step down even though he did not acknowledge or support the department's mission. As Lüdemann put it, "the person of Jesus himself becomes insufficient as a foundation of faith once most of the New Testament statements about him have proved to be later interpretations by the community".

The Confederation of Protestant Churches in Lower Saxony called for his dismissal from the Chair of New Testament Studies, because he did not agree with their mission. His dismissal was rejected by the state government of Lower Saxony and as a result a search for a new Chair of New Testament Studies was instituted, and Lüdemann was retained and appointed Chair of History and Literature of Early Christianity. All his courses were thereafter "explicitly identified as 'outside of the programs of study required for the training of future ministers of the Church'." Lüdemann complained and wrote the article "The Decline of Academic Theology at Göttingen" where he put the school on blast, complaining that "most of my colleagues have long since left the principles of the Church behind them yet still seek to attach themselves to this tradition by symbolic interpretation and by other interpretative skills".

== Later life ==
Being a member of the Jesus Seminar, he debated William Lane Craig in 1997 and in 2002 over Jesus' resurrection. Since 2011, after his retirement from the University of Göttingen, Lüdemann was visiting scholar at Vanderbilt University Divinity School, Nashville, Tennessee, as a resident alien of the United States. He died on May 23, 2021, after five years of serious illness.

== Selected works in English ==
For German versions and other publications, see the external link below to Library of Congress.

- Lüdemann, Gerd (1994). The Resurrection of Jesus: History, Experience, Theology. Minneapolis: Fortress Press. ISBN 0-8006-2792-X.
- ——————— (1995). What Really Happened to Jesus: A Historical Approach to the Resurrection. Louisville, Kentucky: Westminster John Knox Press. ISBN 0-664-25647-3.
- ——————— (1997). The Unholy in Holy Scripture: The Dark Side of the Bible. Louisville, Kentucky: Westminster John Knox Press. ISBN 0-664-25739-9. (German original published in 1996)
- ——————— (1999). The Great Deception: And What Jesus Really Said and Did. Amherst, New York: Prometheus Books. ISBN 1-57392-688-4. (German original published in 1998)
- ——————— (2002). Paul: The Founder of Christianity. Amherst, New York: Prometheus Books. ISBN 1-59102-021-2.
