= Jesus Seminar =

American biblical research project

- Formation: 1985; 41 years ago
- Founder: Robert Funk
- Dissolved: 2006; 20 years ago
- Purpose: To decide their collective view of the historicity of the deeds and sayings of Jesus of Nazareth
- Methods: Votes with colored beads
- Members: 150
- Parent organization: Westar Institute

The Jesus Seminar was a group of about 50 biblical criticism scholars and 100 laymen founded in 1985 by Robert Funk that originated under the auspices of the Westar Institute. The seminar was very active through the 1980s and 1990s, and into the early 21st century.

Members of the Seminar used votes with colored beads to decide their collective view of the historicity of the deeds and sayings of Jesus of Nazareth. They produced new translations of the New Testament and apocrypha to use as textual sources. They published their results in three reports: The Five Gospels (1993), The Acts of Jesus (1998), and The Gospel of Jesus (1999). They also ran a series of lectures and workshops in various U.S. cities.

The work of The Jesus Seminar continued after the death of its founder (2005) and was succeeded by two seminars: The Seminar on God and the Human Future and The Christianity Seminar. The latter published its first report in 2022, After Jesus Before Christianity: A Historical Exploration of the First Two Centuries of Jesus Movements. The seminars are the scholarly program units of Westar Institute. Westar publishes a bi-monthly magazine for the general public, The Fourth R: An Advocate for Religious Literacy.

The Jesus Seminar has come under intense criticism regarding its method, assumptions and conclusions from a wide array of scholars and laymen.

== Search for the "historical Jesus" ==
The Seminar's reconstruction of the historical Jesus portrayed him as an itinerant Hellenistic Jewish sage and faith-healer who preached a gospel of liberation from injustice in startling parables and aphorisms. An iconoclast, Jesus broke with established Jewish theological dogmas and social conventions both in his teachings and in his behavior, often by turning common-sense ideas upside down, confounding the expectations of his audience: he preached of "Heaven's imperial rule" (traditionally translated as "Kingdom of God") as being already present but unseen; he depicted God as a loving father; he fraternized with outsiders and criticized insiders. According to the Seminar, Jesus was a mortal man born of two human parents, who did not perform nature miracles nor die as a substitute for sinners nor rise bodily from the dead. Sightings of a risen Jesus represented the visionary experiences of some of his disciples rather than physical encounters. While these claims, not accepted by conservative Christian laity, have been repeatedly made in various forms since the 18th century, the Jesus Seminar addressed them in a unique manner with its consensual research methodology.

The Seminar treated the canonical gospels as historical sources that represent Jesus' actual words and deeds as well as elaborations of the early Christian community and of the gospel authors. The Fellows placed the burden of proof on those who advocate any passage's historicity. Unconcerned with canonical boundaries, they asserted that the Gospel of Thomas may have more authentic material than the Gospel of John.

The Seminar held a number of premises or "scholarly wisdom" about Jesus when critically approaching the gospels. Members acted on the premise that Jesus did not hold an apocalyptic worldview, an opinion that is controversial in mainstream scholarly studies of Jesus. The Fellows argued that the authentic words of Jesus, rather than revealing an apocalyptic eschatology which instructs his disciples to prepare for the end of the world, indicate that he preached a sapiential eschatology, which encourages all of God's children to repair the world.

The methods and conclusions of the Jesus Seminar have come under harsh criticism from numerous biblical scholars, historians and clergy for a variety of reasons. Such critics assert, for example, that the Fellows of the Seminar were not all trained scholars, that their voting technique did not allow for nuance, that they were preoccupied with the Q source and with the Gospel of Thomas but omitted material in other sources such as the Gospel of the Hebrews, and that they relied excessively on the criterion of embarrassment.

== Use of historical methods ==
The scholars attending sought to reconstruct the life of the historical Jesus. Using a number of tools, they asked who he was, what he did, what he said, and what his sayings meant. Their reconstructions depended on social anthropology, history and textual analysis. The key feature was the rejection of apocalyptic eschatology. They used cross-cultural anthropological studies to set the general background, narrow in on the history and society of first-century Palestine, and used textual analysis (along with more anthropology and history) to focus on Jesus himself. They used a combination of primary sources, secondary sources, and archaeological evidence. Their methodology, as developed by a team of scholars (who expounded papers for the review of other Fellows and published many in Forum) and as explained in the book The Five Gospels (the four canonical gospels plus the Gospel of Thomas), involved canvassing the records of the first four centuries for traditions about Jesus and sifting them by criteria such as multiple attestation, distinctiveness, and orality.

=== "Seven pillars of scholarly wisdom" ===
The Five Gospels lists seven bases for the modern critical scholarship of Jesus, claiming these "pillars" have developed since the end of the 18th century:

1. Distinguishing between the historical Jesus and the stories that the gospels tell about him. Hermann Samuel Reimarus (1694–1768) started the quest for the historical Jesus and David Friedrich Strauss established it as part of biblical criticism with his book Life of Jesus Critically Examined (1835).
2. Distinguishing between the Synoptics and John. Since the 1800s, Bible scholars have distinguished between the Jesus of the Synoptic gospels (Mark, Matthew, and Luke) and the Jesus in John, generally favoring the synoptics as more historical and seeing John as more spiritual.
3. Identifying Mark as the first gospel. By 1900, critical scholars had largely concluded that Mark came before Matthew and Luke and served as a source for each.
4. Identifying the hypothetical Q document. By 1900, scholars had hypothesized this lost collection of Jesus' sayings, thought to be the source of material found in Matthew and Luke but not in Mark.
5. Questioning eschatological (apocalyptic) Jesus. In 1906, Albert Schweitzer portrayed Jesus as a failed apocalyptic prophet, and this analysis virtually put an end to historical inquiry into Jesus. In the 1970s and 1980s, however, critical historians returned to the topic of historical Jesus. Some of these scholars identified the apocalyptic imagery in the gospels as originating with John the Baptist, and not authentic to Jesus.
6. Distinguishing between oral and print cultures. Since Jesus lived and preached in an oral culture, scholars expect that short, memorable stories or phrases are more likely to be historical.
7. Reversing the burden of proof. In his day, Strauss had to offer evidence to question the historicity of any part of the gospels because his audience assumed that the gospels were historical. Today, the assumption is nearly the opposite, with the gospels understood to be so thoroughly embellished that one needs evidence to suppose that anything in them is historical.

==== Noneschatological Jesus ====
The Five Gospels says that the non-apocalyptic view of the historical Jesus gained ground in the 1970s and 1980s when research into Jesus shifted out of religious environments and into secular academia. Marcus Borg says that "the old consensus that Jesus was an eschatological prophet who proclaimed the imminent end of the world has disappeared", and identifies two reasons for this change:

1. Since the 1960s, some scholars have started to view the gospel references to the coming Son of Man as insertions by the early Christian community.
2. Some scholars have begun to see Jesus' kingdom of God as a present reality, a "realized eschatology", rather than an imminent end of the world (cf. Luke 17:20–21).

The apocalyptic elements attributed to Jesus, according to The Five Gospels, come from John the Baptist and the early Christian community (p. 4).

Scholars involved in the third and next quests for the historical Jesus have constructed a variety of portraits and profiles for Jesus. However, there is little scholarly agreement on the portraits, or the methods used in constructing them. But according to Theissen and Merz, writing in 1996, while the noneschatological Jesus is a significant trend in contemporary research into the historical Jesus, most scholars affirm the traditional view that Jesus prophesied the imminent end of the world. Since the 1990s, however, other scholars have pointed out the complexity of apocalypticism within Second Temple Judaism, and grant that Jesus did make "apocalyptic" predictions, but in relation to the destruction of the Jewish Temple in 70 AD, and not the end of the world.

== The scholars' translation ==
The Seminar began by translating the gospels into modern American English, producing what they call the "Scholars Version", first published in The Complete Gospels. This translation uses modern colloquialisms and phrasing in an effort to provide a contemporary sense of the gospel authors' styles, if not their literal words. The goal was to let the reader hear the message as a first-century listener might have. The translators avoided other translations' archaic, literal translation of the text, or a superficial update of it. For example, they translate "woe to you" as "damn you". The authors of The Complete Gospels argue that some other gospel translations have attempted to unify the language of the gospels, while they themselves have tried to preserve each author's distinct voice.

== Methodology ==
The first findings of the Jesus Seminar were published in 1993 as The Five Gospels: The Search for the Authentic Words of Jesus.

The Fellows used a voting system to evaluate the authenticity of about 500 statements and events. For certain high-profile passages, the votes were embodied in beads, the color of which represented the degree of confidence that a saying or act was or was not authentic:

- Red beads – indicated the voter believed Jesus did say the passage quoted, or something very much like the passage. (3 Points)
- Pink beads – indicated the voter believed Jesus probably said something like the passage. (2 Points)
- Grey beads – indicated the voter believed Jesus did not say the passage, but it contains Jesus' ideas. (1 Point)
- Black beads – indicated the voter believed Jesus did not say the passage—it comes from later admirers or a different tradition. (0 Points)

A confidence value was determined from the voting using a weighted average of the points given for each bead; the text was color-coded from red to black (with the same significance as the bead colors) according to the outcome of the voting.

=== Criteria for authenticity ===
The Jesus Seminar treats the gospels as fallible historical artifacts, containing both authentic and inauthentic material. The Seminar fellows used several criteria for determining whether a particular saying or story is authentic, including the criteria of multiple attestation and embarrassment. Among additional criteria used by the fellows are the following:

- Orality: According to the latest estimates, the gospels were not written until decades after Jesus' death. Parables, aphorisms, and stories were passed down orally (30–50 CE). The fellows judged whether a saying was a short, catchy pericope that could possibly survive intact from the speaker's death until decades later when it was first written down. If so, it is more likely to be authentic. For example, "turn the other cheek".
- Irony: Based on several important narrative parables (such as the Parable of the Good Samaritan), the fellows decided that irony, reversal, and frustration of expectations were characteristic of Jesus' style. If a pericope presents opposites or impossibilities, it is more likely to be authentic. For example, "love your enemies".
- Trust in God: A long discourse attested in three gospels has Jesus telling his listeners not to fret but to trust in the Father. Fellows looked for this theme in other sayings they deemed authentic. For example, "Ask – it'll be given to you".

=== Criteria for inauthenticity ===
The Seminar looked for several characteristics that, in their judgment, identified a saying as inauthentic, including self-reference, leadership issues, and apocalyptic themes.

- Self-reference: Does the text have Jesus referring to himself? For example: "I am the way, and I am the truth, and I am life" (John 14:1–14)
- Framing material: Are the verses used to introduce, explain, or frame other material, which might itself be authentic? For example, in Luke, the "red" parable of the good samaritan is framed by scenes about Jesus telling the parable, and the seminar deemed Jesus' framing words in these scenes to be "black".
- Community issues: Do the verses refer to the concerns of the early Christian community, such as instructions for missionaries or issues of leadership? For example, Peter as "the rock" on which Jesus builds his church (Matthew 16:17–19).
- Theological agenda: Do the verses support an opinion or outlook that is unique to the gospel, possibly indicating redactor bias? For example, the prophecy of the sheep and the goats (Matthew 25:31–46) received the color black because the fellows saw it as representing Matthew's agenda of speaking out against unworthy members of the Christian community.

=== Example: the beatitudes ===
The Jesus Seminar rated various beatitudes as red, pink, gray, and black. Three beatitudes are judged to be "paradoxical" and are doubly attested. They are rated red (authentic) as they appear in Luke 6:20–21.

- "Congratulations, you poor! God's domain belongs to you".
- "Congratulations, you hungry! You will have a feast".
- "Congratulations, you who weep now! You will laugh".

The Seminar fellows decided that the beatitude for those persecuted in Jesus' name might trace back to Jesus as a beatitude for those who suffer, but concluded that, in its final form, the saying represents concerns of the Christian community rather than Jesus' message. Thus, it received a gray rating.

Matthew's version of the three authentic beatitudes were rated pink. The author has spiritualized two of them, so that they now refer to the poor "in spirit" and to those who hunger "and thirst for justice". Matthew also includes beatitudes for the meek, the merciful, the pure of heart, and peace-makers. These beatitudes have no second attestation, lack irony, and received a black rating.

== Principal publications ==
The Jesus Seminar produced a significant number of publications both in the form of journal articles and books published for the general public. Individual members of the seminar also produced, and continue to produce books which draw heavily upon the Seminar's work. The following is a selected sampling of those publications; a complete list of Jesus Seminar publications may be found at the Polebridge Press website, the in-house publisher for the Westar Institute:

- Borg, Marcus J.; Meeting Jesus Again for the First Time: The Historical Jesus and the Heart of Contemporary Faith; HarperOne Imprints, HarperCollins; New York, New York: 1995. 978-0060609177
- Crossan, John Dominic; Jesus: A Revolutionary Biography; HarperOne Imprints, HarperCollins; New York, New York: 2009. 978-0061800351
- Funk, Robert Walter; Butts, James R.; Scott, Bernard Brandon; The Parables of Jesus (Jesus Seminar Series); Polebridge Press; Salem, Oregon: 1988. 978-0944344071
- Funk, Robert Walter; et al.; The Five Gospels: What Did Jesus Really Say? The Search for the Authentic Words of Jesus; HarperOne Imprints, HarperCollins; New York, New York: 1996. 978-0060630409
- Funk, Robert Walter; et al.; The Acts of Jesus: What Did Jesus Really Do? ; Polebridge Press; Salem, Oregon: 1998. 978-0060629786
- Funk, Robert Walter; et al.; The Gospel of Jesus: According to the Jesus Seminar; Polebridge Press; Salem, Oregon: 1999. 978-0944344743
- Miller, Robert J.; et al.; The Jesus Seminar and Its Critics; Polebridge Press; Salem, Oregon: 1999. 978-0944344781
- Miller, Robert J.; The Complete Gospels; Polebridge Press; Salem, Oregon: 2010. 978-1598150186
- Tatum, W. Barnes; John the Baptist and Jesus: A Report of the Jesus Seminar; Polebridge Press; Salem, Oregon: 1994. 978-0944344422

=== Acts of Jesus ===
In 1998 the Jesus Seminar published The Acts of Jesus: The Search for the Authentic Deeds of Jesus. To create the material for this book, they voted on the individual acts of Jesus as recorded in the gospels, much as they had previously voted on the individual sayings attributed to him.

According to the Jesus Seminar:

- Jesus of Nazareth was born during the reign of Herod the Great.
- His mother's name was Mary, and he had a human father whose name may not have been Joseph.
- Jesus was born in Nazareth, not in Bethlehem.
- Jesus was an itinerant sage who shared meals with social outcasts.
- Jesus practiced faith healing without the use of ancient medicine or magic, relieving afflictions now modernly considered psychosomatic.
- He did not walk on water, feed the multitude with loaves and fishes, change water into wine or raise Lazarus from the dead.
- Jesus was arrested in Jerusalem and crucified by the Romans.
- He was executed as a public nuisance, not for claiming to be the Son of God.
- The empty tomb is a fiction – Jesus was not raised bodily from the dead.
- Belief in the resurrection is based on the visionary experiences of Paul, Peter and Mary Magdalene.

== Criticism from scholars ==
The Jesus Seminar has come under intense criticism regarding its method, assumptions and conclusions from a wide array of scholars and laymen. Scholars who have expressed concerns with the work of the Jesus Seminar include Richard Hays, Ben Witherington, Greg Boyd, N.T. Wright, William Lane Craig, Luke Timothy Johnson, Craig A. Evans, Paul Barnett, Michael F. Bird, Craig Blomberg, Markus Bockmuehl, Raymond Brown, James D.G. Dunn, Howard Clark Kee, John P. Meier, Graham Stanton, Darrell Bock, and Edwin Yamauchi.

Jesuit theologian Gerald O'Collins has been critical of the methods and conclusions of the Jesus Seminar, with particular attention to Christological ramifications.

Lutheran theologian Carl Braaten has been sharply critical, saying: "The Jesus Seminar is the latest example of a pseudo-scientific approach that is 'dogmatically' opposed to basic Christian dogmas, popularizing in the public mind Harnack's view that an unbridgeable gulf exists between Jesus and the church".

=== Composition of the Seminar and qualifications of the members ===
Luke Timothy Johnson, a historian of the origins of Christianity, argued that while some members of the seminar are reputable scholars (Borg, Crossan, Funk, others), others are relatively unknown or undistinguished in the field of biblical studies. One member, Paul Verhoeven, holds no Ph.D. but a M.Sc. in mathematics and physics, not biblical studies, and is best known as a film director. Johnson also critiqued the seminar for its attempts to gain the attention of the media with the 2000 ABC News program The Search for Jesus, hosted by news anchor Peter Jennings.

Seminar critic William Lane Craig has argued that the self-selected members of the group do not represent the consensus of New Testament scholars. He writes:

Of the 74 [scholars] listed in their publication The Five Gospels, only 14 would be leading figures in the field of New Testament studies. More than half are basically unknowns, who have published only two or three articles. Eighteen of the fellows have published nothing at all in New Testament studies. Most have relatively undistinguished academic positions, for example, teaching at a community college.

Others have made the same point and have further indicated that thirty-six of those scholars, almost half, have a degree from or currently teach at one of three schools: Harvard, Claremont, or Vanderbilt University, all of which are considered to favor "liberal" interpretations of the New Testament. To open theist Greg Boyd, a prominent evangelical pastor and theologian, "The Jesus Seminar represents an extremely small number of radical-fringe scholars who are on the far, far left wing of New Testament thinking. It does not represent mainstream scholarship." New Testament scholar Mark Allan Powell has stated: "The Jesus Seminar is not representative of the guild of New Testament historical scholarship today. Rather, it is representative of one voice within that guild, a voice that actually espouses a minority position on some key issues".

In the first chapter of his 2010 book Jesus of Nazareth: An Independent Historian's Account of his Life and Teaching, Maurice Casey, an irreligious British scholar of the New Testament, criticizes the Seminar for having not included "some of the best scholars in the USA, such as E. P. Sanders, J. A. Fitzmyer, and Dale Allison". He states that these glaring omissions were compounded by the fact that many of the supposed "experts" at the Seminar were young, obscure scholars who had only just completed their doctorates.

=== Flawed voting system ===
The voting system has been criticized by, among others, N. T. Wright, who said: "I cannot understand how, if a majority ... thought a saying authentic or probably authentic, the 'weighted average' turned out to be 'probably inauthentic'. A voting system that produces a result like this ought to be scrapped". Casey sums up the voting process, stating: "In practice, this meant an averaged majority vote by people who were not in any reasonable sense authorities at all".

=== Influence of presuppositions ===
Howard Clark Kee, Professor of Biblical Studies Emeritus at Boston University School of Theology, writing in the journal Theology Today stated that "the conclusions reached by these scholars are inherent in the presuppositions and methods they have chosen to adopt from the outset".

Luke Timothy Johnson of the Candler School of Theology at Emory University, in his 1996 book The Real Jesus, voiced concerns with the seminar's work. He criticized the techniques of the Seminar, believing them to be far more limited for historical reconstruction than seminar members believe. Their conclusions were "already determined ahead of time", Johnson says, which "is not responsible, or even critical scholarship. It is a self-indulgent charade". William Lane Craig argues that the principal presuppositions of scientific naturalism, the primacy of the apocryphal gospels, and the necessity of a politically correct Jesus are unjustified and issue in a distorted portrait of the historical Jesus.

Raymond Brown likewise avers that the Seminar "operated to a remarkable degree on a priori principles, some of them reflecting antisupernatural bias. For instance, the bodily resurrection had no real chance of being accepted as having taken place. ... Again, almost as a principle, the eschatological character of Jesus' ministry has been dismissed..."

Dale Allison of Pittsburgh Theological Seminary, in his 1998 book Jesus of Nazareth: Millenarian Prophet, cited what he felt were problems with the work of (particularly) John Dominic Crossan and Marcus Borg, arguing that their conclusions were at least in part predetermined by their theological positions. He also pointed out the limitations of their presumptions and methodology. Allison argued that despite the conclusions of the seminar, Jesus was a prophetic figure focused to a large extent on apocalyptic thinking. Several Bible scholars (for example Bart D. Ehrman, an agnostic, and Paula Fredriksen, a Jew) have reasserted Albert Schweitzer's eschatological view of Jesus. Casey argues that the Jesus Seminar's fundamental social goal was not to construct an accurate portrait of the historical Jesus, but rather to create "a figure whom [the Fellows of the Seminar] are happy with". In particular, the fellows of the Seminar have removed "the apocalyptic and eschatological concerns which characterize American fundamentalism" and remade Jesus as "a cynic philosopher, which suits their intellectual ambiance".

=== Inappropriate emphasis on flawed criteria ===
Numerous scholars have criticized the Seminar for placing too much value on the criterion of dissimilarity. For the Seminar, a saying will only be held as authentic if it does not match the beliefs of Judaism or those held by the early Christians. Critics such as Gregory Boyd have noted that the effect of this is that the Jesus of the Seminar shows no continuity with his Jewish context nor his disciples. Raymond Brown has stated that "a rigorous application of such criteria would leave us with a monstrosity: a Jesus who never said, thought, or did anything that other Jews said, thought, or did, and a Jesus who had no connection or relationship to what his followers said, thought, or did in reference to him after he died". J. Ed Komoszewski and co-authors state that the Jesus Seminar's "Criteria for In/Authenticity" creates "an eccentric Jesus who learned nothing from his own culture and made no impact on his followers". The same criticism has been made by Craig Evans.

=== Bias against canonical sources and for non-canonical sources ===
Casey criticizes the Seminar for the "exaggerated importance which they have attributed to the Gospel of Thomas", stating: "Their voting was so bizarre that they ended up with more red in the Gospel than in our oldest genuine source, the Gospel of Mark." Craig Blomberg notes that if the Jesus Seminar's findings are to be believed, then:

[I]t requires the assumption that someone, about a generation removed from the events in question, radically transformed the authentic information about Jesus that was circulating at that time, superimposed a body of material four times as large, fabricated almost entirely out of whole cloth, while the church suffered sufficient collective amnesia to accept the transformation as legitimate.

Craig Evans argues that the Jesus Seminar applies a form of hypercriticism to the canonical gospels that unreasonably assumes that "Jesus' contemporaries (that is, the first generation of his movement) were either incapable of remembering or uninterested in recalling accurately what Jesus said and did, and in passing it on" while, in contrast, privileging extra-canonical texts with an uncritical acceptance that sometimes rises to the level of special pleading. Howard Clark Kee, writing in The Cambridge Companion to the Bible (1997) and citing Helmut Koester and John Dominic Crossan as examples, stated:

Some scholars have advanced the theory that these so-called apocryphal gospels actually include texts and traditions that are older and more reliable than those in the canonical New Testament writings. ... These opinions are purely circular arguments, since the investigators have found material which they prefer to what is the canonical Gospels and, in support of their preferences, attribute this material to more ancient sources. No ancient evidence confirms these theories, but the theories have been welcomed and widely publicized in the popular press.

=== Other ===
Garry Wills, a vocal proponent of liberal Catholicism, nonetheless strongly critiques the Seminar:

This is the new fundamentalism. It believes in the literal sense of the Bible—it just reduces to what it can take as literal quotation from Jesus. Though some have called the Jesus Seminarists radical, they are actually very conservative. They tame the real, radical, Jesus, cutting him down to their own size...the sayings that meet with the Seminar's approval were preserved by the Christian communities whose contribution is discounted. Jesus as a person does not exist outside of the gospels, and the only reason he exists there is because of their authors' faith in the Resurrection. Trying to find a construct, "the historical Jesus", is not like finding diamonds in a dunghill, but like finding New York City at the bottom of the Pacific Ocean.

== Evangelical backlash ==
In addition to scholarly critiques, a number of Evangelical Christian organizations were critical of the Jesus Seminar.

D. James Kennedy, senior pastor of Coral Ridge Presbyterian Church, was critical of the Jesus Seminar and John Dominic Crossan, writing in his 1996 book The Gates of Hell Shall Not Prevail:

Doesn't it seem like its open season on Christians—and even Christ—these days? The character of the only perfect human being to ever live is being dragged through the mud by those with the respectability of a degree behind their names ... While there are liberal Bible scholars who deny some or many tenets of the faith, there are just as many—if not more—scholars who hold to a much more conservative position.

In response to the airing of a two-hour ABC News documentary titled The Search for Jesus in June 2000, which featured Jesus Seminar scholars including Marcus Borg and John Dominic Crossan, Coral Ridge Ministries produced the one-hour documentary "Who Is This Jesus". Hosted by actor Dean Jones and D. James Kennedy, the film features ancient history scholar Paul L. Maier, and biblical scholars D.A. Carson, N.T. Wright, Gary Habermas, and Bruce Metzger. Also featured is evangelical apologist Josh McDowell. As Kennedy recalled later: "We featured a wide variety of scholarly viewpoints... We set out to show the ample historical evidence that the Gospels are reliable, that the New Testament is the best-attested book in antiquity in quantity and quality of manuscripts, that Jesus is who He said He is, and that He rose from the dead". The film aired on Christmas Day 2000 on the PAX-TV network and a number of CBS affiliates. An expanded version of the film, titled Who Is This Jesus: Is He Risen?, aired at Easter 2001. The film aired again on The Coral Ridge Hour on Palm Sunday, 2005.

Similarly, in 2001 John Ankerberg, a Baptist apologist-theologian, host of The John Ankerberg Show, responded with The Search for Jesus: A Response to the ABC, NBC, CNN Specials about Jesus. The program featured biblical scholars Craig Blomberg, Gary Habermas, and N.T. Wright as well as philosopher-theologian William Lane Craig and Israeli archaeologist Gabriel Barkay.

Both The Watchman Expositor and The Christian Arsenal identify the Jesus Seminar as an attempt by Satan to twist the meaning of Scripture, founded in the liberalism, modernism, and neo-orthodoxy in academia and mainline seminaries. Maurice Casey states:

The effect of the American Jesus Seminar on conservative American Christians has been just as disastrous as the work of the Seminar itself. Some of them write books which appear to assume that, if they can demonstrate that the Jesus Seminar is wrong, they thereby demonstrate the absolute truth of Protestant fundamentalism or Catholic orthodoxy, whichever the perspective from which the author is writing.

== Current activities and fellows of the Jesus Seminar ==
Members of the Jesus Seminar have responded to their critics in various books and dialogues, which typically defend both their methodology and their conclusions. Among these responses are The Jesus Seminar and Its Critics by Robert J. Miller, a member of the Seminar; The Apocalyptic Jesus: A Debate, a dialogue with Allison, Borg, Crossan, and Stephen Patterson; The Jesus Controversy: Perspectives in Conflict, a dialogue between Crossan, Johnson, and Werner H. Kelber. The Meaning of Jesus: Two Visions, by Borg and noted New Testament historian and Pauline scholar N. T. Wright demonstrated how two scholars with divergent theological positions can work together to creatively share and discuss their thoughts.

The Jesus seminar was active in the 1980s and 1990s. Early in the 21st century, another group called the "Acts Seminar" was formed by some previous members to follow similar approaches to biblical research.

In March 2006, the Jesus Seminar began work on a new description of the emergence of the Jesus traditions through the first two centuries of the common era (CE). In this new phase, fellows of the Jesus Seminar on Christian Origins employ the methods and techniques pioneered by the original Jesus Seminar.

Robert Funk died in 2005, Marcus Borg in 2015, Stephen L. Harris in 2019, and Burton Mack in 2022, but notable surviving fellows of the Jesus Seminar include John Dominic Crossan and Robert M. Price. Borg was a liberal Christian who articulated the vision hypothesis to explain Jesus' resurrection. Some view Crossan as an important voice in contemporary historical Jesus research, promoting the idea of a non-apocalyptic Jesus who preaches a sapiential eschatology. Funk was a well-known scholar of recent American research into Jesus' parables. Harris was the author of several books on religion, including university-level textbooks. Mack described Jesus as a Galilean Cynic, based on the elements of the Q document that he considers to be earliest.

== See also ==
- Christ myth theory
- Historical background of the New Testament
- Historicity of Jesus
- Jesusism
- Liberal Christianity
- Liberal religion
- Quest for the historical Jesus
- Two-source hypothesis
- Category:Members of the Jesus Seminar
