= Robert W. Funk =

American theologian and Biblical scholar (1926–2005)

Robert Walter Funk (July 18, 1926 – September 3, 2005) was an American biblical scholar, founder of the Jesus Seminar and the nonprofit Westar Institute in Santa Rosa, California. Funk sought to promote research and education on what he called biblical literacy. His approach to hermeneutics was historical-critical, with a strongly skeptical view of orthodox Christian belief, particularly concerning the historical Jesus. He and his associates described Jesus' parables as containing shocking messages that contradicted established religious attitudes.

== Career ==
Funk had a Bachelor of Divinity and Master's degree from Butler University and its affiliated Christian Theological Seminary in 1950 and 1951, a PhD in 1953 from Vanderbilt University and was a Guggenheim Fellow and a Senior Fulbright Scholar.

He taught at the American School of Oriental Research in Jerusalem, was chairman of the graduate department of religion at Vanderbilt University and executive secretary of the Society of Biblical Literature. He was founder and first executive director of Scholars Press (1974–1980).

== Works ==
=== Books ===
- Funk, Robert W. (1961). A Greek Grammar of the New Testament and Other Early Christian Literature: A Translation and Revision of the ninth-tenth German edition incorporating supplementary notes of A. Debrunner. Chicago, IL: University of Chicago Press. ISBN 9780226271101. OCLC 747562. - translator and revisor
- ——— (1966). Language, Hermeneutic and Word of God: the problem of language in the New Testament and contemporary theology. New York: Harper & Row. OCLC 384346.
- ——— (1973). A Beginning-Intermediate Grammar of Hellenistic Greek. Sources for Biblical Study. Vol. 2. Missoula, MT: Society of Biblical Literature. ISBN 9780733604782. OCLC 619856519.
- ——— (1975). Jesus as Precursor. Semeia Supplements. Vol. 2. Philadelphia, PA: Fortress Press. ISBN 9780800615024. OCLC 1993001.
- ——— (1982). Parables and Presence: forms of the New Testament tradition. Philadelphia, PA: Fortress Press. ISBN 9780800606886. OCLC 8628426.
- ——— (1985). New Gospel Parallels. Foundations and Facets. Philadelphia, PA: Fortress Press. ISBN 9780800621049. OCLC 11915771.
- ——— (1996). Honest to Jesus: Jesus for a New Millennium. San Francisco, CA: HarperSanFrancisco. ISBN 9780060627577. OCLC 34967089.
- ——— (1998). The Acts of Jesus: The Search for the Authentic Deeds. San Francisco, CA: HarperSanFrancisco. ISBN 9780060629786. OCLC 37854370.
- ——— (2002). A Credible Jesus: Fragments of a Vision. Polebridge Press. ISBN 9780944344880.
- ——— (2006). Funk on Parables: Collected Essays. Polebridge Press. ISBN 9780944344996.

=== As editor ===
- ———; Hoover, Roy W., eds. (1993). The Five Gospels: The Search for the Authentic Words of Jesus. New York: Macmillan. ISBN 9780025419490. OCLC 28421734.

=== Articles and chapters ===
- ——— (June 1956). "Enigma of the famine visit". Journal of Biblical Literature. 75 (2): 130–136. doi:10.2307/3261489. JSTOR 3261489.
- ——— (September 1959). "The Wilderness". Journal of Biblical Literature. 78 (3): 205–214. doi:10.2307/3264966. JSTOR 3264966.
