= Resurrection of Jesus =

Foundational Christian doctrine that states that Jesus rose from the dead

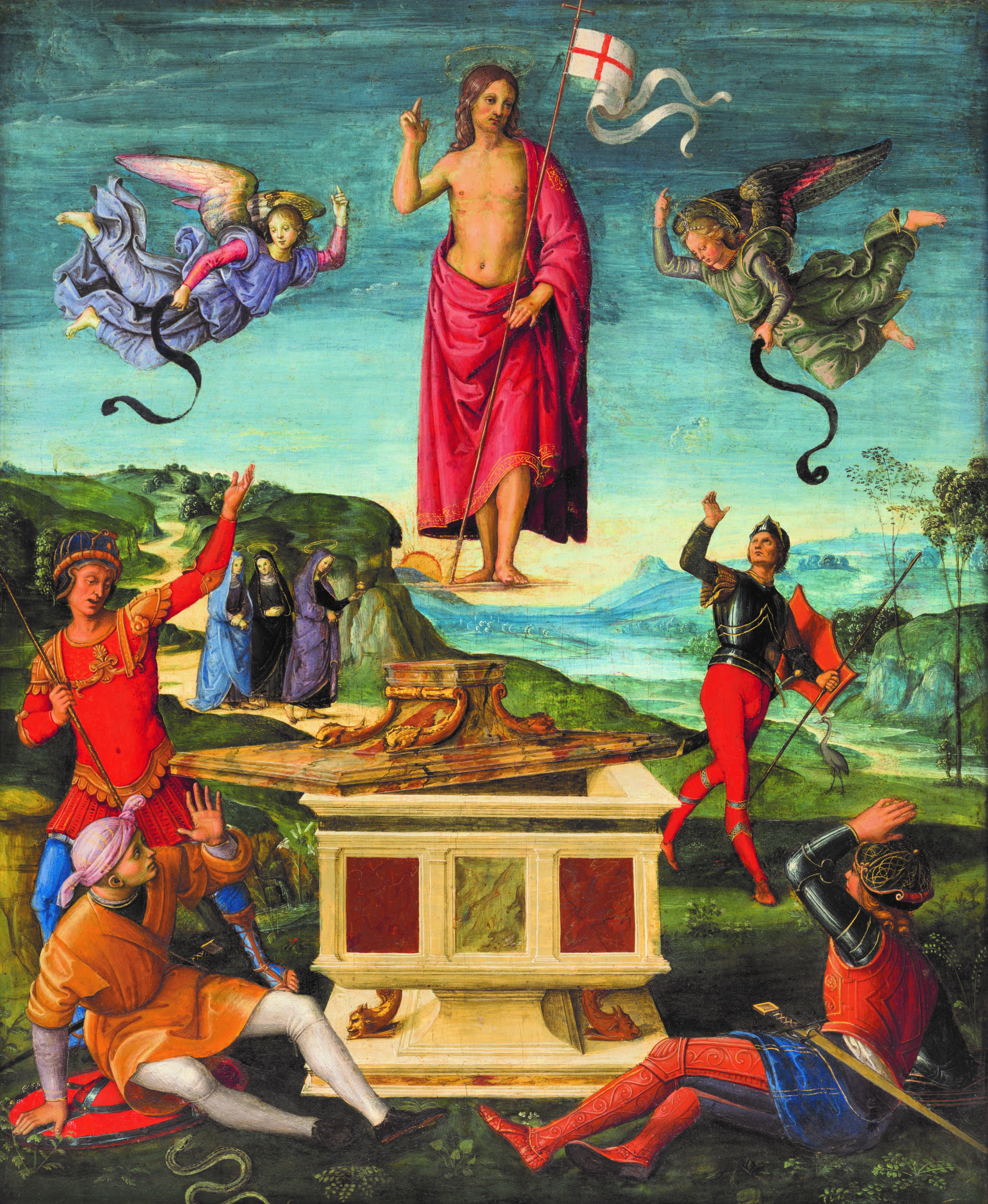
Resurrection of Jesus Christ (Kinnaird Resurrection) by Raphael, 1502

The resurrection of Jesus (Biblical Greek: ἀνάστασις τοῦ Ἰησοῦ, romanized: anástasis toú Iēsoú) is the Christian belief that God raised Jesus from the dead on the third day (Note: TestSee "Why Was Resurrection on 'the Third Day'? Two Insights" for explanations on the phrase "third day". According to Lüdemann & Özen (1996, p. 73) and Pinchas Lapide, "third day" may refer to Hosea 6:1–2: Come, let us return to the Lord; for he has torn us, that he may heal us; he has struck us down, and he will bind us up. After two days he will revive us; on the third day he will raise us up, that we may live before him. See also 2 Kings 20:8: "Hezekiah said to Isaiah, 'What shall be the sign that the Lord will heal me, and that I shall go up to the house of the Lord on the third day?'" According to Sheehan (1986, p. 112), Paul's reference to Jesus having risen "on the third day ... simply expresses the belief that Jesus was rescued from the fate of utter absence from God (death) and was admitted to the saving presence of God (the eschatological future).") after his crucifixion, starting—or restoring (Note: EB, Incarnation and humiliation) (Note: EB: "Session at the right hand of the Father was apparently a Christian interpretation of the first verse of Psalm 110. It implied the elevation—or, as the doctrine of preexistence became clearer, the restoration—of Christ to a position of honour with God. Taken together, the Ascension and the session were a way of speaking about the presence of Christ with the Father during the interim between the Resurrection and the Second Advent.")—his exalted life as Christ and Lord. (Note: Justin S. Holcomb, "What Does It Mean that Jesus Is 'The Firstborn from the Dead?'") According to the New Testament writing, Jesus was firstborn from the dead, ushering in the Kingdom of God. He appeared to his disciples, calling the apostles to the Great Commission of forgiving sin and baptizing repenters, and then ascended to Heaven.

For the Christian tradition, the miraculous bodily resurrection was the restoration to life of a transformed body powered by spirit, (Note: Habermas (2005), Research from 1975 to the Present: What are Critical Scholars Saying?) as described by Paul and the gospel authors, that led to the establishment of Christianity. In Christian theology, the resurrection of Jesus is "the central mystery of the Christian faith." It provides the foundation for that faith, as commemorated by Easter, along with Jesus's life, death and sayings. For Christians, his resurrection is the guarantee that all the Christian dead will be resurrected at Christ's second coming (parousia). The resurrection is seen as a theological affirmation that intersects with history as a precondition for understanding the historical Jesus, his suffering, and vindication.

Secular and liberal Christian scholarship asserts that religious experiences, such as the visionary appearances of Jesus (Note: These visions may mostly have appeared during corporate worship. Johan Leman contends that the communal meals provided a context in which participants entered a state of mind in which the presence of Jesus was felt.) and an inspired reading of the biblical texts, gave the impetus to the belief in the exaltation of Jesus as a "fulfillment of the scriptures," and a resumption of the missionary activity of Jesus's followers.

Scholars differ on the historicity of Jesus' burial and the empty tomb. Scholars of Jesus as a historical figure tend to generally avoid the topic, since many see resurrection as a matter of faith, or lack thereof, and outside of the scope of historical study.

Easter is the main Christian festival celebrating the resurrection of Jesus, symbolizing God's redemption and rooted in Passover traditions. The resurrection is widely depicted in Christian art and connected to relics like the Shroud of Turin, which some believe bears a miraculous image of Jesus. Gnosticism holds that only the soul is resurrected. Islam generally teaches that Jesus was not crucified but directly ascended to God; however Ahmadiyya Islam believes that Jesus survived the crucifixion and carried on his mission elsewhere.

== Biblical accounts ==
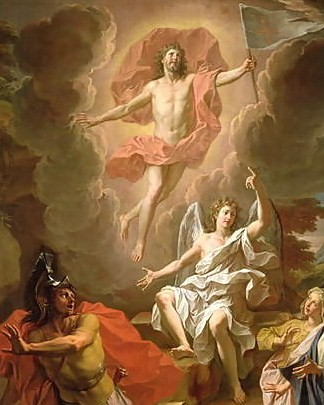
Resurrection of Christ, Noël Coypel, 1700, using a hovering depiction of Jesus

The conviction that Jesus was raised from the dead is found in the earliest evidence of Christian origins. (Note: In 1 Corinthians 15:3 – 7, Paul passes on what Judaism valued as the best evidence: first-person testimony of the resurrection. According to John Kloppenborg, Paul's "argumentation in chap.15 revolves around the reality of the resurrection; the tradition adduced by Paul in support of his argument must have contained some element of proof of the resurrection (i.e., witnesses) – otherwise there would have been no reason for Paul to adduce it in the first place". That this teaching predates Paul and the New Testament book that contains it has been almost universally acknowledged. Bart Ehrman dates the text to within one to two years of the crucifixion. However, whether the pre-Pauline material is from the earliest Aramaic-speaking community or from the Jewish-Hellenistic church is disputed.)

=== Paul and the first Christians ===
The moment of resurrection itself is not described in any of the canonical gospels, only the aftermath, but all four contain passages in which Jesus is portrayed as predicting his death and resurrection, or contain allusions that "the reader will understand". The New Testament writings do not contain any descriptions of the resurrection taking place but rather accounts of an empty tomb and purported appearances of Jesus to his followers.

One of the letters sent by Paul the Apostle to one of the early Greek churches, the First Epistle to the Corinthians, contains one of the earliest Christian creeds referring to post-mortem appearances of Jesus, and expressing the belief that he was raised from the dead, namely 1 Corinthians 15:3–8. It is widely accepted that this creed predates Paul and the writing of First Corinthians.

Scholars have contended that in his presentation of the resurrection, Paul refers to this as an earlier authoritative tradition, transmitted in a rabbinic style, that he received and has passed on to the church at Corinth. (Note: Early creed: Neufeld, The Earliest Christian Confessions (Grand Rapids: Eerdmans, 1964) p. 47; Reginald Fuller, The Formation of the Resurrection Narratives (New York: Macmillan, 1971) p. 10; Wolfhart Pannenberg, Jesus – God and Man translated Lewis Wilkins and Duane Pribe (Philadelphia: Westminster, 1968) p. 90; Oscar Cullmann, The Early Church: Studies in Early Christian History and Theology, ed. A. J. B. Higgins (Philadelphia: Westminster, 1966) p. 64; Hans Conzelmann, 1 Corinthians, translated James W. Leitch (Philadelphia: Fortress 1969) p. 251; Bultmann, Theology of the New Testament vol. 1 pp. 45, 80–82, 293; R. E. Brown, The Virginal Conception and Bodily Resurrection of Jesus (New York: Paulist Press, 1973) pp. 81, 92; Most Fellows of the Jesus Seminar also concluded that this tradition dates to before Paul's conversion, c. AD 33.) Geza Vermes writes that the creed is "a tradition he [Paul] has inherited from his seniors in the faith concerning the death, burial and resurrection of Jesus". The creed's ultimate origins are probably within the Jerusalem apostolic community, having been formalised and passed on within a few years of the resurrection. (Note: Origins within the Jerusalem apostolic community: Wolfhart Pannenberg, Jesus – God and Man translated Lewis Wilkins and Duane Pribe (Philadelphia: Westminster, 1968) p. 90; Oscar Cullmann, The Early church: Studies in Early Christian History and Theology, ed. A. J. B. Higgins (Philadelphia: Westminster, 1966) pp. 66–66; R. E. Brown, The Virginal Conception and Bodily Resurrection of Jesus (New York: Paulist Press, 1973) p. 81; Thomas Sheehan, First Coming: How the Kingdom of God Became Christianity (New York: Random House, 1986) pp. 110, 118; Ulrich Wilckens, Resurrection translated A. M. Stewart (Edinburgh: Saint Andrew, 1977) p. 2) Hans Grass argues for an origin in Damascus, and according to Paul Barnett, this creedal formula, and others, were variants of the "one basic early tradition that Paul "received" in Damascus from Ananias in about 34 [AD]" after his conversion.

[3] For I handed on to you as of first importance what I in turn had received: that Christ died for our sins in accordance with the scriptures, (Note: The kerygma from 1 Corinthians 15:3–5 refers to two mythologies: the Greek myth of the noble dead, to which the Maccabean notion of martyrdom and dying for ones people is related; and the Jewish myth of the persecuted sage or righteous man, c.q. the "story of the child of wisdom." The notion of 'dying for' refers to this martyrdom and persecution. James F. McGrath refers to 4 Maccabees, "which presents a martyr praying "Be merciful to your people, and let our punishment suffice for them. Make my blood their purification, and take my life in exchange for theirs". Clearly, there were ideas that existed in the Judaism of the time that helped make sense of the death of the righteous in terms of atonement." (Note: James F. McGrath (2007), What's Wrong With Penal Substitution?) See also Herald Gandi (2018), The Resurrection: "According to the Scriptures"?, referring to Isaiah 53, among others: "[4] Surely he has borne our infirmities and carried our diseases; yet we accounted him stricken, struck down by God, and afflicted. [5] But he was wounded for our transgressions, crushed for our iniquities; upon him was the punishment that made us whole, and by his bruises we are healed ... [10] Yet it was the will of the Lord to crush him with pain. When you make his life an offering for sin, he shall see his offspring, and shall prolong his days; through him the will of the Lord shall prosper. [11] Out of his anguish he shall see light; he shall find satisfaction through his knowledge. The righteous one, my servant, shall make many righteous, and he shall bear their iniquities.") [4] and that he was buried, and that he was raised on the third day in accordance with the scriptures, [5] and that he appeared to Cephas, then to the twelve. [6] Then he appeared to more than five hundred brothers and sisters at one time, most of whom are still alive, though some have died. [7] Then he appeared to James, then to all the apostles. [8] Last of all, as to one untimely born, he appeared also to me.

In the Jerusalem ekklēsia (Church), from which Paul received this creed, the phrase "died for our sins" probably was an apologetic rationale for the death of Jesus as being part of God's plan and purpose, as evidenced in the scriptures. For Paul, it gained a deeper significance, providing "a basis for the salvation of sinful Gentiles apart from the Torah". The phrase "died for our sins" was derived from Isaiah, especially 53:4–11, and 4 Maccabees, especially 6:28–29. "Raised on the third day" is derived from Hosea 6:1–2:

Come, let us return to the Lord;
for he has torn us, that he may heal us;
he has struck us down, and he will bind us up.
After two days he will revive us;
on the third day he will raise us up,
that we may live before him.

Paul, writing to the members of the church at Corinth, said that Jesus appeared to him in the same fashion in which he appeared to the earlier witnesses. In 2 Corinthians 12 Paul described "a man in Christ [presumably Paul himself] who ... was caught up to the third heaven", and while the language is obscure, a plausible interpretation is that the man believed he saw Jesus enthroned at the right hand of God.

The many Pauline references affirming his belief in the resurrection include:

- Romans 1:3–4: "...concerning his Son, who was descended from David according to the flesh and designated the Son of God in power according to the Spirit of holiness by his resurrection from the dead, Jesus Christ our Lord".
- 2 Timothy 2:8: "Remember Jesus Christ, raised from the dead... this is my gospel for which I am suffering even to the point of being chained like a criminal. But God's word is not chained..."
- 1 Corinthians 15:3–7: "...that Christ died for our sins in accordance with the Scriptures, that he was buried, that he was raised on the third day in accordance with the Scriptures..."

=== Gospels and Acts ===
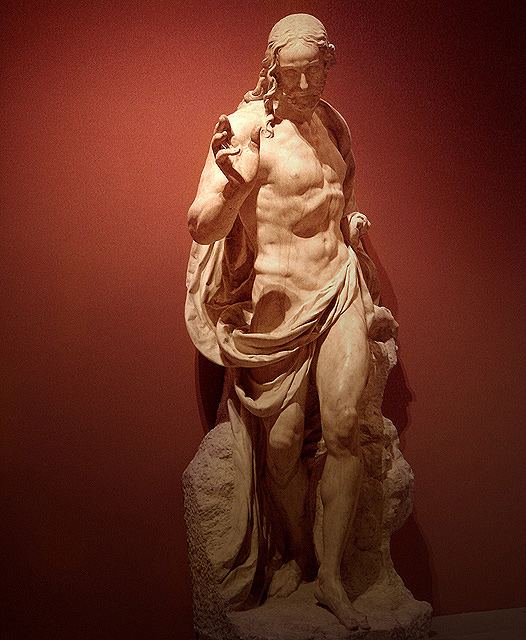
A marble representation of the Resurrection of Jesus Christ, Germain Pilon, before 1572; currently held in the Louvre collection

Jesus is described as the "firstborn from the dead", prōtotokos, the first to be raised from the dead, thereby acquiring the "special status of the firstborn as the preeminent son and heir". His resurrection is also the guarantee that all the Christian dead will be resurrected at Christ's parousia.

After the resurrection, Jesus is portrayed as calling the apostles to the Great Commission, as described in Matthew 28:16–20, Mark 16:14–18, Luke 24:44–49, John 20:19–23, and Acts 1:4–8, in which the disciples receive the call "to let the world know the good news of a victorious Saviour and the very presence of God in the world by the spirit". According to these texts, Jesus says that they "will receive power when the Holy Spirit has come upon you", that "repentance and forgiveness of sins is to be proclaimed in [the Messiah's] name to all nations, beginning from Jerusalem", and that "if you forgive the sins of any, they are forgiven them; if you retain the sins of any, they are retained".

The shorter version of the Gospel of Mark ends with the discovery of the empty tomb by Mary Magdalene, Salome, and "Mary the mother of James". A young man in a white robe at the site of the tomb announced to them that Jesus has risen, and instructed them to "tell Peter and the disciples that he will meet them in Galilee, 'just as he told you'" (Mark 16).

In the Gospel of Matthew, an angel appeared to Mary Magdalene at the empty tomb, telling her that Jesus is not there because he has been raised from the dead, and instructing her to tell the other followers to go to Galilee, to meet Jesus. Jesus then appeared to Mary Magdalene and "the other Mary" at the tomb; and next, based on Mark 16:7, Jesus appeared to all the disciples on a mountain in Galilee, where Jesus claimed authority over heaven and earth, and commissioned the disciples to preach the gospel to the whole world. In this message, the end times are delayed "to bring the world to discipleship".

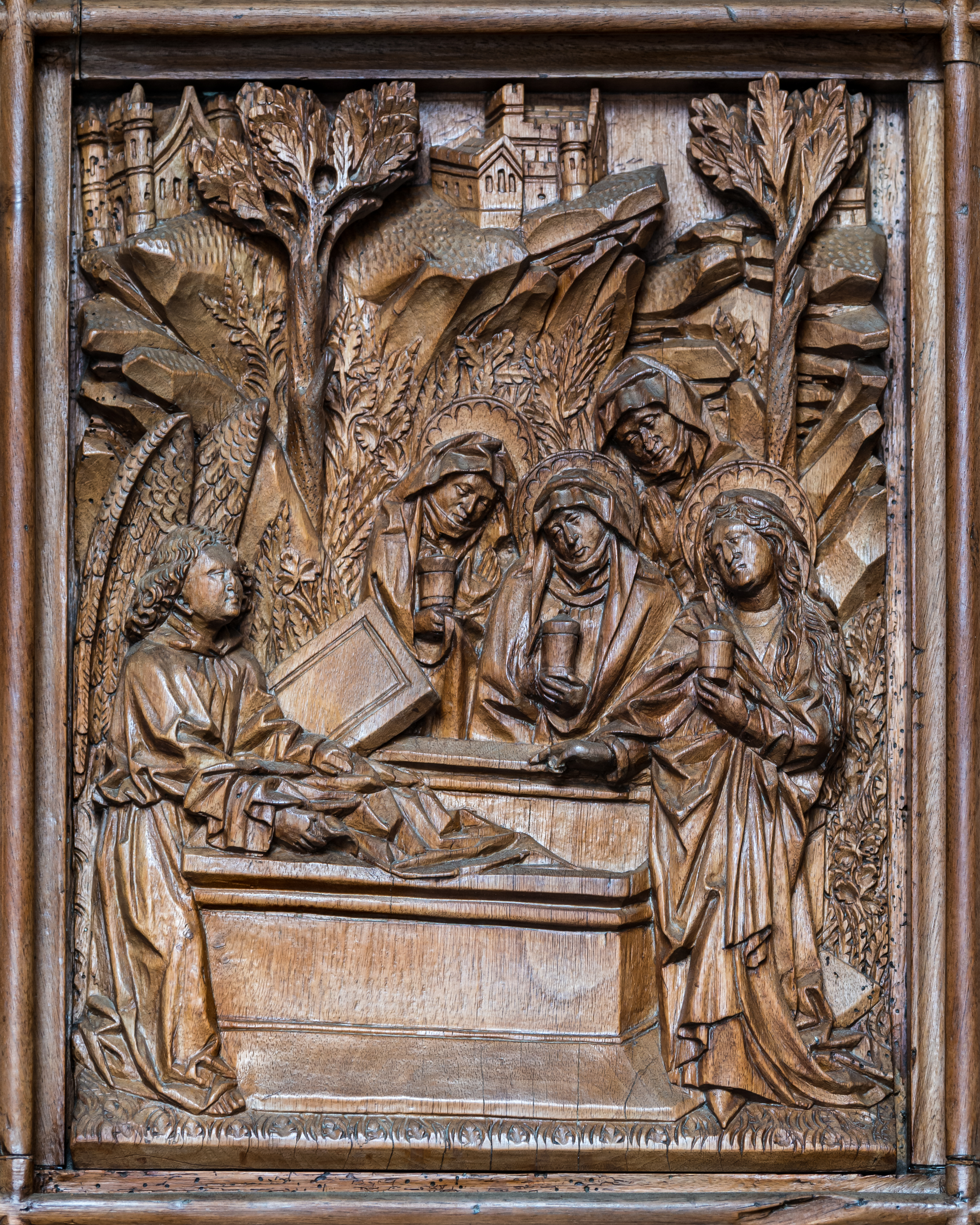
The three Marys at the Tomb of Christ (1470) at the west portal of Konstanz Minster, Baden-Württemberg, Germany

In the Gospel of Luke, "the women who had come with him from Galilee" come to his tomb, which they find empty. Two angelic beings appeared to announce that Jesus is not there but has been raised. Jesus then appeared to two followers on their way to Emmaus, who notify the eleven remaining Apostles, who respond that Jesus has appeared to Peter. While they were describing this, Jesus appeared again, explaining that he is the messiah who was raised from the dead according to the scriptures "and that repentance and forgiveness of sins is to be proclaimed in his name to all nations, beginning from Jerusalem". In Luke–Acts (two works from the same author) he then ascended into heaven, his rightful home.

In Acts of the Apostles, Jesus appeared to the apostles for forty days and commanded them to stay in Jerusalem, after which Jesus ascended to heaven, followed by the coming of the Holy Spirit at Pentecost and the missionary task of the early church.

== Jewish-Hellenistic background ==
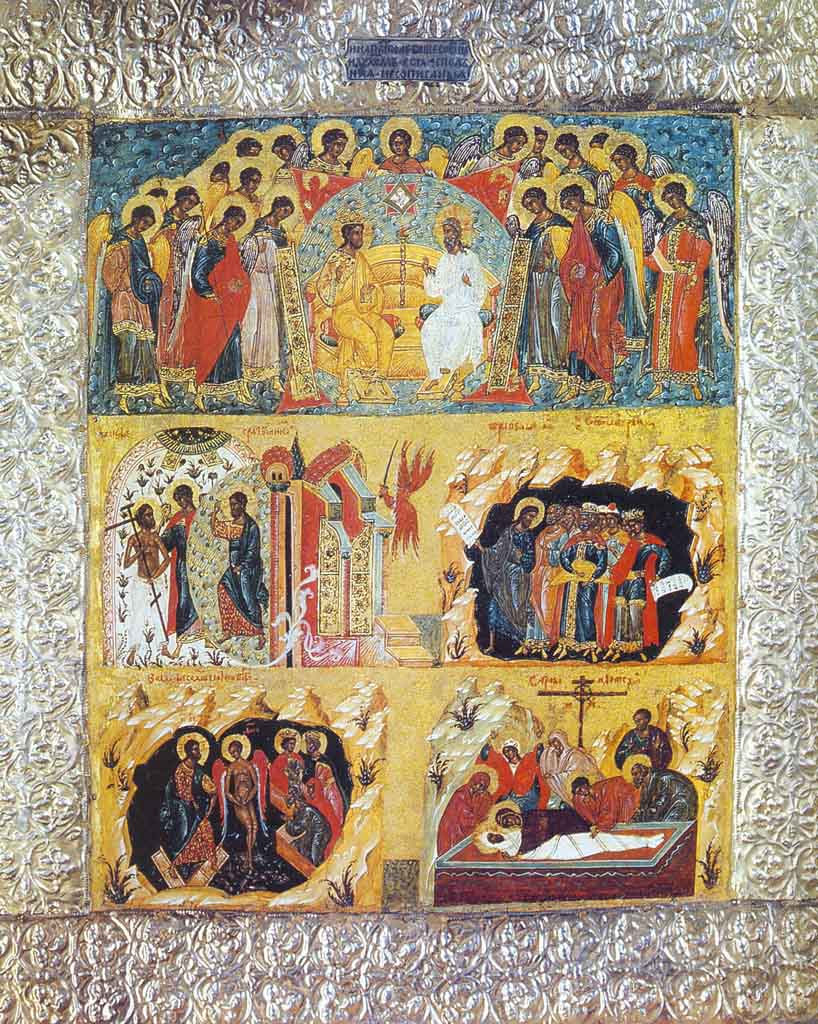
Five-part resurrection icon, Solovetsky Monastery, 17th century

=== Jewish ===
In Judaism, the idea of resurrection first emerges in the 3rd century BC Book of Watchers and in the 2nd century BC Book of Daniel, the later possibly as a belief in the resurrection of the soul alone, which was then developed by the Pharisees as a belief in bodily resurrection, an idea completely alien to the Greeks. Josephus tells of the three main Jewish sects of the 1st century AD, that the Sadducees held that both soul and body perished at death; the Essenes that the soul was immortal but the flesh was not; and the Pharisees that the soul was immortal and that the body would be resurrected to house it. Of these three positions, Jesus and the early Christians appear to have been closest to that of the Pharisees. Steve Mason notes that for the Pharisees, "the new body is a special, holy body", which is different from the old body, "a view shared to some extent by the ex-Pharisee Paul (1. Cor. 15:35ff)".

The evidence from Jewish texts and from tomb inscriptions points to a more complex reality: for example, when the author of the Book of Daniel wrote that "many of those sleeping in the dust shall awaken", religion scholar Dag Øistein Endsjø believes he probably had in mind a rebirth as angelic beings (metaphorically described as stars in God's Heaven, stars having been identified with angels from early times); such a rebirth would rule out a bodily resurrection, as angels were believed to be fleshless. Other scholars hold that Daniel exposes a belief in a bodily resurrection. Other texts range from the traditional Old Testament view that the soul would spend eternity in the underworld, to a metaphorical belief in the raising of the spirit. Most avoided defining what resurrection might imply, but a resurrection of the flesh was a marginal belief. As Outi Lehtipuu states, "belief in resurrection was far from being an established doctrine" of Second Temple Judaism.

=== Greco-Roman ===
The Greeks traditionally held that a number of men and women gained physical immortality as they were translated to live forever in either Elysium, the Islands of the Blessed, heaven, the ocean, or literally right under the ground. As such, some scholars have attempted to trace resurrection beliefs in pagan traditions concerning death and bodily disappearances and setting the Jesus tradition within a more Greco-Roman context. Such scholars have argued that the empty tomb narrative and subsequent appearances of Jesus are best understood as literary motifs within the context of Greek literary works that exhibit similar narratives in Greek mythology.

However, there is no evidence that the portrayal of Jesus in the Synoptic Gospels (the three earliest gospels of Mark, Matthew, and Luke) was directly influenced by pagan mythology in any significant way. Rather, it is widely agreed that the portrayal of Jesus in the gospels is deeply influenced by Jewish tradition. The earliest followers of Jesus were devout Jews who abhorred Paganism, and would have been unlikely to shape their accounts of their founder on pagan myths. According to Bart Ehrman, most of the alleged parallels between Jesus and pagan deities only exist in the modern imagination, and there are no "accounts of others who were born to virgin mothers and who died as an atonement for sin and then were raised from the dead". The attitudes towards resurrection were generally negative among pagans. For example, Asclepius was killed by Zeus for using herbs to resurrect the dead, but by his father Apollo's request, was subsequently immortalized as a star.

According to historian of religion Jonathan Z. Smith, modern scholars hold that "dying and rising gods" trope is incorrect since early sources on numerous gods show that gods who have died, do not resurrect or even go through rebirth. Furthermore, claims of dying and resurrected gods is based on dubious reconstructions of later sources since early indigenous sources never make such claims, and there is no clear instance of a dying and rising deity. Tryggve Mettinger, an advocate of the "dying and rising" category, writes that dying and rising gods were closely associated with seasonal cycles whereas the resurrection of Jesus was treated as a one-time historical event unrelated to seasons. Mettinger also says that there is no evidence of these gods dying a redemptive death like Jesus, concluding that there is no prima facie evidence that the death and resurrection of Jesus took inspiration from previous myths.

From Hellenistic times on, some Greeks held that the soul of a meritorious man could be translated into a god in the process of apotheosis (divinization) which then transferred them to a special place of honour. Successors of Alexander the Great made this idea very well known throughout the Middle East through coins bearing his image, a privilege previously reserved for gods. The idea was adopted by the Roman emperors, and in the Imperial Roman concept of apotheosis, the earthly body of the recently deceased emperor was replaced by a new and divine one as he ascended into heaven. These stories proliferated in the middle to late first century.

The apotheosised dead remained recognisable to those who met them, as when Romulus appeared to witnesses after his death, but as the biographer Plutarch (c. AD 46 – c. 120) explained of this incident, while something within humans comes from the gods and returns to them after death, this happens "only when it is most completely separated and set free from the body, and becomes altogether pure, fleshless, and undefiled".

== Historicity of the burial and empty tomb narratives ==
Contemporary scholarship on the historical Jesus has often avoided the question of the resurrection, treating it as a theological rather than historical matter, a tendency Bockmuehl argues weakens the methodological rigor and completeness of such research.

Scholars differ on the historicity of the empty tomb story and the relation between the burial stories and the postmortem appearances. Scholars also differ on whether Jesus received a decent burial. Points of contention are:

1. Whether Jesus's body was taken off the cross before sunset or left on the cross to decay,
2. Whether his body was taken off the cross and buried specifically by Joseph of Arimathea, or by the Sanhedrin or a group of Jews in general, and
3. Whether he was entombed (and if so, what kind of tomb) or buried in a common grave.

With regard to the question of what produced the faith that Jesus was raised from the dead, Schroter and Jacobi state that the assumption of the empty tomb, and the view that the disciples were convinced they saw Jesus risen from the dead, finds wide support in New Testament scholarship. Challenges such as Gerd Ludemanns, who argues that the tomb was not really empty but takes the stories of Jesus's appearances as describing real events, explaining them as subjective visions, remain a minority. (Note: Jacobi: "In the more recent past [...] Gerd Ludemann (1994, 2002) drew on the subjective vision hypothesis and described Jesus's tomb as "full". This position can be considered a minority opinion. At present however, the assumption that Jesus's tomb was indeed empty and that his disciples were convinced that they had seen the resurrection Jesus finds wide support among New Testament scholars.") Yet they also note that "The question about the historicity of the empty tomb [...] cannot be answered." They say that the empty tomb does not seem to be the factor that produces faith in the resurrection, but rather functions as a narrative link between crucifixion and resurrection. (Note: Schroter and Jacobi (2022): "The question about the historicity of the empty tomb, therefore, cannot be answered. Nevertheless, it is decisive that no significance is ascribed to it according to the witness of the New Testament. In the Gospels, the empty tomb in itself does not produce faith. Its function on the level of the narrative, however, consists in linking the experience of the crucifixion and burial with the appearances. To this extent it is a part of the narrative implementation of the Easter traditions in the framework of the story of Jesus in the Gospels.")

In the field of philosophy of religion, Richard Swinburne has developed a Bayesian argument that combines background evidence concerning the existence of God with the historical testimony regarding Jesus's life, death, and reported resurrection, concluding that the hypothesis of Jesus's bodily resurrection is highly probable.

=== Burial ===
An often noted argument in favour of a decent burial before sunset is the Jewish custom, based on Deuteronomy 21:22–23, which says the body must not be left exposed overnight, but must be buried that day. This is also attested in the Temple Scroll of the Essenes, and in Josephus' Jewish War 4.5.2§317, where he testifies the custom of burying the crucified before sunset, in a critique of the rebels, who did not do so. Reference is made to the Digesta, a Roman Law Code from the 6th century AD, which contains material from the 2nd century AD, stating that "the bodies of those who have been punished are only buried when this has been requested and permission granted". Burial of people who were executed by crucifixion is also attested by archaeological finds from Jehohanan, a body of an apparently crucified man with a nail in the heel which could not be removed who was buried in a tomb.

Contra a decent burial, Martin Hengel has argued that Jesus was buried in disgrace as an executed criminal who died a shameful death, a view which is "now widely accepted and has become entrenched in scholarly literature". John Dominic Crossan argued that Jesus's followers did not know what happened to the body. (Note: Allison refers to "Crossan, Historical Jesus, 391–4; idem, Jesus: A Revolutionary Biography (San Francisco: HarperSanFrancisco, 1994), 123–58; idem, Who Killed Jesus? Exposing the Roots of Anti-Semitism in the Gospel Story of the Death of Jesus (San Francisco: HarperSanFrancisco, 1996), 160–77))") According to Crossan, Joseph of Arimathea is "a total Markan creation in name, in place, and in function", (Note: Allison refers to Crossan (1996), Who Killed Jesus?) arguing that Jesus's followers inferred from Deut. 21:22–23 that Jesus was buried by a group of law-abiding Jews, as described in Acts 13:29.

New Testament scholar Dale Allison writes that this story was adapted by Mark, turning the group of Jews into a specific person. Roman practice was often to leave the body on the stake, denying an honourable or family burial, stating that "the dogs were waiting." Archaeologist Byron McCane argues that it was customary to dispose of the dead immediately, yet concludes that "Jesus was buried in disgrace in a criminal's tomb". British New Testament scholar Maurice Casey also notes that "Jewish criminals were supposed to receive a shameful and dishonourable burial", and argues that Jesus was indeed buried by Joseph of Arimathea, but in a tomb for criminals owned by the Sanhedrin. He therefore rejects the empty tomb narrative as legendary.

New Testament historian Bart D. Ehrman writes that it cannot be known what happened to Jesus's body; he doubts that Jesus had a decent burial, and also thinks that it is doubtful that Jesus was buried by Joseph of Arimathea specifically. According to Ehrman, "what was originally a vague statement that the unnamed Jewish leaders buried Jesus becomes a story of one leader in particular, who is named, doing so". (Note: In an earlier publication (2003), Ehrman recognized that "Some scholars have argued that it's more plausible that in fact Jesus was placed in a common burial plot, which sometimes happened, or was, as many other crucified people, simply left to be eaten by scavenging animals", but further elaborated by stating that "[T]he accounts are fairly unanimous in saying ... that Jesus was in fact buried by this fellow, Joseph of Arimathea, and so it's relatively reliable that that's what happened.") Ehrman gives three reasons for doubting a decent burial. Referring to Hengel and Crossan, Ehrman argues that crucifixion was meant "to torture and humiliate a person as fully as possible", and the body was normally left on the stake to be eaten by animals. Ehrman further argues that criminals were usually buried in common graves; and Pilate had no concern for Jewish sensitivities, which makes it unlikely that he would have allowed Jesus to be buried.

A number of Christian authors have rejected the criticisms, taking the Gospel accounts to be historically reliable. (Note: Wright (2009, p. 22) argues that the burial of Christ is part of the earliest gospel traditions.) Dale Allison, reviewing the arguments of Crossan and Ehrman, finds their assertions strong, but "find[s] it likely that a man named Joseph, probably a Sanhedrist, from the obscure Arimathea, sought and obtained permission from the Roman authorities to make arrangements for Jesus's hurried burial". James Dunn states that "the tradition is firm that Jesus was given a proper burial (Mark 15.42–47 pars.), and there are good reasons why its testimony should be respected".

Dunn argues that the burial tradition is "one of the oldest pieces of tradition we have", referring to 1 Cor. 15.4; burial was in line with Jewish custom as prescribed by Deut. 21:22–23 and confirmed by Josephus War; cases of burial of crucified persons are known, as attested by the Yehohanan burial; Joseph of Arimathea "is a very plausible historical character"; and "the presence of the women at the cross and their involvement in Jesus's burial can be attributed more plausibly to early oral memory than to creative story-telling". Craig A. Evans refers to Deut. 21:22–23 and Josephus to argue that the entombment of Jesus accords with Jewish sensitivities and historical reality. Evans also notes that "politically, too, it seems unlikely that, on the eve of Passover, a holiday that celebrates Israel's liberation from foreign domination, Pilate would have wanted to provoke the Jewish population" by denying Jesus a proper burial.

According to religion professor John Granger Cook, there are historical texts that mention mass graves, but they contain no indication of those bodies being dug up by animals. There is no mention of an open pit or shallow graves in any Roman text. There are a number of historical texts outside the gospels showing the bodies of the crucified dead were buried by family or friends. Cook writes that "those texts show that the narrative of Joseph of Arimethaea's burial of Jesus would be perfectly comprehensible to a Greco-Roman reader of the gospels and historically credible".

=== Empty tomb ===
==== Skepticism about the empty tomb narrative ====
Early on, the stories about the empty tomb were met with skepticism. The Gospel of Matthew already mentions stories that the body was stolen from the grave. Other suggestions, not supported in mainstream scholarship, are that Jesus had not really died on the cross, was lost due to natural causes, or was replaced by an impostor.

The belief that Jesus did not really die on the cross but only appeared to do so is found in a wide variety of early texts, and probably has its historical roots in the earliest stages of Christianity. According to Israeli religion scholar Gedaliahu Stroumsa, this idea came first, and later, docetism broadened to include Jesus was a spirit without flesh. It is probable these were present in the 1st century, as it is against such doctrines that the author of 1 and 2 John seems to argue.

The absence of any reference to the story of Jesus's empty tomb in the Pauline epistles and the Easter kerygma (preaching or proclamation) of the earliest church has led some scholars to suggest that Mark invented it. (Note: Bultmann dismisses the empty tomb story as "an apologetic legend.") Allison, however, finds this argument from silence unconvincing. Most scholars believe that the Gospel of Mark and the Gospel of John contain two independent attestations of an empty tomb, which in turn suggests that both used already-existing sources and appealed to a commonly held tradition, though Mark may have added to and adapted that tradition to fit his narrative. Other scholars have argued that instead, Paul presupposes the empty tomb, specifically in the early creed passed down in 1 Corinthians 15. Christian biblical scholars have used textual critical methods to support the historicity of the tradition that "Mary of Magdala had indeed been the first to see Jesus", most notably the criterion of embarrassment in recent years. According to Dale Allison, the inclusion of women as the first witnesses to the risen Jesus "once suspect, confirms the truth of the story".

==== Empty tomb and resurrection appearances ====
N. T. Wright emphatically and extensively argues for the reality of the empty tomb and the subsequent appearances of Jesus, reasoning that as a matter of "inference" both a bodily resurrection and later bodily appearances of Jesus are far better explanations for the empty tomb and the 'meetings' and the rise of Christianity than are any other theories, including those of Ehrman. Raymond E. Brown concurred, stating "...in my judgment, the evidence for the bodily resurrection of Jesus is strong...", and critiqued skeptical objections. Dale Allison argues for an empty tomb that was later followed by visions of Jesus by the Apostles and Mary Magdalene, while also accepting the historicity of the resurrection. While he acknowledges contradictions in the Gospels' narratives, he argues that they agree on the important themes and that the differences are inconsequential when judging the historical event as a whole. Allison has endorsed David Graieg's work on the Resurrection appearances, which also argues that early Christians remembered Jesus as having physically risen from the dead. Using a methodology based on memory theory, Graieg argues that Paul in First Corinthians remembered Jesus as having bodily risen from the dead and that the resurrection was of core importance to early Christians. Graieg argues that Jesus physically rose from the dead and that he was remembered by Christians as having risen in a metamorphized form.

Religion professor Dag Øistein Endsjø points to how the notion of an empty tomb would fit with the ancient Greek beliefs that any case of immortalization always required absolute physical continuity. A vanished body could consequently be an indication of someone having been made immortal, as seen for instance in the case of Aristaeus, the Trojan prince Ganymede, and princess Orithyia of Athens, whose mysterious disappearances were seen as the result of their being swept away to a physically immortal existence by the gods, Heracles whose lack of bodily remains after his funeral pyre was considered proof of his physical immortalization, and Aristeas of Proconnesus who was held to have reappeared after his body vanished from a locked room, which Endsjø interprets as something like a resurrection.

J. D. Atkins argues that the narratives of Jesus contacting the disciples physically in Luke and John are not apologetic responses to docetism, and Siniscalchi suggests the gospels reliably preserved memory of the earliest appearance traditions. Jorg Frey also argues against applying docetism to first century works. Smith argues that Mark has integrated two traditions, which were first separate, on the disappearance (from the tomb, interpreted as being taken to heaven) and appearance (post-mortem appearances), into one Easter narrative. According to Géza Vermes, the story of the empty tomb developed independently from the stories of the post-resurrection appearances, as they are never directly coordinated to form a combined argument. While the coherence of the empty tomb narrative is questionable, it is "clearly an early tradition". Vermes notes that the story of the empty tomb conflicts with notions of a spiritual resurrection. According to Vermes, "[t]he strictly Jewish bond of spirit and body is better served by the idea of the empty tomb and is no doubt responsible for the introduction of the notions of palpability (Thomas in John) and eating (Luke and John)". Ehrman rejects the story of the empty tomb, and argues that "an empty tomb had nothing to do with it ... an empty tomb would not produce faith". Ehrman argues that the empty tomb was needed to underscore the physical resurrection of Jesus.

== Nature of the resurrection body ==
Géza Vermes notes that the story of the empty tomb conflicts with notions of a spiritual resurrection. According to Vermes, "[t]he strictly Jewish bond of spirit and body is better served by the idea of the empty tomb and is no doubt responsible for the introduction of the notions of palpability (Thomas in John) and eating (Luke and John)".

Both Ware and Cook argue, primarily from Paul's terminology and the contemporary Jewish, pagan and cultural understanding of the nature of resurrection, that Paul held to a physically resurrected body (sōma), restored to life, but animated by spirit (pneumatikos) instead of soul (psuchikos), just like the later Gospel accounts. (Note: Larry Hurtado (11 September 2014 ), Paul on Jesus' Resurrection: A New Study) The nature of this resurrected body is a matter of debate. In 1 Corinthians 15:44, Paul uses the phrase "spiritual body" (sōma pneumatikos), which has been explained as a "Spirit-empowered body", (Note: Taylor S. Brown (August 3, 2018), The Resurrection of the Body: Spiritual? Physical? Both, Actually.) but also as a "celestial body", made of a finer material than the flesh. (Note: According to Christian apologist Gary Habermas, "Many [conservative] scholars have spoken in support of a [transformed] bodily notion of Jesus' resurrection." According to Habermas, Paul refers to a physical body in 1 Corinthians 15:44. Habermas notes that Paul doesn't use solely the word pneuma, but speaks about "spiritual [pneumatikos] body [soma]". According to Habermas, Paul refers to a physical body, arguing that "Paul says three things in one chapter [of Philippians] that indicates that he's talking about a physical resurrection." The first is that Paul says that he is a Pharisee, implying that he believes in a physical resurrection. The second is that, in Philippians 3:11, Paul says "That I may attain the resurrection of the dead", using the phrase eks-anastasis ("εἰς τὴν ἐξανάστασιν") (out-resurrection), "resurrection from out among the dead ones." And third, in Philippians 3:20–21 "He Jesus will change my body to be like His body." Habermas further notes that in Philippians 3:20,21, Paul speaks of a "glorious body" which is resurrected. (Note: John Ankerberg and Gary Habermas (2000), The Resurrection of Jesus Christ: Was it Physical or Spiritual?))

In the Epistle to the Philippians Paul describes how the body of the resurrected Christ is utterly different from the one he wore when he had "the appearance of a man", and holds out a similar glorified state, when Christ "will transform our lowly body", as the goal of the Christian life – "flesh and blood cannot inherit the kingdom of God" (I Corinthians 15:50), and Christians entering the kingdom will be "putting off the body of the flesh" (Colossians 2:11). Paul opposed the notion of a purely spiritual resurrection, as propagated by some Christians in Corinth, which he addresses in 1 Corinthians. The developing Gospel tradition emphasized the material aspects to counter this spiritual interpretation.

Paul's views of a bodily resurrection went against the thoughts of the Greek philosophers to whom a bodily resurrection meant a new imprisonment in a corporeal body, which was what they wanted to avoid – given that, for them, the corporeal and the material fettered the spirit.

James Dunn notes that there is a great difference between Paul's resurrection appearance, and the appearances described in the Gospels. Where "Paul's seeing was visionary ... , 'from heaven'", in contrast, the Gospel accounts have a "massive realism" to them, as seen for example in Luke having Jesus insisting that he was of "flesh and bones", and John having Jesus asking Thomas to touch his wounds. Dunn contends that the "massive realism' ... of the [Gospel] appearances themselves can only be described as visionary with great difficulty – and Luke would certainly reject the description as inappropriate". According to Dunn, most scholars explain this as a "legendary materialization" of the visionary experiences, "borrowing the traits of the earthly Jesus". (Note: According to Sheehan, Paul's account of the resurrection is not meant to be taken as referring to a literal, physical rising from the grave. Paul's understanding of the resurrection, and perhaps Peter's as well, is a metaphorical one, with the stories of Jesus's (figurative) resurrection reflecting his triumphant "entry into God's eschatological presence." Sheehan: The word "resurrection" is a metaphor that unfortunately has been taken literally. That's where the confusion begins. In the New Testament the word for "resurrection" means literally "awakening," like waking up your kids in the morning. The New Testament says not that God "resurrected" Jesus from the dead, but that he "awoke" him. Using metaphoric language, the New Testament says God awoke Jesus from the sleep of death and brought him into God's heavenly presence. There's nothing here about an event in space and time. Resurrection doesn't mean coming back to life." Sheehan quotes Helmut Koester: "Resurrection is thus a mythological metaphor for God's victory over the powers of unrighteousness. ... The preaching of Jesus' resurrection was thus the proclamation that the new age had been ushered in": "The Structure and Criteria of Early Christian Beliefs" in Robinson and Koester, Trajectories, 223, 224.) Yet, according to Dunn, there was both "a tendency away from the physical ... and a reverse tendency towards the physical". The tendency towards the material is most clear, but there are also signs for the tendency away from the physical, and "there are some indications that a more physical understanding was current in the earliest Jerusalem community".

== Significance in Christianity ==
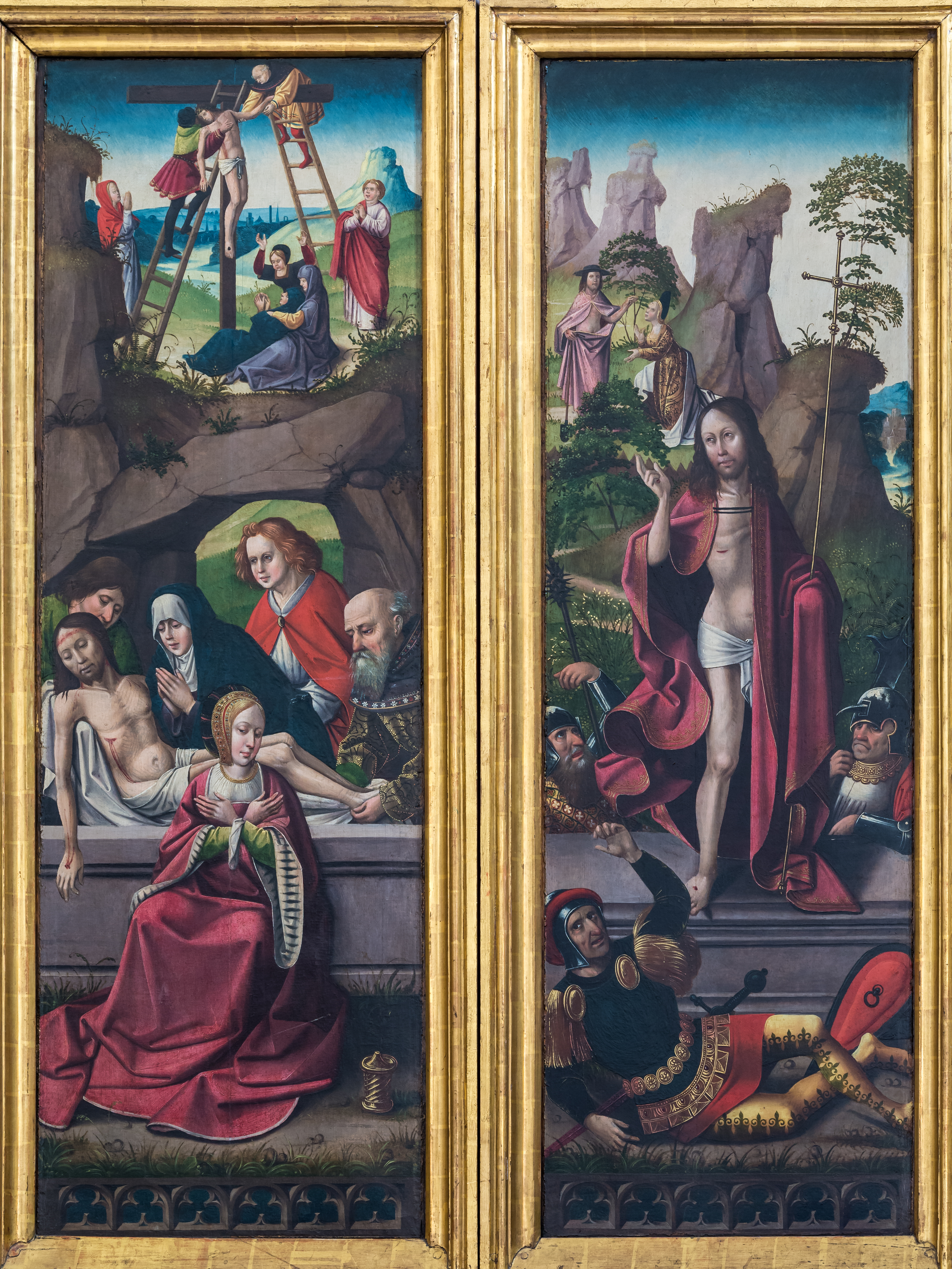
Right wing of the winged triptych at the Church of the Teutonic Order, Vienna, Austria. The artwork depicts Christ's crucifixion and burial (left), and resurrection (right).

=== Foundation of Christian faith ===
In Christian theology, the death, resurrection, and exaltation of Jesus are the most important events, and the foundation of the Christian faith. (Note: 1 Cor 15:12–20 1 Peter 1:3) The Nicene Creed states: "On the third day he rose again in accordance with the Scriptures". According to Terry Miethe, a Christian philosopher at Oxford University, the question "'Did Jesus rise from the dead?' is the most important question regarding the claims of the Christian faith." According to John R. Rice, a Baptist evangelist, the resurrection of Jesus was part of the plan of salvation and redemption by atonement for man's sin. According to the Roman Catechism of the Catholic Church, the resurrection of Jesus causes and is the model of the resurrection of all the dead, as well as the cause and model of repentance, which the catechism calls "spiritual resurrection". Summarizing its traditional analysis, the Catholic Church states in its Catechism:

Although the Resurrection was an historical event that could be verified by the sign of the empty tomb and by the reality of the apostles' encounters with the risen Christ, still it remains at the very heart of the mystery of faith as something that transcends and surpasses history.

For orthodox Christians, including a number of scholars, the resurrection of Jesus is taken to have been a concrete, material resurrection of a transformed body. Scholars such as Craig L. Blomberg and Mike Licona argue there are sufficient arguments for the historicity of the resurrection.

In secular and liberal Christian scholarship, the post-resurrection appearances are often interpreted as being subjective visionary experiences in which Jesus's presence was felt, as articulated in the vision theory of Jesus's appearances. (Note: According to Habermas, a Christian apologist, both internal states of mind, such as hallucinations, conversion disorder, and bereavement-related visions, as well as objective phenomena such as illusions have been proposed as possible natural explanations for what the disciples believed they saw.) In the 21st century, modern scholars such as Gerd Lüdemann and Bart D. Ehrman have proposed that Peter had a vision of Jesus due to severe grief and mourning. (Note: "Gerd Lüdemann 2012: 552 (cf. 550–557); 2004: 159 (cf. 163–166); 1994: 174 (cf. 173–179). See also Bart Ehrman 2014: 183–206, although Ehrman never describes the vision he proposes. Other proponents of some form of vision hypothesis include Michael Goulder (1996, 2000, 2005) and James Crossley (2005), although Goulder proposes only a spiritual resurrection belief emerged initially, and Crossley considers Jesus' predictions of his own death historical and a contributing factor to the resurrection belief.") Ehrman's "tentative suggestion" is that only a few followers had visions before convincing most, but not all of their associates, that Jesus was raised from the dead. (Note: According to Sanders, "there seems to have been a competition: 'I saw him,' 'so did I,' 'the women saw him first,' 'no, I did; they didn't see him at all,' and so on.") Eventually, these stories were retold and embellished, leading to the story that all disciples had seen the risen Jesus. The belief in Jesus's resurrection radically changed their perceptions, concluding from his absence that he must have been exalted to heaven, by God himself, exalting him to an unprecedented status and authority. Ehrman notes that "Christian apologists sometimes claim that the most sensible historical explanation for these visions is that Jesus [physically] appeared to the disciples".

While the vision theory has gained support among critical scholars since the last quarter of the 20th century, conservative Christian scholars who believe in a bodily resurrection reject the visionary theories in favor of a literal interpretation of the textual accounts of a physical resurrection.

=== First ekklēsia ===
The belief in the resurrection by Jesus's early followers formed the proclamation of the first ekklēsia (lit. 'assembly'). The "visions of the resurrected/exalted Christ" reinforced the impact Jesus and his ministry had on his early followers, and interpreted in a scriptural framework they gave the impetus to Christ-devotion and the belief in the exaltation of Jesus. Jesus's death was interpreted in light of the scriptures as a redemptive death, being part of God's plan. The subsequent appearances led to the resumption of the missionary activity of Jesus's followers, with Peter assuming the leadership role in the first ekklēsia (which formed the basis for the Apostolic succession).

In the Antiquities of the Jews, a 1st-century account of Jewish history by Josephus, believers of the resurrection are discussed. However, this reference to the resurrection is widely believed to have been added by a Christian interpolator. Within the non-canonical literature of Gospel of Peter, there is a retelling of the resurrection of Jesus.

==== Exaltation and Christology ====
===== Christ-devotion =====
The New Testament writings contend that the resurrection was "the beginning of His exalted life" (Note: Novakovic quotes C.E.B. Cranfield, The Epistle to the Romans, 1:62.) as Christ and Lord and the inauguration of a new eschatological age ushering in the last days. (Note: Ushering in the last days and the Kingdom of God: James Dunn (2006), The Theology of Paul the Apostle, p.240: "...the resurrection of Jesus was understood by Paul (as those before him) as ushering in a new age, even the last days."; Paula Fredriksen (2018), When Christians Were Jews, pp. 86–87: "The Kingdom truly was at hand. Jesus' own resurrection was for them meaningful as the first of a cascade of anticipated Endtime events."; Wright (2003, p. 272): "He [Paul] believed himself to be living at a new stage in the eschatological timetable: the 'age to come' had already begun, precisely with the Messiah's resurrection.") As Borg and Crossan note, "For Mark the kingdom of God is already here because the Son of Man is already present". Jesus is the "firstborn of the dead", prōtotokos, the first to be raised from the dead, thereby acquiring the "special status of the firstborn as the preeminent son and heir". Gregory Beale writes:

"Firstborn" refers to the high, privileged position that Christ has as a result of the resurrection from the dead ... Christ has gained such a sovereign position over the cosmos, not in the sense that he is recognized as the first-created being of all creation or as the origin of creation, but in the sense that he is the inaugurator of the new creation by means of his resurrection.

Hurtado notes that soon after his death, Jesus was called Lord (Kyrios), which "associates him in astonishing ways with God". The term Lord reflected the belief that God had exalted Jesus to a divine status "at God's 'right hand'". The worship of God as expressed in the phrase "call upon the name of the Lord [Yahweh]" was also applied to Jesus, invocating his name "in corporate worship and in the wider devotional pattern of Christian believers (e.g., baptism, exorcism, healing)".

According to Hurtado, powerful religious experiences were an indispensable factor in the emergence of Christ-devotion. (Note: See also Andrew Chester (2007), Messiah and Exaltation: Jewish Messianic and Visionary Traditions and New Testament Christology, Mohr Siebeck; and Larry Huratdo (11 December 2012), "'Early High Christology': A Recent Assessment of Scholarly Debate".) Those experiences "seem to have included visions of (and/or ascents to) God's heaven, in which the glorified Christ was seen in an exalted position". Those experiences were interpreted in the framework of God's redemptive purposes, as reflected in the scriptures, in a "dynamic interaction between devout, prayerful searching for, and pondering over, scriptural texts and continuing powerful religious experiences". This initiated a "new devotional pattern unprecedented in Jewish monotheism", that is, the worship of Jesus next to God, giving Jesus a central place because his ministry, and its consequences, had a strong impact on his early followers. Revelations, including those visions, but also inspired and spontaneous utterances, and "charismatic exegesis" of the Jewish scriptures, convinced them that this devotion was commanded by God.

===== Low and High Christology =====
It has long been argued that the New Testament writings contain two different Christologies, namely a "low" or adoptionist Christology, and a "high" or "incarnation Christology". The "low Christology" or "adoptionist Christology" is the belief "that God exalted Jesus to be his Son by raising him from the dead", thereby raising him to "divine status", as in Romans 1:4. The other early Christology is "high Christology", which is "the view that Jesus was a pre-existent divine being who became a human, did the Father's will on earth, and then was taken back up into heaven whence he had originally come", and from where he appeared on earth. The chronology of the development of these early Christologies is a matter of debate within contemporary scholarship. (Note: Larry Hurtado, The Origin of "Divine Christology"?)

According to the "evolutionary model" c.q. "evolutionary theories", as proposed by Bousset, followed by Brown, the Christological understanding of Christ developed over time, from a low Christology to a high Christology, as witnessed in the Gospels. According to the evolutionary model, the earliest Christians believed that Jesus was a human who was exalted, c.q. adopted as God's Son, when he was resurrected, signalling the nearness of the Kingdom of God, when all dead would be resurrected and the righteous exalted. Later beliefs shifted the exaltation to his baptism, birth, and subsequently to the idea of his eternal existence, as witnessed in the Gospel of John. Mark shifted the moment of when Jesus became the son to the baptism of Jesus, and later still Matthew and Luke shifted it to the moment of the divine conception, and finally John declared that Jesus had been with God from the beginning: "In the beginning was the Word".

Since the 1970s, the late datings for the development of a "high Christology" have been contested, and a majority of scholars argue that this "High Christology" existed already before the writings of Paul. This "incarnation Christology" or "high Christology" did not evolve over a longer time, but was a "big bang" of ideas which were already present at the start of Christianity, and took further shape in the first few decades of the church, as witnessed in the writings of Paul. (Note: Larry Hurtado (10 July 2015 ), "'Early High Christology': A 'Paradigm Shift'? 'New Perspective'?")

According to Ehrman, these two Christologies existed alongside each other, calling the "low Christology" an "adoptionist Christology", and the "high Christology" an "incarnation Christology". While adoptionism was declared heresy at the end of the 2nd century, it was adhered to by the Ebionites, who regarded Jesus as the Messiah while rejecting his divinity and his virgin birth, and insisted on the necessity of following Jewish law and rites. They revered James the brother of Jesus (James the Just); and rejected Paul the Apostle as an apostate from the Law. They show strong similarities with the earliest form of Jewish Christianity, and their specific theology may have been a "reaction to the law-free Gentile mission".

In the "pre-existence" Christology, Christ's resurrection and exaltation was a restoration of the exalted status he already had, but had not grasped at, as described in Philippians 2:6–11.

==== Redemptive death ====
Jesus's death was interpreted as a redemptive death "for our sins", in accordance with God's plan as contained in the Jewish scriptures. The significance lay in "the theme of divine necessity and fulfilment of the scriptures", not in the later Pauline emphasis on "Jesus's death as a sacrifice or an expiation for our sins". For the early Jewish Christians, "the idea that Messiah's death was a necessary redemptive event functioned more as an apologetic explanation for Jesus's crucifixion" "proving that Jesus's death was no surprise to God". (Note: Hurtado cites Green, The Death of Jesus, p. 323.)

==== Call to missionary activity ====
The New Testament accounts describe the resurrected Jesus calling his followers to missionary activity in what has been traditionally labelled as the Great Commission, where he instructs them to "make disciples of all nations, baptizing them in the name of the Father, and of the Son, and the Holy Spirit".

According to Dunn, the appearances to the disciples have "a sense of obligation to make the vision known". Helmut Koester states that the stories of the resurrection were originally epiphanies in which the disciples were called to a ministry by the risen Jesus, and were later used as evidence of the event. Biblical scholar Géza Vermes argues that the resurrection is to be understood as a reviving of the self-confidence of the followers of Jesus, under the influence of the Spirit, "prompting them to resume their apostolic mission". (Note: Vermes describes are eight possible theories to explain the resurrection of Jesus, concluding that none of these six possibilities "stands up to stringent scrutiny", and then stating that the resurrection is a "resurrection in the hearts of men.") According to Gerd Lüdemann, Peter convinced the other disciples that the resurrection of Jesus signalled that the end-times were near and God's Kingdom was coming, when the dead would rise again, as evidenced by Jesus. This revitalized the disciples, starting off their new mission. (Note: Bart Ehrman (5 October 2012), Gerd Lüdemann on the Resurrection of Jesus)

==== Leadership of Peter ====
Peter claimed forcefully that Jesus appeared to him, and legitimised by Jesus's appearance he assumed leadership of the group of early followers, forming the Jerusalem ekklēsia mentioned by Paul. He was soon eclipsed in this leadership by James the Just, "the Brother of the Lord", which may explain why the early texts contain scarce information about Peter. (Note: According to Lüdemann, in the discussions about the strictness of adherence to the Jewish Law, the more conservative faction of James the Just took the overhand over the more liberal position of Peter, who soon lost influence. According to Dunn, this was not an "usurpation of power", but a consequence of Peter's involvement in missionary activities.) According to Gerd Lüdemann, Peter was the first who saw Jesus, noting that Peter and Mary both had appearance-experiences, but arguing that the tradition of Mary's appearance is a later development, and her appearance probably was not the first.

According to Christian proto-orthodoxy, Peter was the first to who Jesus appeared, and therefore the rightful leader of the Church. The resurrection forms the basis of the Apostolic succession and the institutional power of orthodoxy, as the heirs of Peter, to whom Jesus appeared, and is described as "the rock" on which the church will be built. Though the Gospels, and Paul's letters, describe appearances to a greater number of people, only the appearances to the Twelve Apostles count as lending authority and Apostolic succession.

=== Paul – participation in Christ ===
The appearance of Jesus to Paul convinced him that Jesus was the risen Lord and Christ, who commissioned him to be an apostle to the Gentiles. According to Newbigin, "Paul presents himself not as the teacher of a new theology but as the messenger commissioned by the authority of the Lord himself to announce a new fact – namely that in the ministry, death and resurrection of Jesus, God has acted decisively to reveal and effect his purpose of redemption for the whole world". The teachings of the apostle Paul form a key element of the Christian tradition and theology. Fundamental to Pauline theology is the connection between Christ's resurrection, and redemption. In 1 Corinthians 15:13–14, 15:17, and 15:20–22, Paul writes:

If there is no resurrection of the dead, then Christ has not been raised; if Christ has not been raised, then our preaching is in vain and your faith is in vain ... If Christ has not been raised, your faith is futile ... But Christ really has been raised from the dead. He is the first of all those who will rise. Death came because of what a man did. Rising from the dead also comes because of what a man did. Because of Adam, all people die. So because of Christ, all will be made alive.

The kerygma of 1 Corinthians 15:3 states that "Christ died for our sins"- The meaning of that kerygma is a matter of debate, and open to multiple interpretations. Traditionally, this kerygma is interpreted as meaning that Jesus's death was an atonement or ransom for, or propitiation or expiation of, God's wrath against humanity because of their sins. With Jesus's death, humanity was freed from this wrath. (Note: David G. Peterson (2009), Atonement in Paul's writing) (Note: Atonement: * Briscoe and Ogilvie (2003): "Paul says that Christ's ransom price is his blood." * Cobb: "The question is whether Paul thought that God sacrificed Jesus to atone for human sins. During the past thousand years, this idea has often been viewed in the Western church as at the heart of Christianity, and many of those who uphold it have appealed to Paul as its basis ... In fact, the word 'atonement' is lacking in many standard translations. The King James Translation uses 'propitiation', and the Revised Standard Version uses 'expiation.' The American Translation reads: 'For God showed him publicly dying as a sacrifice of reconciliation to be taken advantage of through faith.' The Good News Bible renders the meaning as: 'God offered him, so that by his sacrificial death he should become the means by which people's sins are forgiven through their faith in him.' Despite this variety, and the common avoidance of the word 'atonement', all these translations agree with the New Revised Standard Version in suggesting that God sacrificed Jesus so that people could be reconciled to God through faith. All thereby support the idea that is most directly formulated by the use of the word 'atonement.'" (Note: John B. Cobb, Did Paul Teach the Doctrine of the Atonement?)) In the classical Protestant understanding, which has dominated the understanding of Paul's writings, humans partake in this salvation by faith in Jesus Christ; this faith is a grace given by God, and people are justified by God through Jesus Christ and faith in Him.

More recent scholarship has raised several concerns regarding these interpretations. According to E. P. Sanders, who initiated the so-called "New Perspective on Paul", Paul saw the faithful redeemed by participation in Jesus's death and rising. Though "Jesus's death substituted for that of others and thereby freed believers from sin and guilt", a metaphor derived from "ancient sacrificial theology", (Note: E. P. Sanders, Saint Paul, the Apostle, Encyclopedia Britannica) (Note: According to The Jewish Encyclopedia (1906), "The Mishnah says that sins are expiated (1) by sacrifice, (2) by repentance at death or on Yom Kippur, (3) in the case of the lighter transgressions of the positive or negative precepts, by repentance at any time ... The graver sins, according to Rabbi, are apostasy, heretical interpretation of the Torah, and non-circumcision (Yoma 86a). The atonement for sins between a man and his neighbour is an ample apology (Yoma 85b)." (Note: The Jewish Encyclopedia, "SIN") The Jewish Virtual Library writes: "Another important concept [of sacrifices] is the element of substitution. The idea is that the thing being offered is a substitute for the person making the offering, and the things that are done to the offering are things that should have been done to the person offering. The offering is in some sense 'punished' in place of the offerer. It is interesting to note that whenever the subject of Karbanot is addressed in the Torah, the name of G-d used is the four-letter name indicating G-d's mercy." (Note: Jeewish Virtual Library, "Jewish Practices & Rituals: Sacrifices and Offerings (Karbanot)") The Jewish Encyclopedia further writes: "Most efficacious seemed to be the atoning power of suffering experienced by the righteous during the Exile. This is the idea underlying the description of the suffering servant of God in Isa. liii. 4, 12, Hebr. ... of greater atoning power than all the Temple sacrifices was the suffering of the elect ones who were to be servants and witnesses of the Lord (Isa. xlii. 1–4, xlix. 1–7, l. 6). This idea of the atoning power of the suffering and death of the righteous finds expression also in IV Macc. vi. 27, xvii. 21–23; M. Ḳ. 28a; Pesiḳ. xxvii. 174b; Lev. R. xx.; and formed the basis of Paul's doctrine of the atoning blood of Christ (Rom. iii. 25)." (Note: The Jewish Encyclopedia (1906), "Atonement")) the essence of Paul's writing is not in the "legal terms" regarding the expiation of sin, but the act of "participation in Christ through dying and rising with him". (Note: Jordan Cooper: "Sanders sees Paul's motifs of salvation as more participationist than juristic. The reformation overemphasized the judicial categories of forgiveness and escape from condemnation, while ignoring the real heart of salvation, which is a mystical participation in Christ. Paul shows this in his argument in his first epistle to the Corinthians when arguing against sexual immorality. It is wrong because it affects one's union with Christ by uniting himself to a prostitute. Sin is not merely the violation of an abstract law. This participationist language is also used in Corinthians in the discussion of the Lord's Supper wherein one participates in the body and blood of Christ." (Note: Jordan Cooper, E.P. Sanders and the New Perspective on Paul)) According to Sanders, "those who are baptized into Christ are baptized into his death, and thus they escape the power of sin ... he died so that the believers may die with him and consequently live with him". Just as Christians share in Jesus's death in baptism, so they will share in his resurrection. James F. McGrath notes that Paul "prefers to use the language of participation. One died for all, so that all died. This is not only different from substitution, it is the opposite of it".

Paul insists that salvation is received by the grace of God; according to Sanders, this insistence is in line with Judaism of c. 200 BC – c. AD 200, which saw God's covenant with Israel as an act of grace of God. Observance of the Law is needed to maintain the covenant, but the covenant is not earned by observing the Law, but by the grace of God.

=== Church Fathers – atonement ===
The Apostolic Fathers discussed the death and resurrection of Jesus, including Ignatius (50–115), Polycarp (69–155), and Justin Martyr (100–165). The understanding of the Greek Fathers of the death and resurrection of Jesus as an atonement is the "classic paradigm" of the Church Fathers, who developed the themes found in the New Testament.

During the first millennium AD, the ransom theory of atonement was the dominant metaphor, both in eastern and western Christianity, until it was replaced in the west by Anselmus's satisfaction theory of atonement. The ransom theory of atonement says that Christ liberated humanity from slavery to sin and Satan, and thus death, by giving his own life as a ransom sacrifice to Satan, swapping the life of the perfect (Jesus), for the lives of the imperfect (humans). It entails the idea that God deceived the devil, and that Satan, or death, had "legitimate rights" over sinful souls in the afterlife, due to the fall of man and inherited sin.

The ransom theory was first clearly enunciated by Irenaeus (c. 130–c. 202), who was an outspoken critic of Gnosticism, but borrowed ideas from their dualistic worldview. In this worldview, humankind is under the power of the Demiurge, a lesser God who has created the world. Yet, humans have a spark of the true divine nature within them, which can be liberated by gnosis (knowledge) of this divine spark. This knowledge is revealed by the Logos, "the very mind of the supreme God", who entered the world in the person of Jesus. Nevertheless, the Logos could not simply undo the power of the Demiurge, and had to hide his real identity, appearing as a physical form, thereby misleading the Demiurge, and liberating humankind. In Irenaeus' writings, the Demiurge is replaced by the devil, while Justin Martyr had already equated Jesus and the Logos.

Origen (184–253) introduced the idea that the devil held legitimate rights over humans, who were bought free by the blood of Christ. He also introduced the notion that the devil was deceived in thinking that he could master the human soul.

=== Late Antiquity and early Middle Ages ===
Following the conversion of Constantine and the Edict of Milan in 313, the ecumenical councils of the 4th, 5th and 6th centuries, that focused on Christology, helped shape the Christian understanding of the redemptive nature of the resurrection, and influenced both the development of its iconography and its use within Liturgy.

Belief in bodily resurrection was a constant note of the Christian church in antiquity. Augustine of Hippo accepted it at the time of his conversion in 386. Augustine defended resurrection, and argued that given that Christ has risen, there is resurrection of the dead. Moreover, he argued that the death and resurrection of Jesus was for the salvation of man, stating: "to achieve each resurrection of ours, the savior paid with his single life, and he pre-enacted and presented his one and only one by way of sacrament and by way of model".

The 5th-century theology of Theodore of Mopsuestia provides an insight into the development of the Christian understanding of the redemptive nature of resurrection. The crucial role of the sacraments in the mediation of salvation was well accepted at the time. In Theodore's representation of the Eucharist, the sacrificial and salvific elements are combined in the "One who saved us and delivered us by the sacrifice of Himself". Theodore's interpretation of the Eucharistic rite is directed towards the triumph over the power of death brought about by the resurrection.

The emphasis on the salvific nature of the resurrection continued in Christian theology in the next centuries, e.g., in the 8th century Saint John of Damascus wrote that: "... When he had freed those who were bound from the beginning of time, Christ returned again from among the dead, having opened for us the way to resurrection" and Christian iconography of the ensuing years represented that concept.

=== Roman Catholic Church ===
The resurrection of Jesus is the good news that the Roman Catholic Church proclaims: "the revelation in Jesus Christ of God's mercy to sinners". The importance of the resurrection is connected to the incarnation of Jesus: by becoming incarnate God has assumed every human unto himself, for his humanity is made of every human (just as a temple is made of stones), and by resurrecting himself God has also resurrected every human.

By rising from the dead, Jesus is the beginning of the resurrection of the dead on Judgment Day and the beginning of the spiritual resurrection (justification or "new life") of sinners, since Jesus is the first human resurrected by God, as the head of the human race as God incarnate, whereby in him all people have already been resurrected and justified, since his resurrection is the principle of the resurrection of the dead and justification of sinners.

The resurrection is a historical yet transcendent event. The historical resurrection transcends spacetime by affecting every human, from Adam and Eve's repentance after the fall, to the purported resurrection of Lazarus (who returned to an earthly life), to the conversion of Saint Paul, to the resurrection of the dead on Judgment Day.

By rising from the dead, Jesus shows what the risen bodies of the saints (i.e., justified sinners) will be like. From the moment of his incarnation, Jesus's soul experienced the beatific vision, because he is true God and true man, and from the moment of his resurrection Jesus's body shared in his soul's experience of the beatific vision. At the resurrection, Jesus's whole humanity was deified, and so, shares in the personal mode of existence of the Second Person of the Trinity.

Deification includes four properties: impassibility (freedom from evil, i.e., temptation, sin, suffering, error, inconvenience, boredom, Satan, and death), subtility (freedom from restraint by the laws of science, which includes shapeshifting, teleportation, time travel, control over nature, and superhuman senses and prowess), agility (one's body will not act faster than one's mind or give in to emotion and impulse, for the body will be as obedient to the soul as the soul is to God), and clarity (resplendent beauty and the five crowns).

=== Present day ===
In contemporary theology, many scholars interpret the resurrection of Jesus less as a strictly historical or physical event and more as a theological or existential expression of renewal, faith, and continuing religious meaning. Some New Testament scholars, including John Painter and Martin de Boer, identify a motif in resurrection traditions that link them to biblical creation themes and to Paul’s writings about spiritual transformation. Willi Marxsen and others argue that the Gospel resurrection narratives emphasize the continued significance of Jesus’ message rather than providing verifiable historical descriptions. Similarly, theologians such as Andries van Aarde interpret resurrection belief as part of a broader historical development of ideas about renewal. Scholars such as Rudolf Bultmann and Hans Conzelmann argue that literal claims of resurrection is less important to Christianity than claims about salvation through Jesus. These perspectives, alongside interpretations such as those summarized by Marcus Borg, often present the resurrection as symbolizing moral transformation, divine love, and the ongoing relevance of Jesus’ teachings within modern Christian thought.

Thorwald Lorenzen finds "a strange silence about the resurrection in many pulpits". He writes that among some Christians, ministers and professors, it seems to have become "a cause for embarrassment or the topic of apologetics". The idea of a bodily resurrection remains controversial.

According to psychiatrist and author Adrian Warnock, many Christians neglect the resurrection because of their understandable preoccupation with the Cross.

== Easter ==
Easter is the preeminent Christian feast that celebrates the resurrection of Jesus, and according to Susan J. White is "clearly the earliest Christian festival". According to James Dunn, "In Easter we celebrate man become God ... that in the death and resurrection of Christ God has broken the stranglehold of human selfishness, has proved the enduring and conquering strength of divine love". According to Thorwald Lorenzen, the first Easter led to a shift in emphasis from faith "in God" to faith "in Christ". According to Raymond Harfgus Taylor, Easter "focuses upon the consummation of the redemptive act of God in the death/resurrection of Jesus Christ".

Easter is linked to the Passover and Exodus from Egypt recorded in the Old Testament through the Last Supper and crucifixion that preceded the resurrection. According to the New Testament, Jesus gave the Passover meal a new meaning, as he prepared himself and his disciples for his death in the upper room during the Last Supper. He identified the loaf of bread and cup of wine as his body soon to be sacrificed and his blood soon to be shed. 1 Corinthians 5:7 states, "Get rid of the old yeast that you may be a new batch without yeast – as you really are. For Christ, our Passover lamb, has been sacrificed"; this refers to the Passover requirement to have no yeast in the house and to the allegory of Jesus as the Paschal lamb. The Jewish feast of First-fruits is regarded by dispensationalists as foreshadowing its fulfilment in the resurrection of Jesus based on 1 Corinthians 15:20 "But Christ has indeed been raised from the dead, the firstfruits of those who have fallen asleep".

Whilst the fact that the crucifixion is remembered on Good Friday and Easter celebrated two days later may appear to contradict biblical accounts that Jesus rose on the third day, in Semitic tradition any part of a 24-hour period could be called "a day and a night".

== In Christian art ==
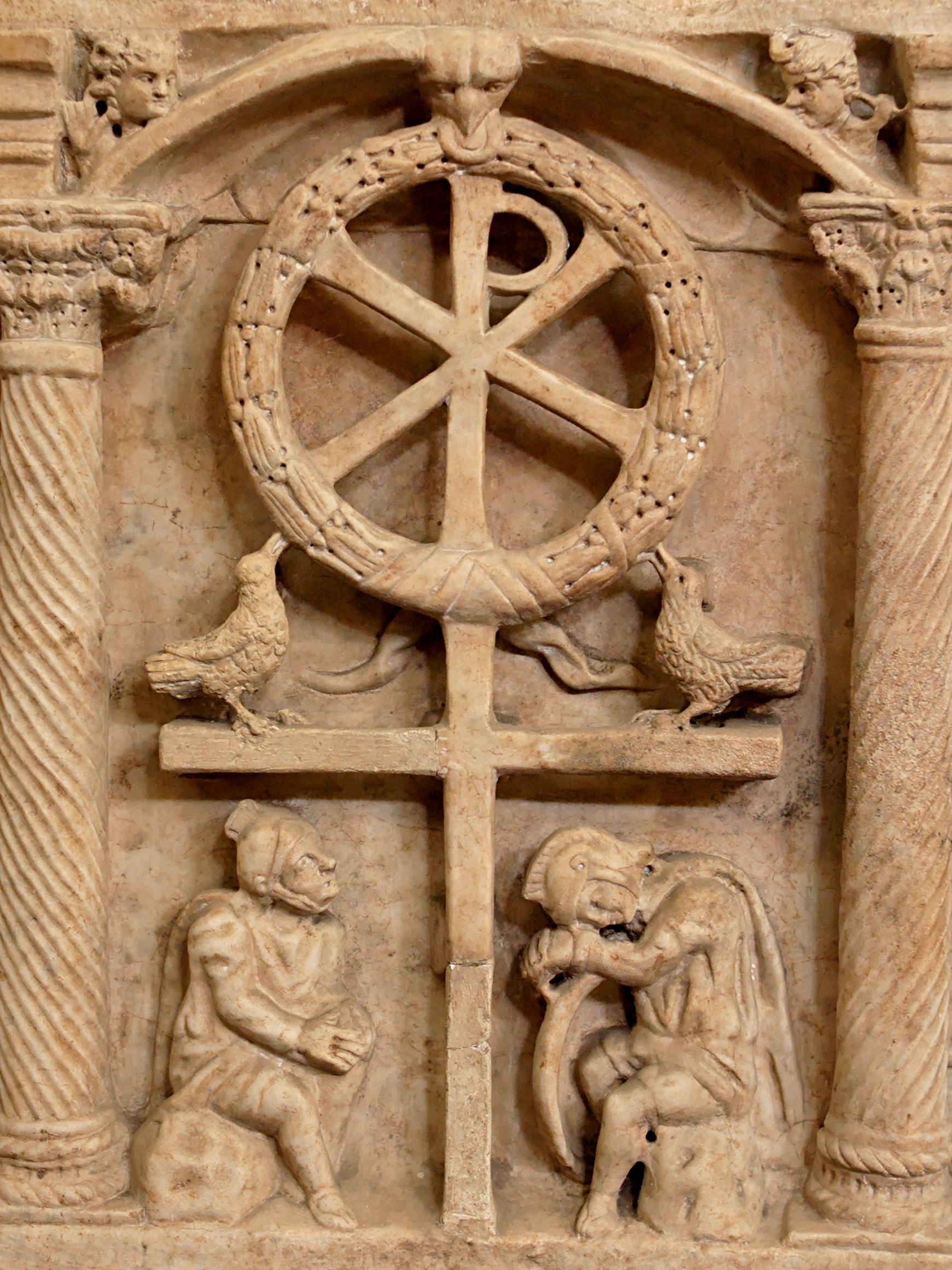
The Chi Rho with a wreath symbolizing the victory of the Resurrection, above Roman soldiers, c. 350

In the Catacombs of Rome, artists indirectly hinted at the resurrection by using images from the Old Testament such as the fiery furnace and Daniel in the lions' den. Depictions prior to the 7th century generally showed secondary events such as the Myrrhbearers at the tomb of Jesus to convey the concept of the resurrection. An early symbol of the resurrection was the wreathed Chi Rho (Greek letters representing the word "Khristos" or "Christ"), whose origin traces to the victory of emperor Constantine I at the Battle of the Milvian Bridge in 312, which he attributed to the use of a cross on the shields of his soldiers. Constantine used the Chi Rho on his standard and his coins showed a labarum with the Chi Rho killing a serpent.

The use of a wreath around the Chi Rho symbolizes the victory of the resurrection over death, and is an early visual representation of the connection between the crucifixion of Jesus and his triumphal resurrection, as seen in the 4th-century sarcophagus of Domitilla in Rome. Here, in the wreathed Chi Rho the death and Resurrection of Christ are shown as inseparable, and the Resurrection is not merely a happy ending tucked at the end of the life of Christ on earth. Given the use of similar symbols on the Roman military banner, this depiction also conveyed another victory, namely that of the Christian faith: the Roman soldiers who had once arrested Jesus and marched him to Calvary now walked under the banner of a resurrected Christ.

The cosmic significance of the resurrection in Western theology goes back to Saint Ambrose, who in the 4th century said that "The universe rose again in Him, the heaven rose again in Him, the earth rose again in Him, for there shall be a new heaven and a new earth". This theme developed gradually in the West, later than in the East where the resurrection had been linked from an earlier date to redemption and the renewal and rebirth of the whole world. In art, this was symbolized by combining the depictions of the resurrection with the Harrowing of Hell in icons and paintings. A good example is from the Chora Church in Istanbul, where John the Baptist, Solomon and other figures are also present, depicting that Christ was not alone in the resurrection. The depiction sequence at the 10th-century Hosios Loukas shows Christ as he pulls Adam from his tomb, followed by Eve, signifying the salvation of humanity after the resurrection.

=== Gallery of art ===
For a Commons gallery see: Resurrection gallery

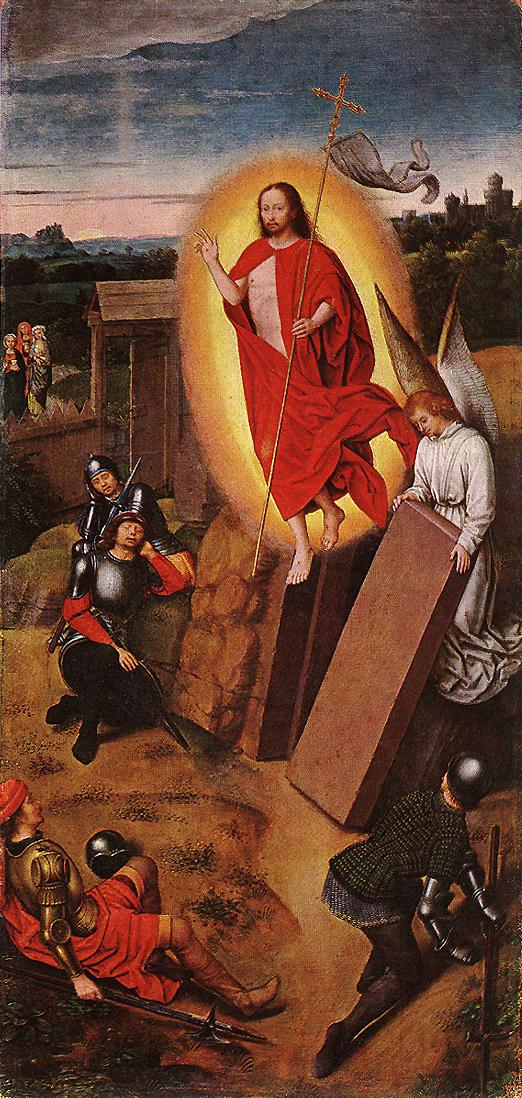
Resurrection of Christ, by Hans Memling, 15th century

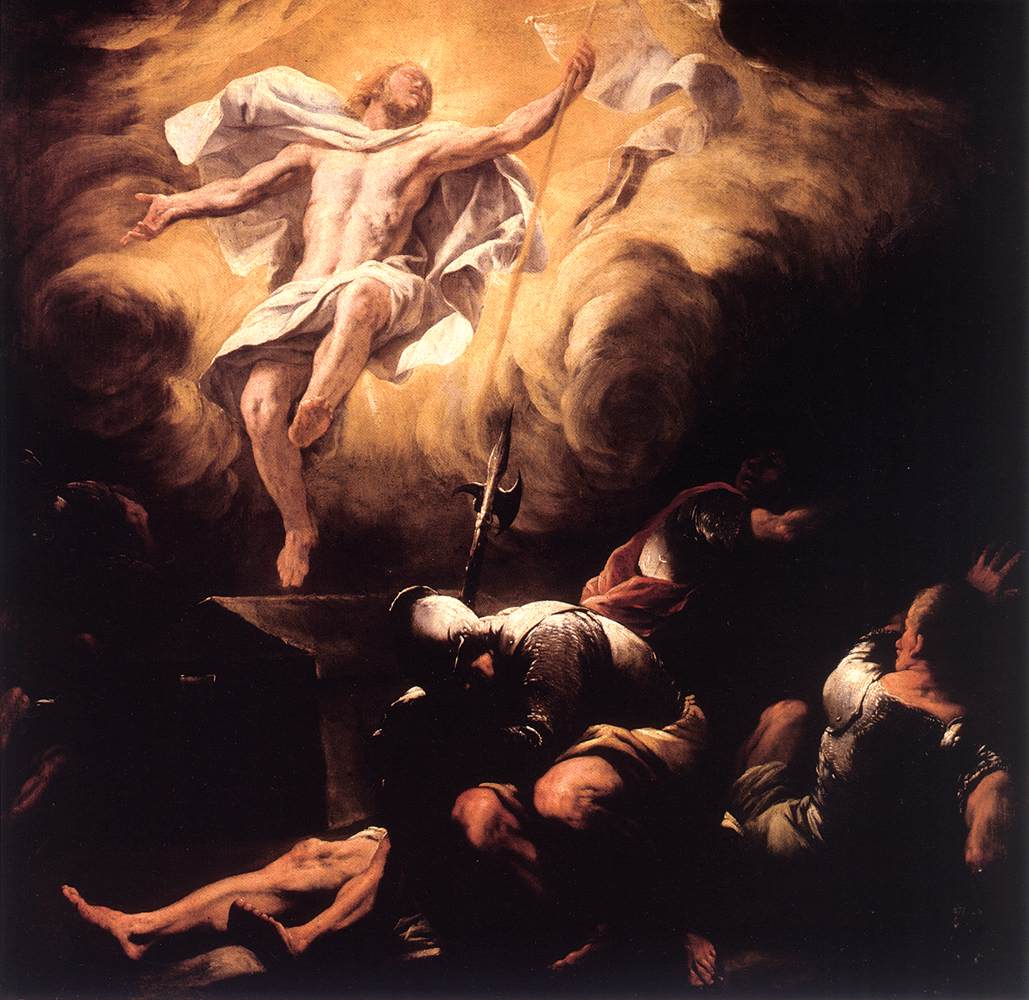
Resurrection, by Luca Giordano, after 1665

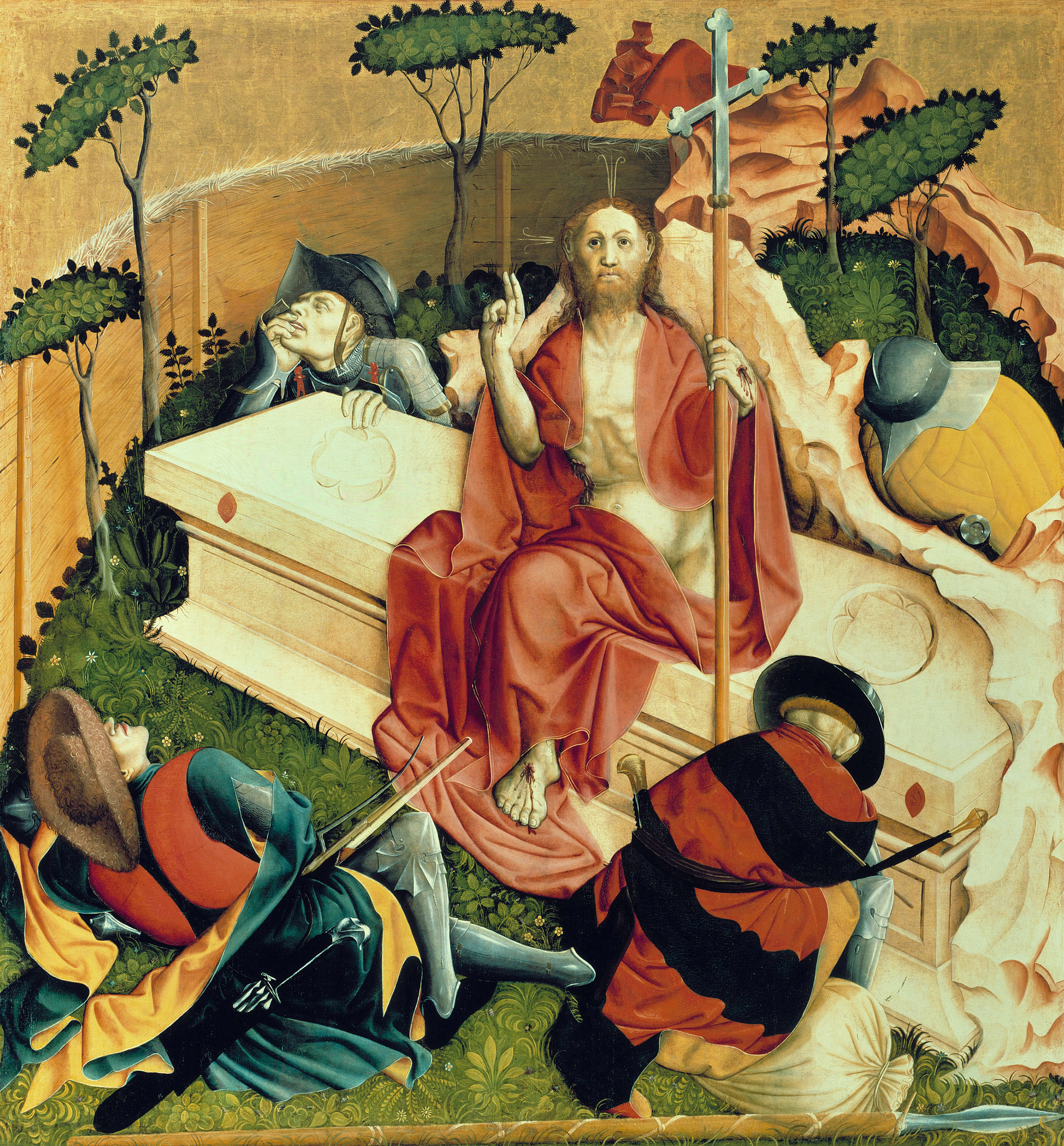
Resurrection, by Hans Multscher, 1437

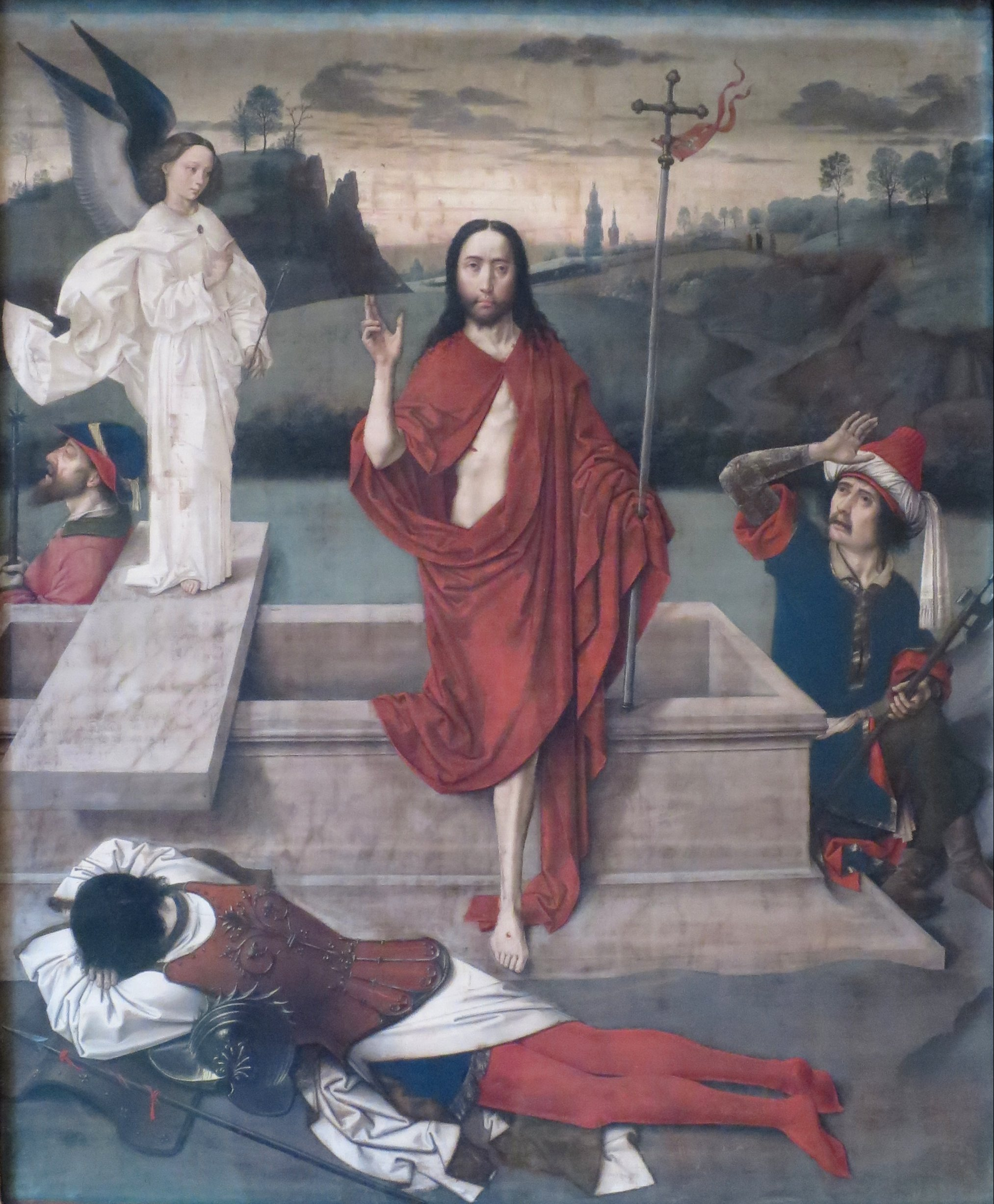
Resurrection, by Dieric Bouts, c. 1450–1460

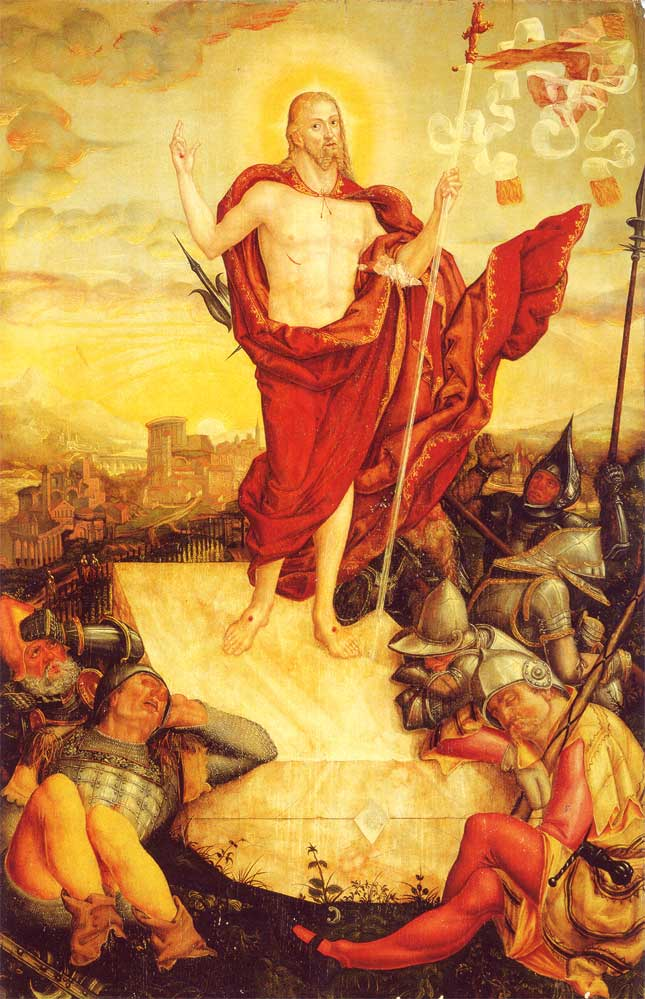
Der Auferstanden, by Lucas Cranach, 1558

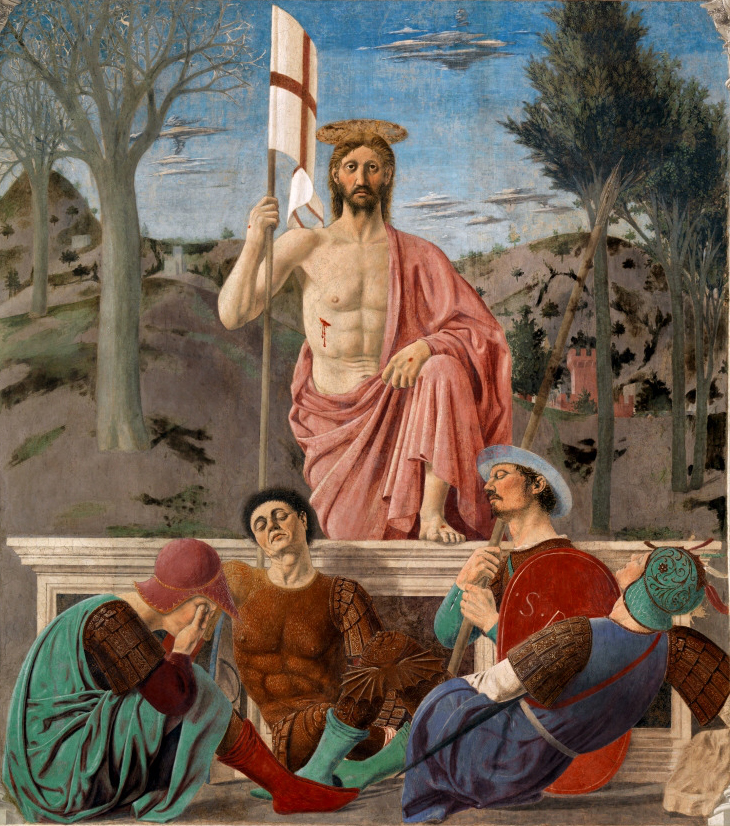
The Resurrection, by Piero della Francesca, 15th century

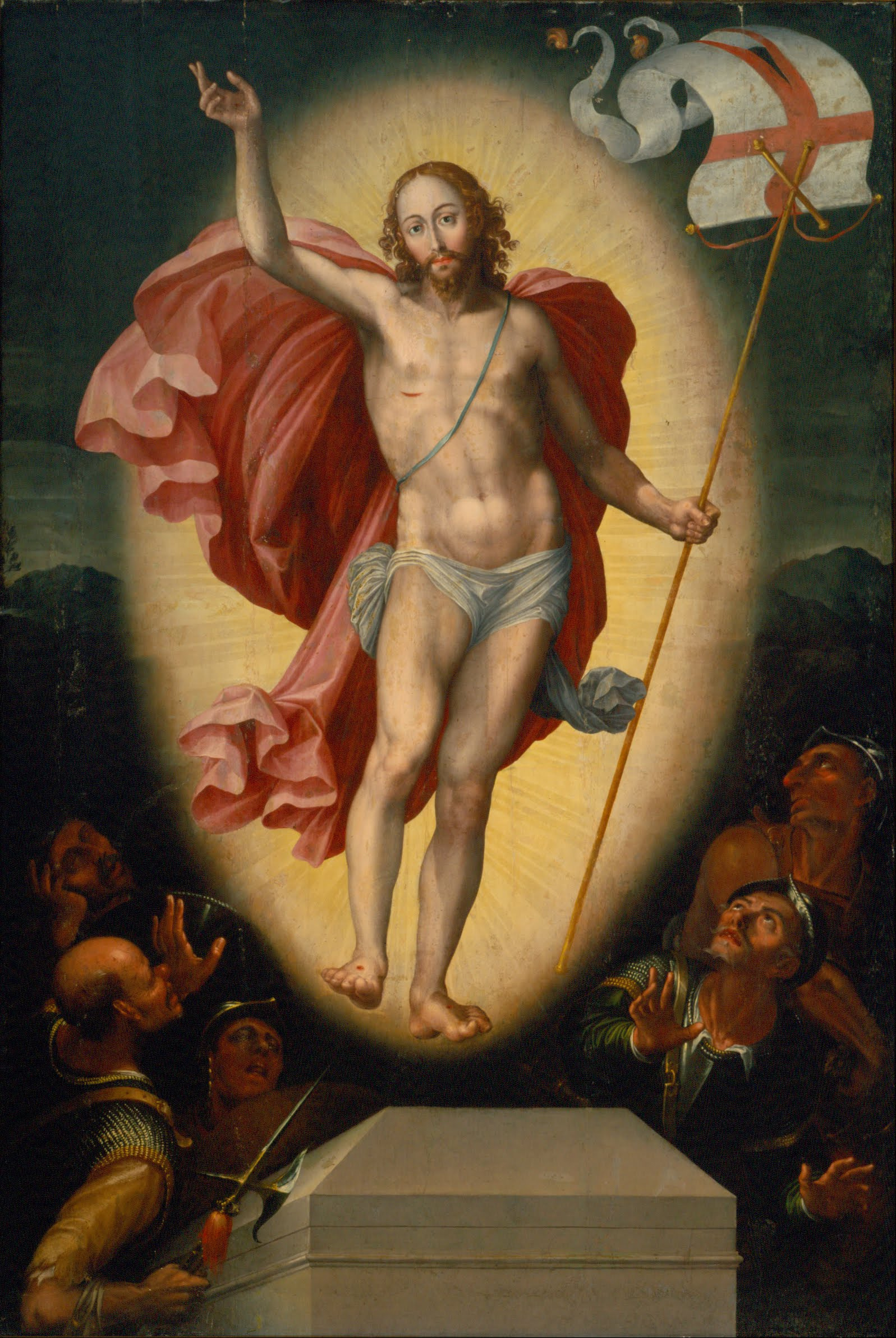
The Resurrection of Christ, Alonso López de Herrera, c. 1625

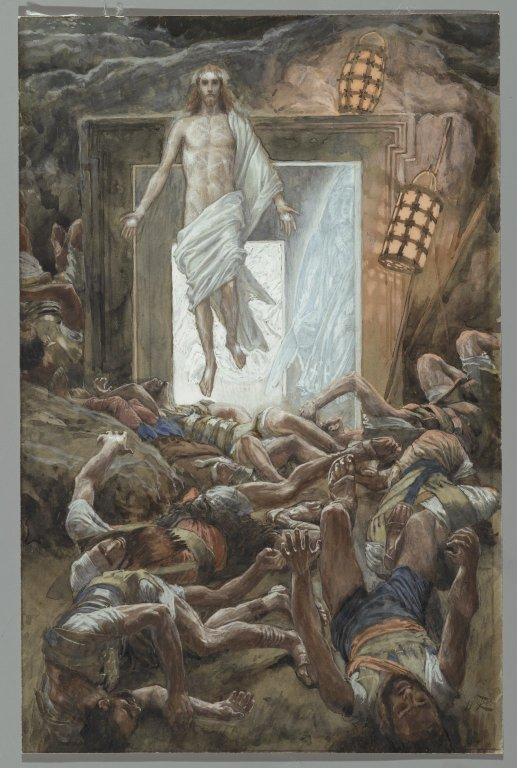
The Resurrection (La Résurrection), by James Tissot, c. 1890, Brooklyn Museum

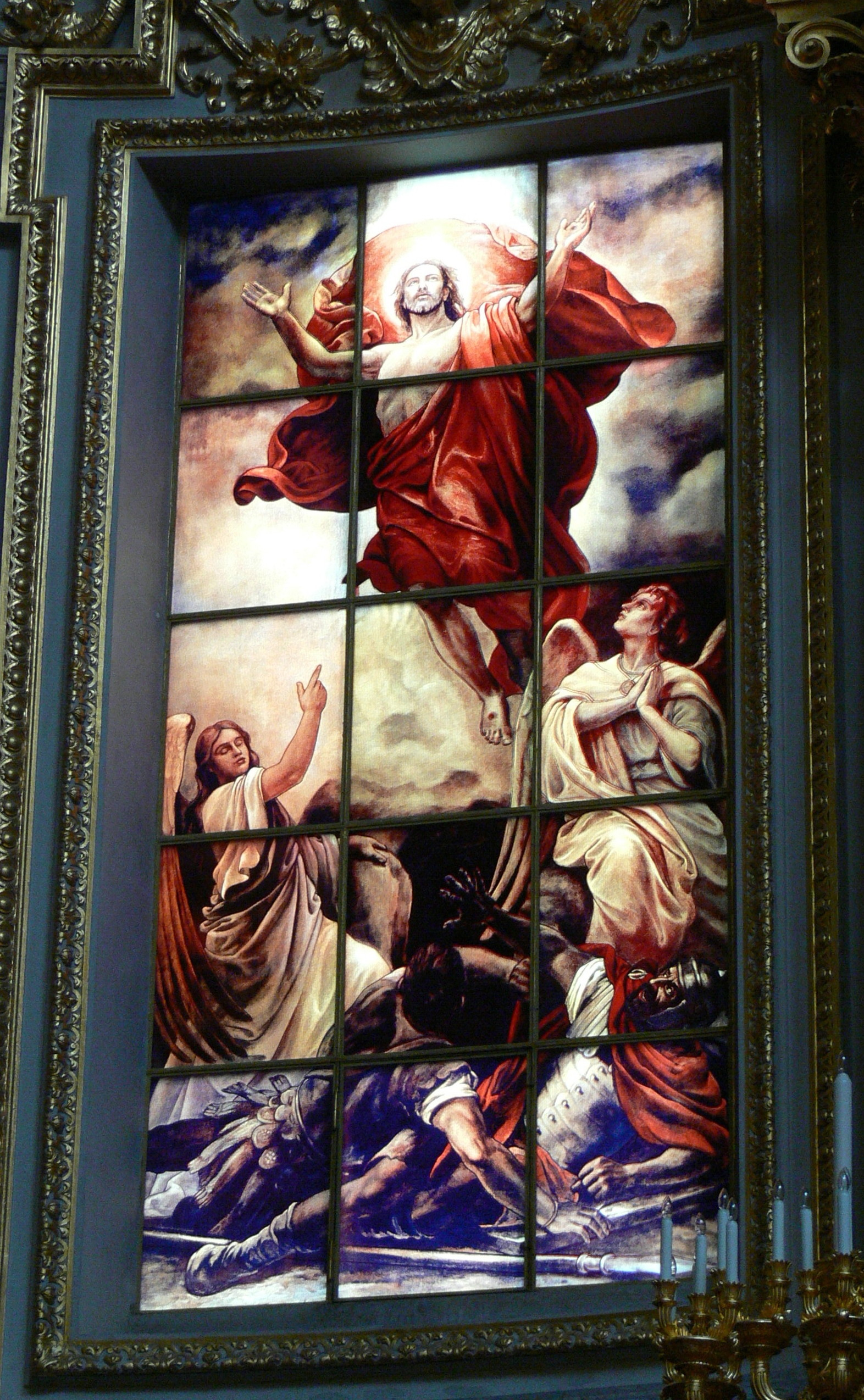
Resurrection of Jesus, by Anton von Werner, Berlin Cathedral

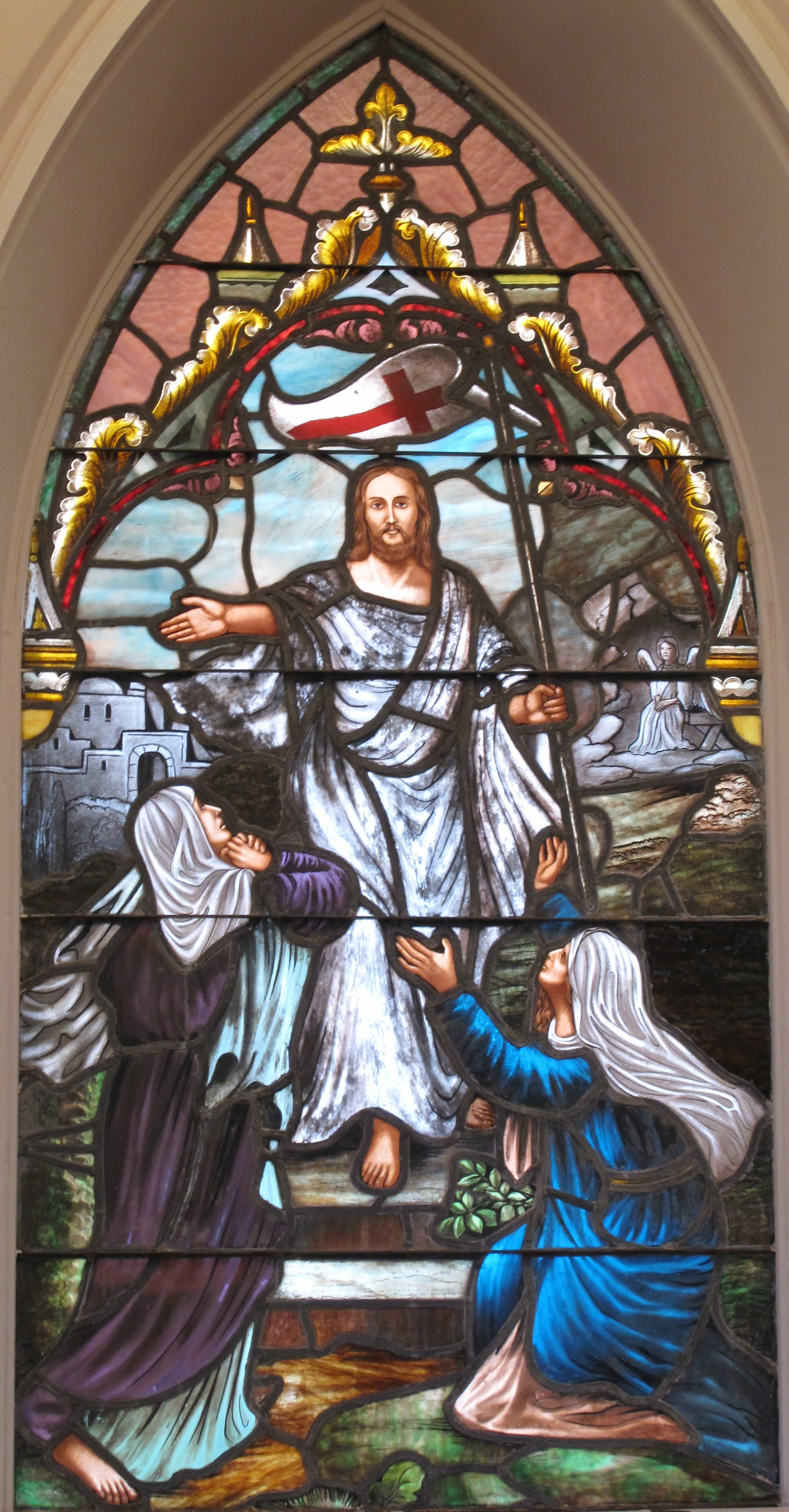
Stained glass depiction with two Marys, Lutheran Church, South Carolina

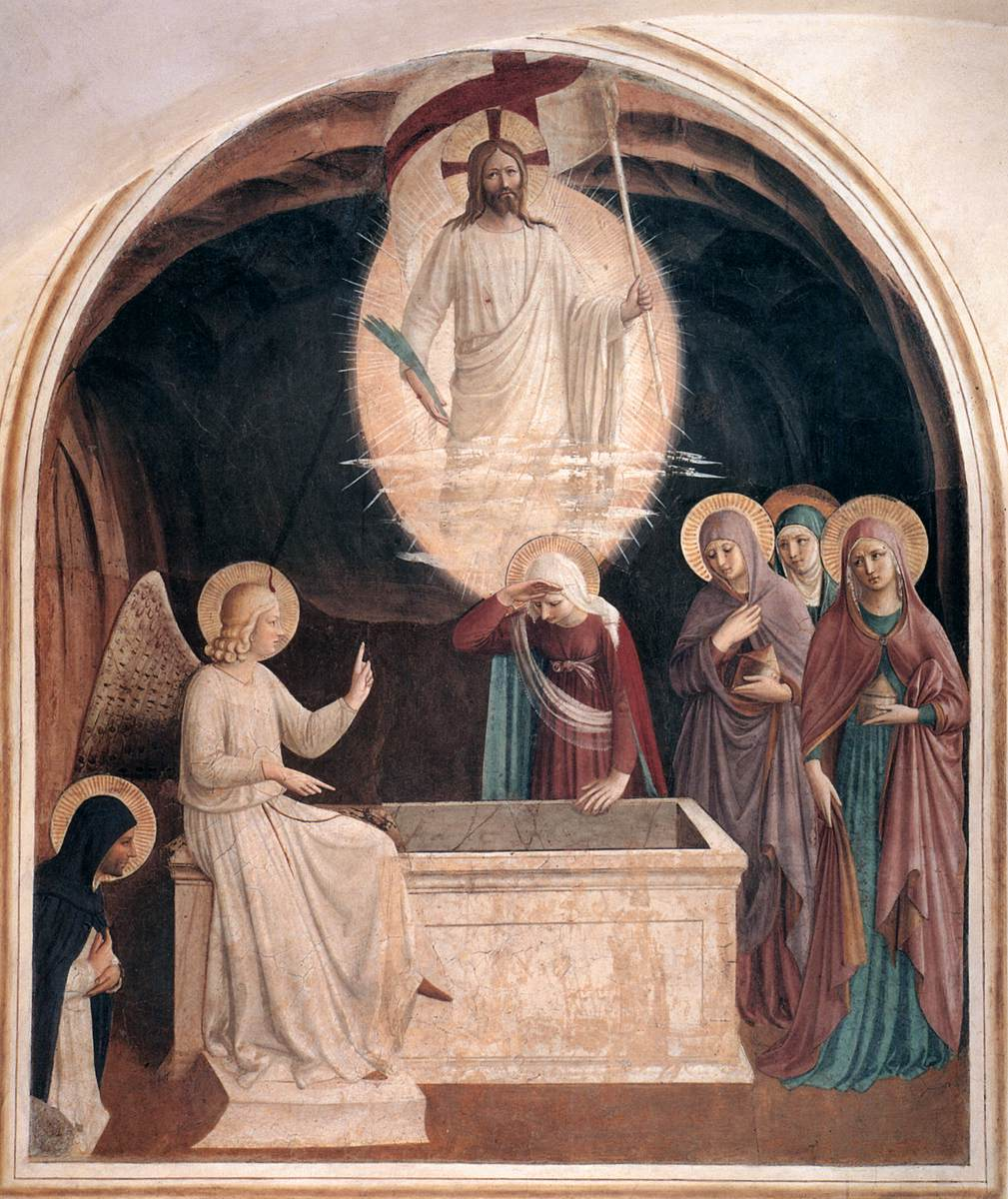
Women at the empty tomb, by Fra Angelico, 1437–1446

== Relics ==
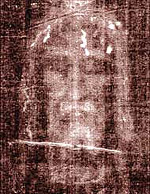
Secondo Pia's 1898 negative of the image on the Shroud of Turin has an appearance suggesting a positive image. It is used as part of the devotion to the Holy Face of Jesus.

The resurrection of Jesus has long been central to the Christian faith and appears within diverse elements of the Christian tradition, from feasts to artistic depictions to religious relics. In Christian teachings, the sacraments derive their saving power from the passion and resurrection of Christ, upon which the salvation of the world entirely depends.

An example of the interweaving of the teachings on the resurrection with Christian relics is the application of the concept of "miraculous image formation" at the moment of resurrection to the Shroud of Turin. Christian authors have stated the belief that the body around whom the shroud was wrapped was not merely human, but divine, and that the image on the shroud was miraculously produced at the moment of resurrection. Quoting Pope Paul VI's statement that the shroud is "the wonderful document of His Passion, Death and Resurrection, written for us in letters of blood" author Antonio Cassanelli argues that the shroud is a deliberate divine record of the five stages of the Passion of Christ, created at the moment of resurrection.

== Views of other religions ==
Groups such as Jews, Muslims, Baháʼís, and other non-Christians, as well as some liberal Christians, dispute whether Jesus actually rose from the dead. Arguments over death and resurrection claims occur at many religious debates and interfaith dialogues.

=== Judaism ===
Christianity split from Judaism in the 1st century AD, and the two faiths have differed in their theology since. According to the Toledot Yeshu, the body of Jesus was removed on the same night by a gardener named Juda, after hearing the disciples planned to steal the body of Jesus. However, Toledot Yeshu is not considered either canonical or normative within rabbinic literature. Van Voorst states that Toledot Yeshu is a medieval document set without a fixed form which is "most unlikely" to have reliable information about Jesus. The Blackwell Companion to Jesus states that the Toledot Yeshu has no historical facts as such, and was perhaps created as a tool for warding off conversions to Christianity.

=== Gnostics ===
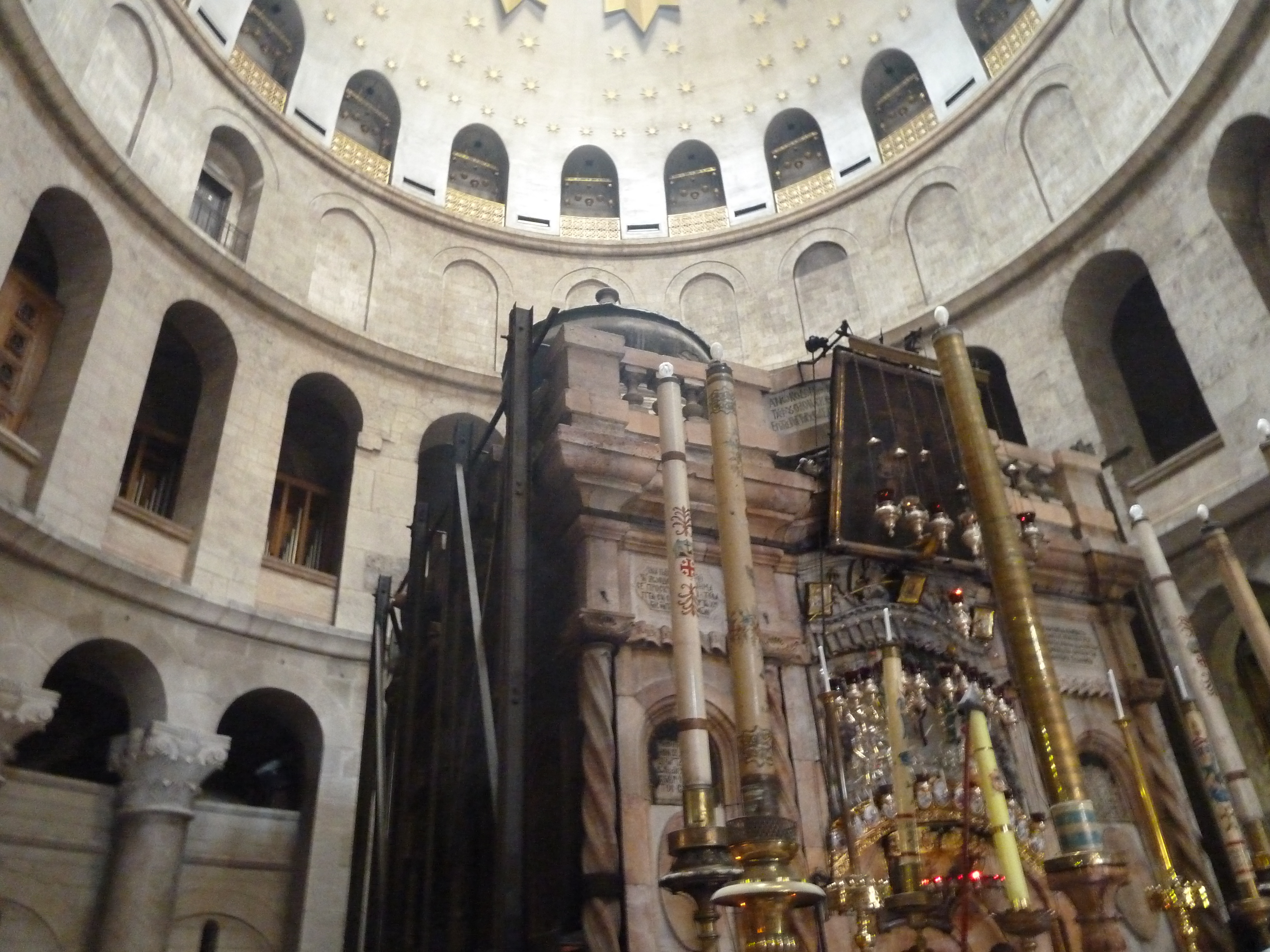
A rotunda in Church of the Holy Sepulchre, called the Anastasis ("Resurrection"), which contains the remains of a rock-cut room that Helena and Macarius identified as the burial site of Jesus

Some Gnostics did not believe in a literal physical resurrection. "For the gnostic any resurrection of the dead was excluded from the outset; the flesh or substance is destined to perish. 'There is no resurrection of the flesh, but only of the soul', say the so-called Archontics, a late gnostic group in Palestine".

=== Islam ===
Muslims believe that ʿĪsā (Jesus) son of Mariam (Mary) was a holy prophet with a divine message. The Islamic perspective is that Jesus was not crucified and will return to the world at the end of times. "But Allāh raised him up to Himself. And Allāh is Ever All-Powerful, All-Wise". The Quran says in Surah An-Nisa [Ch 004: Verse 157] "And because of their saying, 'We killed Messiah ʿĪsā, son of Maryam, the Messenger of Allāh', – but they killed him not, nor crucified him, but it appeared so to them, and those who differ therein are full of doubts".

==== Ahmadiyya ====
Ahmadi Muslims believe that, as Jesus is the Messiah to the Children of Israel his objective was to gather their following. For this reason, Ahmadis believe that Jesus survived the crucifixion, as supported by the Qur'an, as a death on the cross would be a cursed one, supported by the Bible. This belief is held as Jesus had other "sheep" to tend to.

After surviving the crucifixion, Jesus and his mother migrated to another land where he continued his mission.

== See also ==
- Chronology of Jesus
- Divine Mercy Sunday
- Dying-and-rising god
- Jesus in India (book)
- Outline of Jesus
- Swoon hypothesis
- Substitution hypothesis
- Third Nephi
- Tomb of Jesus
  - The ground on which the Church of the Holy Sepulchre stands is venerated by most Christians as Golgotha, the Hill of Calvary, where the New Testament says that Jesus was crucified. This tomb is venerated as the tomb of Christ by the Catholic Church, Eastern Orthodox churches, and Oriental Orthodox churches.
  - The Garden Tomb, discovered in the 19th century, is considered the actual site of Jesus's grave by some Protestant Christians.
  - Talpiot Tomb, discovered in 1980, subject of the controversial 2007 documentary The Lost Tomb of Jesus

== Sources ==
Printed sources

- Allison, Dale C. Jr. (2005). Resurrecting Jesus: The Earliest Christian Tradition and Its Interpreters. New York: T & T Clark International. ISBN 978-0567397454.
- Allison, Dale C. Jr. (2021). The Resurrection of Jesus: Apologetics, Polemics, History. New York: Bloomsbury. ISBN 978-0567697578.
- Allison, Dale C. (2021b). The Resurrection of Jesus: Apologetics, Polemics, History. T&T Clark. ISBN 978-0567697561.
- Aune, David (2013). Jesus, Gospel Tradition and Paul in the Context of Jewish and Greco-Roman Antiquity. Mohr Siebeck. ISBN 978-3161523151.
- Beck, W. David; Licona, Michael R. (2020). Raised on the Third Day: Defending the Historicity of the Resurrection of Jesus. Lexham Press. ISBN 978-1683594321.
- Beilby, James K.; Eddy, Paul R. (2009), The Nature of the Atonement: Four Views, InterVarsity Press
- Bergeron, Joseph W.; Habermas, Gary R. (2015). "The Resurrection of Jesus: A Clinical Review of Psychiatric Hypotheses for the Biblical Story of Easter". Irish Theological Quarterly. 80 (2): 157–72. doi:10.1177/0021140014564555. S2CID 165159439.
- Blomberg, Craig L. (1987), The Historical Reliability of the Gospels, Leicester, UK: Inter-Varsity Press, ISBN 978-0877849926, OCLC 15415029, 2nd ed. 2007
- Bockmuehl, Markus N. A. (2010), The Remembered Peter: In Ancient Reception and Modern Debate, Mohr Siebeck
- Borg, Marcus; Crossan, John Dominic (2006). The Last Week. HarperCollins.
- Boring, M. Eugene (2006), Mark: A Commentary, Presbyterian Publishing Corp, ISBN 978-0664221072
- Briscoe, D. Stuatt; Ogilvie, Lloyd J. (2003), The Preacher's Commentary: Romans Vol. 29, Thomas Nelson
- Brown, R.E. (2008), Witherup, Ronald D. (ed.), Christ in the Gospels of the Liturgical Year, Paulist Press, ISBN 978-0814635315
- Brown, R.E. (1973), The Virginal Conception and Bodily Resurrection of Jesus, Paulist Press, ISBN 978-0809117680
- Bultmann, Rudolf (1963), The History of the Synoptic Tradition, translated by John Marsh, Oxford: Basil Blackwell
- Burkett, Delbert (2002), An introduction to the New Testament and the origins of Christianity, Cambridge University Press, ISBN 978-0521007207
- Casey, Maurice (2010). Jesus of Nazareth: An Independent Historian's Account of His Life and Teaching. A&C Black. ISBN 978-0567645173.
- Charry, Ellen T. (1999), By the Renewing of Your Minds: The Pastoral Function of Christian Doctrine, Oxford University Press
- Chester, Andrew (2007), Messiah and Exaltation: Jewish Messianic and Visionary Traditions and New Testament Christology, Mohr Siebeck, ISBN 978-3161490910
- Collins, Adela Yarbro (2009), "Ancient Notions of Transferal and Apotheosis", in Seim, Turid Karlsen; Økland, Jorunn (eds.), Metamorphoses: Resurrection, Body and Transformative Practices in Early Christianity, Walter de Gruyter, ISBN 978-3110202991
- De Conick, April D. (2006), "What Is Early Christian and Jewish Mysticism?", in De Conick, April D. (ed.), Paradise Now: Essays on Early Jewish and Christian Mysticism, SBL, ISBN 978-1589832572
- Cotter, Wendy (2001), "Greco-Roman Apotheosis Traditions and the Resurrection in Matthew", in Thompson, William G. (ed.), The Gospel of Matthew in Current Study, Eerdmans, ISBN 978-0802846730
- Crossan, John Dominic (2009). Jesus: A Revolutionary Biography.
- Cook, John Granger (January 2017). "Resurrection in Paganism and the Question of an Empty Tomb in 1 Corinthians 15". New Testament Studies. 63 (1): 56–75. doi:10.1017/S002868851600028X.
- Dijkhuizen, Petra (2011). "Buried Shamefully: Historical Reconstruction of Jesus' Burial and Tomb". Neotestamentica. 45 (1): 115–29.
- Donaldson, Terence L. (1997), Paul and the Gentiles: Remapping the Apostle's Convictional World, Fortress Press
- Dunn, James D.G. (1985), The Evidence for Jesus, Westminster John Knox Press, ISBN 978-0664246983
- Dunn, James D.G. (1997), Jesus and the Spirit: A Study of the Religious and Charismatic Experience of Jesus and the First Christians as Reflected in the New Testament, Eerdmans
- Dunn, James D.G. (2003), Christology in the Making: A New Testament Inquiry into the Origins of the Doctrine of the Incarnation, Hymns Ancient and Modern Ltd
- Dunn, James D.G. (2003b), Jesus Remembered: Christianity in the Making, Volume 1, Wm. B. Eerdmans Publishing
- Dunn, James D.G. (2006), Unity and Diversity in the New Testament (3rd ed.), scm press
- Dunn, James D.G. (2009), Beginning from Jerusalem: Christianity in the Making, Eerdmans
- Ehrman, Bart D. (2003), Lost Christianities: The Battles for Scripture and the Faiths We Never Knew, Oxford University Press, ISBN 978-0199727124
- Ehrman, Bart (2014), How Jesus Became God. The Exaltation of a Jewish Preacher from Galilea, Harperone
- Elledge, Casey D. (2017), Resurrection of the Dead in Early Judaism, 200 BCE–CE 200, Oxford University Press, ISBN 978-0191082795
- Endsjø, D. (2009), Greek Resurrection Beliefs and the Success of Christianity, Springer, ISBN 978-0230622562
- Evans, Craig (2005). "Jewish Burial Traditions and the resurrection of jesus". JSHJ 3.2 (2005).
- Fredriksen, Paula (2008), From Jesus to Christ: The Origins of the New Testament Images of Jesus, Yale University Press, ISBN 978-0300164107
- Habermas, Gary (2005). "Resurrection Research From 1975 to the Present: What are Critical Scholars Saying?". Journal for the Study of the Historical Jesus. 3 (2): 135–53. doi:10.1177/1476869005058192. S2CID 162213884.
- Habermas, Gary (2024). On the Resurrection, Volume 1: Evidences. B&H Publishing Group. ISBN 978-1087778617.
- Hengel, Martin (1977). Crucifixion in the Ancient World and the Folly of the Message of the Cross. Fortress Press. ISBN 978-0800612689.
- Hultgren, Arland J. (2011), "Paul's Christology and his Mission to the Gentiels", in Burke, Trevor J.; Rosner, Brian S. (eds.), Paul as Missionary: Identity, Activity, Theology, and Practice, Bloomsbury Publishing
- Hurtado, Larry W. (2005) [2003], Lord Jesus Christ: Devotion to Jesus in Earliest Christianity, Eerdmans, ISBN 978-0802831675
- Koester, Helmut (2000), Introduction to the New Testament, Vol. 2: History and Literature of Early Christianity, Walter de Gruyter
- Kloppenborg, John (1978). "An Analysis of the Pre-Pauline Formula 1 Cor 15: 3b-5 In Light of Some Recent Literature". The Catholic Biblical Quarterly. 40 (3): 351–67. JSTOR 43715560.
- Lehtipuu, Outi (2015), Debates Over the Resurrection of the Dead: Constructing Early Christian Identity, Oxford University Press, ISBN 978-0198724810
- Leman, Johan (2015), Van totem tot verrezen Heer. Een historisch-antropologisch verhaal, Pelckmans
- Licona, Michael R (2010). The Resurrection of Jesus: A New Historiographical Approach. Inter-Varsity Press. ISBN 978-1789740196.
- Loke, Andrew Ter Ern (2017), The Origin of Divine Christology, vol. 169, Cambridge University Press, ISBN 978-1108191425
- Lorenzen, Thorwald (2003), Resurrection, Discipleship, Justice: Affirming the Resurrection of Jesus Christ Today, Macon, Georgia: Smyth & Helwys
- Lüdemann, Gerd; Özen, Alf (1996), De opstanding van Jezus. Een historische benadering (Was mit Jesus wirklich geschah. Die Auferstehung historisch betrachtet / The Resurrection of Christ: A Historical Inquiry), The Have/Averbode
- Mack, Burton L. (1995) [1995], Who Wrote the New Testament? The Making of the Christian Myth
- Mack, Burton L. (1997) [1995], Wie schreven het Nieuwe Testament werkelijk? Feiten, mythen en motieven. (Who Wrote the New Testament? The Making of the Christian Myth), Uitgeverij Ankh-Hermes bv
- Magness, Jodi (2005). "Ossuaries and the Burials of Jesus and James". Journal of Biblical Literature. 124 (1): 121–54. doi:10.2307/30040993. ISSN 0021-9231. JSTOR 30040993.
- Mason, Steve (2001), Flavius Josephus on the Pharisees: A Composition-Critical Study, BRILL
- McCane, Byron (2003). Roll Back the Stone: Death and Burial in the World of Jesus. A&C Black.
- Mettinger, Tryggve (2001). The Riddle of Resurrection. Almqvist & Wiksell International.
- Netland, Harold (2001), Encountering Religious Pluralism: The Challenge to Christian Faith & Mission, InterVarsity Press
- Newbigin, Lesslie (1989), The Gospel in a Pluralist Society, Eerdmans, ISBN 2825409715
- Neufeld (1964), The Earliest Christian Confessions, Grand Rapids: Eerdmans
- Novakovic, Lidija (2014), Raised from the Dead According to Scripture: The Role of the Old Testament in the Early Christian Interpretations of Jesus' Resurrection, A&C Black
- Oxenham, Henry (1865), The Catholic Doctrine of the Atonement, Longman, Green, Longman, Roberts, and Green
- Pagels, Elaine (2005), De Gnostische Evangelien (The Gnostic Gospels), Servire
- Powell, Mark Allan (2018), Introducing the New Testament: A Historical, Literary, and Theological Survey, Baker Books, ISBN 978-1441207043
- Pugh, Ben (2015), Atonement Theories: A Way through the Maze, James Clarke & Co
- Schäfer, Peter (2003). The History of the Jews in the Greco-Roman World. Routledge. ISBN 978-1134403165.
- Sheehan, Thomas (1986), The First Coming: How the Kingdom of God Became Christianity, Random House, ISBN 978-0394511986
- Siniscalchi, Glenn B. (2011). "'Resurrecting Jesus' and Critical Historiography: William Lane Craig and Dale Allison in Dialogue". Heythrop Journal. 52 (3): 362–73. doi:10.1111/j.1468-2265.2010.00610.x.
- Smith, Daniel A. (2007). The Post-Mortem Vindication of Jesus in the Sayings Gospel Q. Bloomsbury. ISBN 978-0567109873.
- Smith, Daniel A. (2010). Revisiting the Empty Tomb: The Early History of Easter. Fortress Press. ISBN 978-0800697013.
- Stroumsa, Gedaliahu A. G. (2004). "Christ's Laughter: Docetic Origins Reconsidered". Journal of Early Christian Studies. 12 (3). Johns Hopkins University Press: 267–88. doi:10.1353/earl.2004.0049. S2CID 170164256.
- Stubs, David L. (2008), "The shape of soteriology and the pistis Christou debate", Scottish Journal of Theology, 61 (2): 137–57, doi:10.1017/S003693060800392X, S2CID 170575588
- Talbert, Charles H. (2011), The Development of Christology during the First Hundred Years: and Other Essays on Early Christian Christology. Supplements to Novum Testamentum 140, Brill
- Taylor, Mark (2014), 1 Corinthians: An Exegetical and Theological Exposition of Holy Scripture, B&H Publishing, ISBN 978-0805401288
- Vermes, Geza (2008a), The Resurrection, London: Penguin, ISBN 978-0141912639
- Vermes, Geza (2008b), The Resurrection: History and Myth, New York: Doubleday, ISBN 978-0739499696
- Van Voorst, Robert E. (2000). "Eternal Life". In Freedman, David Noel; Myers, Allen C. (eds.). Eerdmans Dictionary of the Bible. Eerdmans. ISBN 978-9053565032.
- Ware, James (2014), "The Resurrection of Jesus in the Pre-Pauline Formula of 1 Cor 15.3–5", New Testament Studies, 60 (4): 475–98, doi:10.1017/S0028688514000150, ISSN 0028-6885
- Ware, James (2014b), "Paul's Understanding of the Resurrection in 1 Corinthians 15: 36–54", Journal of Biblical Literature, 133 (4): 809–35
- Weaver, J. Denny (2001), The Nonviolent Atonement, Wm. B. Eerdmans Publishing
- Wright, N.T. (2003), The Resurrection of the Son of God, Minneapolis: Fortress Press, ISBN 978-0800626792
- Wright, N. T. (2009). The Challenge of Easter.

Web sources
