= Dag Øistein Endsjø =

Norwegian professor (born 1968)

Dag Øistein Endsjø (born 11 November 1968) is a Norwegian professor in the study of religion and expert in human rights at the University of Oslo, Norway. He is the most translated Norwegian scholar in religion, published in thirteen languages.

== Career ==
The coat of arms of Fjord Municipality designed by Endsjø.

Endsjø's research focuses on the continuity between traditional Greek religion and early Christian beliefs, on sex and religion, immortality, religion and human rights, and religion and popular culture.

In his book Greek Resurrection Beliefs and the Success of Christianity (2009), he demonstrates how Christian resurrection beliefs also connect to ancient Greek beliefs in resurrection and physical immortality and may have contributed to the early success of Christianity in the Hellenistic Mediterranean. The book Primordial Landscapes, Incorruptible Bodies (2008) deals with the continuity of geography, asceticism, immortality between traditional Greek and early Christian worldviews. His book Flesh and Bones Forever: A History of Immortality examines the history of immortality beliefs in the Western tradition, and is published in English, Latvian, and Norwegian.

His book Sex and Religion: Teachings and Taboos in the History of World Faiths has been published in twelve languages: English, Arabic, Bulgarian, Chinese, Italian, Macedonian, Norwegian, Polish, Portuguese, Serbian, Swedish, and Ukrainian.

As an expert on human rights, Endsjø has published several texts particularly on the interconnection between religion and human rights.. He has also contributed to changing Norwegian equal rights legislation to be more in accordance with international human rights, as well as changing the national debate on equal rights into a general discussion of human rights. In a 2023 formal report to the United Nations Human Rights Council, the United Nations Independent Expert on sexual orientation and gender identity used Endsjø’s article “The Other Way around? How Freedom of Religion May Protect LGBT Rights” as the basis for pointing out that freedom of religion also protects pro-LGBT beliefs. He was the leader of the Norwegian Human Rights Alliance (Menneskerettsalliansen) in 2004–2013 and 2017-2019.

Endsjø has published various texts on religion and popular culture, and on ancient Greek religion. He writes frequently on a variety of political and popularized subjects in Norwegian media.

Endsjø is also the designer of the coat of arms of Fjord Municipality in Møre og Romsdal. He participated in the Norwegian selection for the 1994 Eurovision Song Contest as a lyricist and as part of the band SubDiva.

== Books ==
- Dyrenes evangelium (The Gospel of Animals). Efrem Forlag 2025. ISBN 978-82-84750-13-2.
- Flesh and Bones Forever: A History of Immortality. Hannacroix: Apocryphile Press 2023. ISBN 978-1-958061-36-7. Also published in Latvian and Norwegian.
- Religion og menneskerettigheter. Konflikt, balanse og idealer. (Religion and Human Rights. Conflict, Balance and Ideals). Oslo: Universitetsforlaget 2022. ISBN 978-8215059983.
- Sex and Religion: Teachings and Taboos in the History of World Faiths. London: Reaktion Books 2011 and New Dehli: Speaking Tiger 2023. ISBN 978-1-86189-815-9 and ISBN 9789354478222. Also published in Arabic, Bulgarian, Chinese, Italian, Macedonian, Norwegian, Polish, Portuguese, Serbian, Swedish, and Ukrainian.
- Det folk vil ha. Religion og populærkultur (What People Want. Religion and Popular Culture) (written together with Liv Ingeborg Lied). Oslo: Universitetsforlaget 2011. ISBN 978-82-15-01748-8
- Greek Resurrection Beliefs and the Success of Christianity. New York: Palgrave Macmillan 2009. ISBN 978-0230617292.
- Primordial Landscapes, Incorruptible Bodies. New York: Peter Lang 2008. ISBN 978-1433101816.
- Naturlig sex. Seksualitet og kjønn i den kristne antikken (co-editor with Halvor Moxnes and Jostein Børtnes). Oslo: Gyldendal Akademisk 2002.
- Lei av kjønn? Nær-kjønn-opplevelser og andre beretninger fra virkeligheten (co-editor with Helge Svare). Oslo: Cappelen Akademisk Forlag 2001.

== Other publications (selection) ==
- “The Nature Crisis and the Human Rights Protection of Right to Private Life after KlimaSeniorinnen v. Switzerland“. Nordic Environmental Law Journal 16:2, 2025: 7-28.
- “Immortality, Space, and the Subtle Heresy of Arthurian Expectations”. The Journal of Religious History, Literature and Culture 10, 2024: 1–36.
- “The Return of Alexander the Great in the Third Century A.D.: A Question of Daimones and Physical Immortality”. Classica et Mediaevalia 70, 2022: 149-79.
- “The Other Way around? How Freedom of Religion May Protect LGBT Rights”. The International Journal of Human Rights 24:10, 2020: 1681–1700.
- “Immortal Bodies, Before Christ. Bodily Continuity in Ancient Greece and 1 Corinthians”. Journal for the Study of the New Testament 30, 2008: 417–36.
- “Lesbian, Gay, Bisexual and Transgender Rights and the Religious Relativism of Human Rights”. Human Rights Review 6:2, 2005: 102–10.
- “To Control Death. Sacrifice and Space in Classical Greece”. Religion 33, 2003: 323–340.
- “To Lock up Eleusis. A Question of Liminal Space”. Numen 47, 2000: 351–86.
- “Placing the Unplaceable. The Making of Apollonius’s Argonautic Geography”. Greek, Roman and Byzantine Studies 38. 1997: 373–85.
