= Jostein Børtnes =

Norwegian philologist and professor

Jostein Børtnes (born 16 April 1937) is a Norwegian literary historian and Slavist with emphasis on Russian.

He was born in Hovin Municipality. He took the Russian training in the Norwegian Armed Forces, then graduated with the cand.philol. degree in Russian from the University of Oslo in 1965. He was a NAVF research fellow from 1966 to 1969, research fellow at the University of Oslo from 1970 to 1972, visiting fellow at Clare Hall from 1971 to 1972, and then lecturer at the University of Oslo. After taking the dr.philos. degree at the University of Oslo in 1976 he was promoted to first lecturer. He spent the years 1979 to 1982 at Sidney Sussex College.

Børtnes was promoted to docent in literary science at the University of Oslo in 1982 and professor of Russian literature at the University of Bergen in 1984. He remained here until retiring in 2007, and was also the dean of the Faculty of Humanities from 1991 to 1993. From 1993 to 1999 he was also an adjunct professor at the University of Tromsø.

Among his works are the books Det gammelrussiske helgenvita: dikterisk egenart og historisk betydning, PhD thesis from 1975 (translated into English as Visions of Glory: Studies in Early Russian Hagiography), Aristoteles om diktekunsten from 1980, and Episke problemer from 1980, in addition to contributions to journals and anthologies.

Børtnes became a member of the Norwegian Academy of Science and Letters in 1989 and the Royal Norwegian Society of Sciences and Letters in 1990. He resides at Paradis, Bergen.
