= Gospel of the Ebionites =

Apocryphal gospel

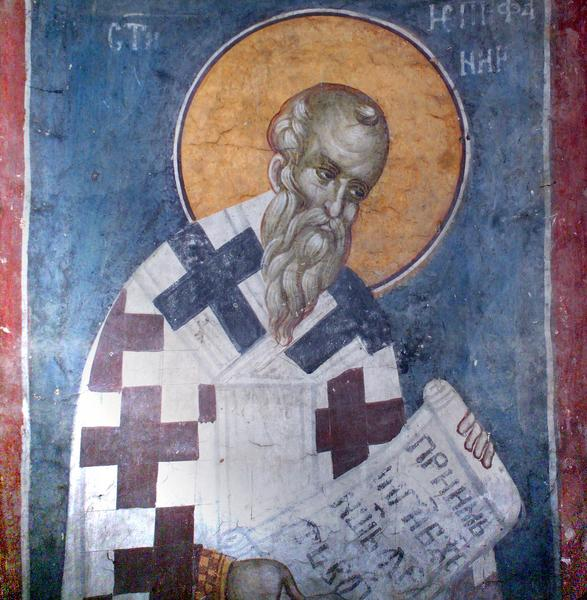
Epiphanius of Salamis' book the Panarion is the main source of information regarding the Gospel of the Ebionites.

The Gospel of the Ebionites is the conventional name given by scholars (Note: Cameron 1982, p. 103; The original title of the gospel is unknown.) to an apocryphal gospel extant only as seven brief quotations in a heresiology known as the Panarion, by Epiphanius of Salamis; (Note: Paget 2010, pp. 325–80; Paget provides a scholarly review of the recent academic literature on the Ebionites.) he misidentified it as the "Hebrew" gospel, believing it to be a truncated and modified version of the Gospel of Matthew. The quotations were embedded in a polemic to point out inconsistencies in the beliefs and practices of a Jewish Christian sect known as the Ebionites relative to Nicene orthodoxy. (Note: Finley 2009, pp. 291–3; p. 291 – "Unfortunately, Epiphanius' reliability as an historical witness is less than could be hoped. The statements he made about the Ebionites are relatively inconsistent, and cover a wide range of subjects. Epithanius did not make any statement about the Ebionites contrary to his strident sense of Nicene orthodoxy. Therefore, it seems possible that Epiphanius was merely using the Ebionites and literature that may or may not have been associated with the Ebionites to argue against all types of heretical views." p. 292 – "Epiphanius' main focus in the chapter on the Ebionites was Christological, and because of Epiphanius' efforts in support of the Nicene Christology, we should regard his statements about Ebionite Christology as particularly suspect." p. 293 – "It seems to me quite plain that Epiphanius was not attacking Jewish Christianity in Panarion 30, but instead Christological beliefs and Scriptural interpretations.")

The surviving fragments derive from a gospel harmony of the Synoptic Gospels, composed in Greek with various expansions and abridgments reflecting the theology of the writer. Distinctive features include the absence of the virgin birth and of the genealogy of Jesus; an Adoptionist Christology, (Note: Kloppenborg 1994, pp. 435–9; p. 435 – "This belief, known as "adoptionism", held that Jesus was not divine by nature or by birth, but that God chose him to become his son, i.e., adopted him.") in which Jesus is chosen to be God's Son at the time of his Baptism; the abolition of the Jewish sacrifices by Jesus; and an advocacy of vegetarianism. (Note: Vielhauer & Strecker 1991, pp. 166–71; p. 168 – "Jesus' task is to do away with the 'sacrifices'. In this saying (16.4–5), the hostility of the Ebionites against the Temple cult is documented.")

The omission of the genealogical records and the virgin birth of Jesus narrative is explained by Epiphanius as being because "they insist that Jesus was really man."

It is believed to have been composed some time during the middle of the 2nd century in or around the region east of the Jordan River. (Note: Vielhauer & Strecker 1991, pp. 166–71; p. 169 – "The place of origin is uncertain. It was possibly composed in the region east of Jordan,") Although the gospel was said to be used by "Ebionites" during the time of the early church, (Note: Skarsaune 2007, pp. 457–61; p. 461 – "To conclude, Epiphanius' portrayal of the Ebionites in Pan. 30 is a learned construction, based almost exclusively on written sources, ... At no point is there any certain evidence that Epiphanius' knowledge is based on firsthand, personal contact with Ebionites who called themselves by this name.") the identity of the group or groups that used it remains a matter of conjecture. (Note: Luomanen 2007, pp. 101–2, 115; pp. 101–2 – "Thus, we may have to reckon with the possibility that, from very early on, there may have been at least two types of Ebionites: (1) Hebrew/Aramaic-speaking Ebionites (Irenaeus Ebionites?) who shared James the Just's positive attitude toward the temple, used only Matthew's Gospel and accepted all the prophets; and (2) Hellenistic-Samaritan Ebionites (Epiphanius' Ebionites) who totally rejected worship in the temple, used only the Pentateuch, and, carrying with them the memory of Stephen's execution, perceived Paul as one of their major opponents.", p. 115 – "The Jewish Christianity of Irenaeus' Ebionites involved obedience to Jewish laws (including circumcision), anti-Paulinism, rejection of Jesus' virginal conception, reverence for Jerusalem (direction of prayer), use of Matthew's Gospel, Eucharist with water, and possibly the idea that Christ/Spirit entered Jesus at his baptism. ... However, the explicit rejection of the temple and its cult, the idea of the True Prophet and the (selective) acceptance of the Pentateuch only, show that Epiphanius' Ebionites were not direct successors of Irenaeus' Ebionites. Because it is not easy to picture a linear development from Irenaeus' Ebionites to Epiphanius' Ebionites, and because the Samaritans seem to link Epiphanius' Ebionites with the Hellenists of the early Jerusalem community, I am inclined to assume that Epiphanius' Ebionites were in fact successors of the Hellenistic "poor" of the early Jerusalem community, and that Irenaeus' Ebionites were successors of the Hebrews (see Acts 6–8) of the same community.")

The Gospel of the Ebionites is one of several Jewish–Christian gospels, along with the Gospel of the Hebrews and the Gospel of the Nazarenes; all survive only as fragments in quotations of the early Church Fathers. Due to their fragmentary state, the relationships, if any, between the Jewish–Christian gospels and a hypothetical original Hebrew Gospel are uncertain and have been a subject of intense scholarly investigation. (Note: Petersen 1992, p. 262 – "A dissenting position, however, is that of Boismard, who detects two traditions in Epiphanius' quotations from the gospel used by the Ebionites. One is a later, more developed tradition, which is probably a Greek language original; the second is a much more primitive tradition and has a strong imprint of a Semitic language. It is this latter tradition which Boismard equates with the Hebrew (i.e. pre-Greek) recension of Matthew – the document described by Epiphanius." For further details, see Boismard 1966, p. 351.) The Ebionite gospel has been recognized as distinct from the others, (Note: Klijn 1992, pp. 27–30; p. 27 – "we have to reckon with at least two different Gospels because we meet two different versions of the Baptism of Jesus, one referred to by Epiphanius, Panarion 30.13.7–8 and another one by Jerome, in Es. 11,1–3. At present it is generally assumed that Epiphanius quoted from a Gospel that was known to him only.") and it has been identified more closely with the lost Gospel of the Twelve. (Note: Puech & Blatz 1991, p. 374 – "the majority of critics today are inclined to identify it (the Gospel of the Twelve) with the Gospel of the Ebionites,") It shows no dependence on the Gospel of John and is similar in nature to the harmonized gospel sayings based on the Synoptic Gospels used by Justin Martyr, although a relationship between them, if any, is uncertain. There is a similarity between the gospel and a source document contained within the Clementine Recognitions (1.27–71), conventionally referred to by scholars as the Ascents of James, with respect to the command to abolish the Jewish sacrifices. (Note: Luomanen 2007, p. 95 – "there is such a fundamental agreement among the Pseudo-Clementine sources (especially Rec. 1.27–71), the "Gospel of the Ebionites", and Epiphanius' description of the Ebionites that there has to be a connection between them. The idea that Jesus came to abolish the sacrifices and that the temple was destroyed because the people were reluctant to cease sacrificing is unique within the early Christian tradition, making its appearance both in Rec. 1.27–71 and the "Gospel of the Ebionites" hardly coincidental." (Bauckham 2003, p. 168))

== Background ==
Epiphanius is believed to have come into possession of a gospel that he attributed to the Ebionites when he was bishop of Salamis, Cyprus. He alone among the Church Fathers identifies Cyprus as one of the "roots" of the Ebionites. The gospel survives only in seven brief quotations by Epiphanius in Chapter 30 of his heresiology the Panarion, or "Medicine Chest", (c. 377) (Note: Williams 1987, p. xvi – "It was begun in 374 or 375 (Panarion Proem II 2,3) and was written in great haste in less than three years.) as a polemic against the Ebionites. His citations are often contradictory and thought to be based in part on his own conjecture. (Note: Koch 1976, pp. 366–7; p. 366 – "It would seem that Epiphanius has composed Panarion 30 by combining various resources at hand. At several points he contradicts himself, which is largely occasioned by his method of composition – the juxtaposing of different sources." p. 367 – "One could choose to believe that Ebionitism in Epiphanius' day had become quite syncretistic. ... However, it should be underscored that this picture is presented only by Epiphanius, and once his literary method is recognized as a juxtaposition of sources, it is more difficult to accept this evolution of Ebionite thought as historical fact.") (Note: Williams 1987, p. xix – "In Epiphanius' view, then, the three bases of the Panarion are observation, documentation, and oral testimony. In some cases we should add a fourth to these: historical conjecture on Epiphanius' own part. ... In other words, Epiphanius may not without further investigation be assumed to be in possession of much historical information about the origins of the sects he discusses.") The various, sometimes conflicting, sources of information were combined to point out inconsistencies in Ebionite beliefs and practices relative to Nicene orthodoxy, (Note: Klijn 1992, p. 41 – "The Gospel according to the Ebionites was quoted by Epiphanius to show its absurdities. The selection of the references is, therefore, arbitrary and probably does not indicate the real contents of the Gospel.") possibly to serve, indirectly, as a polemic against the Arians of his time.

The term Gospel of the Ebionites is a modern convention; no surviving document of the early church mentions a gospel by that name. Epiphanius identifies the gospel only as "in the Gospel used by them, called 'according to Matthew'" and "they call it 'the Hebrew [gospel]'". (Note: Vielhauer & Strecker 1991, p. 140 – "That the two cannot be identical and are not so for Epiphanius, is shown by another note on the Gospel of the Ebionites: 'In the Gospel used by them',..") As early as 1689 the French priest Richard Simon called the text "Gospel of the Ebionites". The name is used by modern scholars as a convenient way to distinguish a gospel text that was probably used by the Ebionites from Epiphanius' mistaken belief that it was a Hebrew version of the Gospel of Matthew. (Note: Jones 2000, p. 364 – "Epiphanius connects his Ebionites with the Pseudo-Clementines, with the anti-Pauline Ascents of James, and with a gospel conveniently called the Gospel of the Ebionites by modern scholars.") Its place of origin is uncertain; one speculation is that it was composed in the region east of the Jordan where the Ebionites were said to have been present, according to the accounts of the Church Fathers. It is thought to have been composed during the middle of the 2nd century, since several other gospel harmonies are known to be from this period.

== Composition ==
According to scholars Oskar Skarsaune and Glenn Alan Koch, Epiphanius incorporated excerpts from the gospel text at a late stage in the composition of Panarion 30, primarily in chapters 13 and 14. (Note: Skarsaune 2007, pp. 457–61; p. 457 – "At a late stage in the writing of his Panarion, Epiphanius chanced upon a fourth source (a Greek gospel), which he immediately took to be Ebionite. He interpolated fragments from this Gospel in 30.13–4, at the end of another large interpolation, the Count Joseph story in 30.4–12.") (Note: Koch 1976, pp. 359–68; Koch provides a detailed analysis of Epiphanius' use of disparate sources and his editorial method of combining them to produce Panarion 30, including a gospel in his possession, which he attributed to the Ebionites. pp. 359–60 – "The GE materials are also clustered, which suggests that when Epiphanius decided to include these materials, he inserted them into the older materials in clusters. In other words, the addition of these materials to previous knowledge of the Ebionites is Epiphanius' own contribution to the subject." p. 365 – "An analysis of the distribution of the sources shows that the earlier patristic information is distributed throughout the chapters without obvious clustering. However, following the digression of chapters 4–12, clustering is quite evident in the other materials: the Ebionite Gospel materials are given for the most part in chapters 13 and 14.") As Epiphanius describes it, "The Gospel which is found among them ... is not complete, but falsified and distorted ..." (13.1–2). In particular, it lacked some or all of the first two chapters of Matthew, which contain the infancy narrative of the virgin birth of Jesus and the Davidic genealogy via Solomon, "They have removed the genealogies of Matthew ..." (14.2–3).

There is general agreement about the seven quotations by Epiphanius cited in the critical edition of "Jewish Christian gospels" by Philipp Vielhauer and Georg Strecker, translated by George Ogg, in Schneemelcher's New Testament Apocrypha. (Note: Elliott 2005, pp. 5–6, 14–6; Elliott's 1993 critical edition has a similar list of 7 quotations.) (Note: Vielhauer & Strecker 1991, pp. 166–71; Vielhauer & Strecker; Schneemelcher's New Testament Apocrypha 2nd edition (6th German edition) is considered the standard edition for new testament apocryphal writings. Three testimonies to that effect are as follows: 1. Christopher R. Matthews Philip, Apostle and Evangelist: configurations of a tradition 2002 " given the high visibility of Schneemelcher's assessment in the standard edition of the New Testament Apocrypha, ...", 2. Helmut Koester From Jesus to the Gospels: interpreting the New Testament 2007 p311 "The new standard edition of the New Testament Apocrypha in English translation is somewhat more cautious. Wilhelm Schneemelcher grants that some of the apocryphal writings "appear in ...", 3. Michael J. Wilkins, James Porter Moreland – Jesus under fire 1995 "The standard edition is the two-volume work of E. Hennecke and W. Schneemelcher, New Testament Apocrypha, trans. R. McL. Wilson (Philadelphia: Westminster, 1965)") The translations of Bernhard Pick (1908), with the sequence of four fragments arranged in the order of Vielhauer & Strecker from the beginning of the gospel are as follows:

It came to pass in the days of Herod, King of Judaea under the high priest Caiaphas, that John came and baptized with the baptism of repentance in the river Jordan; he is said to be from the tribe of Aaron and a son of Zacharias the priest and of Elizabeth and all went out to him. (13.6) And it came to pass when John baptized, that the Pharisees came to him and were baptized, and all Jerusalem also. He had a garment of camels' hair, and a leather girdle about his loins. And his meat was wild honey, which tasted like manna, formed like cakes of oil. (13.4) The people having been baptized, Jesus came also, and was baptized by John. And as he came out of the water the heavens opened, and he saw the Holy Spirit descending under the form of a dove, and entering into him. And a voice was heard from heaven: 'Thou art my beloved Son, and in thee am I well pleased'. And again: 'This day have I begotten thee'. And suddenly shone a great light in that place. And John seeing him, said, 'Who art thou, Lord'? Then a voice was heard from heaven: 'This is my beloved Son, in whom I am well pleased'. Thereat John fell at his feet and said: 'I pray thee, Lord, baptize me'. But he would not, saying 'Suffer it, for so it behoveth that all should be accomplished'. (13.7)

"There was a man named Jesus, and he was about thirty years old; he has chosen us. And He came into Capernaum and entered into the house of Simon, surnamed Peter, and He opened His mouth and said, 'As I walked by the Sea of Tiberias, I chose John and James, the sons of Zebedee, and Simon and Andrew and Thaddaeus and Simon Zelotes, and Judas Iscariot; thee also, Matthew, when thou wast sitting at the receipt of custom, did I call and thou didst follow me. According to my intention ye shall be twelve apostles for a testimony unto Israel'." (13.2b–3)

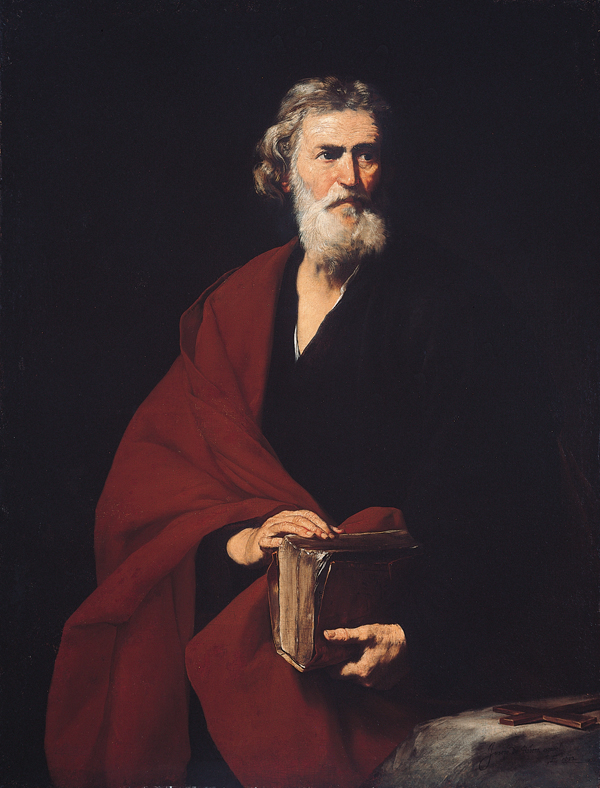
Matthew the Apostle is depicted as narrating directly to the reader in the Ebionite gospel, having been sent by Jesus "for a testimony to Israel".

The three quotations by Epiphanius in Panarion 30.13.6, 4, and 7, respectively, form the opening of the gospel narrative, including the mission of John the Baptist, his appearance and diet, and the baptism of Jesus by John. (Note: Kloppenborg 1994, pp. 435–9; p. 437 – Note: The composition of the opening narrative with the first 3 quotations follows Pick's order.) The beginning of the gospel (13.6) has parallels to the Gospel of Luke but in abbreviated form. The text shows a familiarity with the infancy narrative of Luke 1:5 despite lacking a birth narrative of its own. Quoting from the text regarding the diet of John (13.4), Epiphanius complains that the Ebionites have falsified the text by substituting the word "cake" (egkris ἐγκρίς) for "locust" (akris ἀκρίς, in Matthew 3:4). The similarity of the wording in Greek has led scholars to conclude that Greek was the original language of composition. (Note: Klijn 1992, pp. 67–8 – "The quotation shows the influence of the LXX. This and the word-play with regard to ἐγκρίς and ἀκρίς definitely shows that we are dealing with an original Greek work.") In the narrative of the baptism of Jesus by John (13.7), the voice of God speaks three times in close parallels to the Gospel of Mark 1:11, Luke 3:22 (Western text-type), and Matthew 3:17, respectively. The presence of multiple baptismal theophanies has led to a consensus among modern scholars that the text quoted by Epiphanius is a gospel harmony (Note: A gospel harmony is a blending of two or more gospels into a single narrative; the earliest known examples, dating to the 2nd or 3rd century, are Tatian's Diatessaron, Dura Parchment 24, and, possibly, an unnamed gospel conventionally known as the Egerton Gospel.) of the Synoptic Gospels. (Note: Ehrman 2005, p. 102 – "this particular Gospel of the Ebionites appears to have been a "harmonization" of the New Testament Gospels of Matthew, Mark and Luke. Evidence that it harmonized the earlier sources comes in the account that it gave of Jesus' baptism. As careful readers have long noticed, the three Synoptic Gospels all record the words spoken by a voice from heaven as Jesus emerges from the water; but the voice says something different in all three accounts: "This is my Son in whom I am well pleased" (Matt. 3:17); "You are my Son, in whom I am well pleased" (Mark 1:11); and, in the oldest witness to Luke's Gospel, "You are my Son, today I have begotten you" (Luke 3:23). ... In the Gospel of the Ebionites ... the voice speaks three times, saying something different on each occasion.") The appearance of a great light on the water may be an echo of St. Paul's conversion or an additional harmonization of the Gospel of the Hebrews to this work. (Note: Edwards 2009, pp. 71–4; p. 71, referencing E.B. Nicholson (1879), The Gospel according to the Hebrews, pp. 40–2, on the great light on the water during the baptism of Jesus.)

Epiphanius begins his description of the gospel text (13.2b–3) with a quotation which has the apostle Matthew narrating directly to the reader. Jesus recalls how the twelve apostles were chosen and addresses Matthew in the second person as "you also Matthew". Although twelve apostles are mentioned, only eight are named. (Note: Kloppenborg 1994, pp. 435–9; p. 438, fn. 2:5 – "Ebionites specifies twelve apostles, while Epiphanius names only eight.") They are said to be chosen by Jesus, "for a testimony to Israel". The phrase "he has chosen us" has been interpreted as evidence that the text may be the lost Gospel of the Twelve mentioned by Origen. However, the identification of the gospel text quoted by Epiphanius with this otherwise unknown gospel is disputed. (Note: Klijn 1992, pp. 6, 28; p. 6 – "The Gospel of the Twelve is sometimes identified with the Gospel of the Ebionites mentioned by Epiphanius. If this were true, the Gospel could be called Jewish–Christian, but this identification is a matter of dispute." p. 28 – Klijn follows Waitz and Zahn in tentatively assigning this text as the Gospel of The Twelve, "At the beginning of this quotation there is a mention of us, viz. the twelve apostles, who also seem to be responsible for the contents of this Gospel. This would mean that the Gospel could be called 'Gospel of the Twelve', which is the name of a Gospel mentioned in a passage in Origen. (Origen, Comm. Matt. 1:1–10)") The position of this quotation was tentatively assigned based on a parallel to the Synoptic Gospels. (Note: Vielhauer & Strecker 1991, pp. 166–71; p. 166 – "Despite the arguments advanced by Waitz, it remains questionable whether the fragment cited by Epiphanius is to be reckoned with the GE.")

The fifth and sixth quotations (following Vielhauer & Strecker's order) are associated with a Christological controversy. The polemics of Epiphanius along with his quotations of the gospel text (in italics) are shown in parallel:

"Moreover they deny that he was a man, evidently on the ground of the word which the Savior spoke when it was reported to him: 'Behold, thy mother and thy brethren stand without' , namely: 'Who is my mother and who are my brethren'? And he stretched forth his hand towards his disciples and said: 'These are my brethren and mother and sisters, which do the will of my Father'." (14.5)

"They say that he was not begotten of God the Father, but created as one of the archangels ... that he rules over the angels and all the creatures of the Almighty, and that he came and declared, as their Gospel, which is called according to the Hebrews, reports: 'I am come to abolish the sacrifices, if ye cease not from sacrificing, the wrath will not cease from you'." (16.4–5)

The fifth quotation (14.5) appears to be a harmony of Matthew 12:47–48 and its Synoptic parallels. However, Jesus' final proclamation shows a closer agreement to 2 Clement 9:11 than any of the Synoptics. (Note: Koester 1990, p. 351 – "The same harmonization of Matthean and Lukan redactional changes of Mark's text of this saying appears in its quotation in Clement of Alexandria (Eclogae propheticae 20.3) and the Gospel of the Ebionites. 2 Clem. 9.11 thus presupposes a more widely known document or a tradition in which this saying already appeared in a harmonized version.") The unity of this quotation with the gospel text in Chapter 13 has been questioned. (Note: Skarsaune 2007, pp. 457–61; p. 458, referencing Alfred Schmidtke (1911), Neue Fragmente, p. 223: Schmidtke speculated that the fragment may derive from Origen's commentary on John, (Comm. Jo. 2.12), which quotes from the Gospel of the Hebrews.) The command to abolish the sacrifices in the sixth quotation (16.5) is unparalleled in the Canonical Gospels, and it suggests a relationship to Matthew 5:17 ("I did not come to abolish the Law") that is echoed in the Clementine literature. (Note: Kloppenborg 1994, pp. 435–9; p. 439 – "In saying, 'I did not come to do away with the law', and yet doing away with something, he indicated that what he did away with had not originally been part of the law." (Ps-Cl Homilies 3.51.2))

Referring to a parallel passage in Luke 22:15, Epiphanius complains that the Ebionites have again falsified the gospel text:

"They destroyed the true order and changed the passage ... they made the disciples say, 'Where wilt Thou that we prepare for Thee to eat the Passover'? To which He replied: 'I have no desire to eat the flesh of this Paschal Lamb with you'." (22.4)

thereby making Jesus declare that he would not eat meat during the Passover. The immediate context suggests the possible attribution of the quotation to a Clementine source; (Note: Skarsaune 2007, pp. 457–61; p. 459 – "It is far from certain, however, that this saying derives from the Ebionite Gospel.", p. 460 – "The probability that Epiphanius took this from the same source he is exploiting in the context – the Pseudo-Clementine Journeys – seems to me so great that attributing the saying to the Ebionite Gospel is the less likely hypothesis.") however a linkage between the gospel fragments and the Clementine literature remains uncertain.

== Christology ==
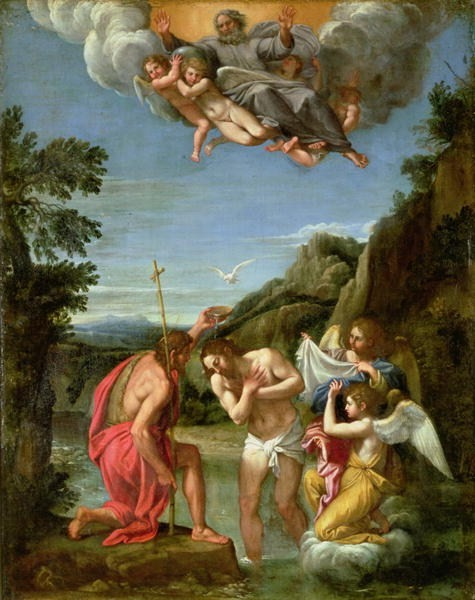
Jesus became one with God by Adoption at his Baptism according to the Gospel of the Ebionites, fulfilling a proclamation of Psalm 2:7 "You are my son, this day I have begotten you."

The baptismal scene of the gospel text (13.7) is a harmony of the Synoptic Gospels, but one in which the Holy Spirit is said to descend to Jesus in the form of a dove and enter into him. This divine election at the time of his baptism is known as an Adoptionist Christology, (Note: Paget 2010, pp. 349–57; Paget provides an overview of the recent scholarly literature on the Adoptionism of the Ebionites.) and it is emphasized by the quotation of Psalm 2:7, as found in the "Western text" of Luke 3:22, "You are my son, this day I have begotten you." (Note: Evans 2007, pp. 251–3; p. 251 – "This Gospel's statement that the Spirit "entered into" Jesus is an important addition to the story. This Gospel also adds a quotation of part of Psalm 2:7 ("Today I have begotten you").") (Note: Ehrman 1993, pp. 49–51, 62–7; p. 49 – "With respect to other New Testament traditions concerning Jesus' baptism, the earliest textual witnesses of the Gospel according to Luke preserve a conspicuously adoptionistic formula in the voice from heaven, 'You are my son, today I have begotten you' (Luke 3:22)." p. 62 – "This is the reading of codex Bezae and a number of ecclesiastical writers from the second century onward.") The Spirit entering into Jesus and the great light on the water are thought to be based on the prophecies of Isaiah 61:1 and 9:1, respectively. (Note: Skarsaune 2007, pp. 457–61; p. 461 – "The Spirit "going into" Jesus recalls prophetical endowment with the Spirit, cf. Isa 61:1: 'The Spirit of the Lord is with me, for he has anointed me to preach good news to the poor..'. The great light shining recalls Isa 9:1: 'The people wandering in darkness shall see a great light; those who dwell in the land and shadow of death, over you the light shall shine.'") His Adoptionist son-ship is characterized by the belief that Jesus was a mere man, who, by virtue of his perfect righteousness, was imbued with the divinity of the eternal Christ through his Baptism in order to carry out the prophetic task for which he had been chosen. (Note: Lapham 2003, pp. 84–7; p. 86 – "Christ was no more than a man (albeit the most righteous and wisest of all) upon whom, after his baptism by John, the eternal Christ of the heavens descended and rested upon him until the time of his Passion. This idea is clearly represented in another of Epiphanius' quotations from the Ebionite Gospel." (Panarion 30.13.7)) (Note: Häkkinen 2008, pp. 267–8; Häkkinen provides a detailed description of the Christology of the Ebionite gospel. A translation of Epiphanius' commentary relevant to Jesus' Adoption reads as follows: p. 267 - (1) "This is because they mean that Jesus is really a man, as I said, but that Christ, who descended in the form of a dove, has entered him – as we have found already in other sects – <and> been united with him. Christ himself <is from God on high, but Jesus> is the product of a man's seed and a woman." (Pan. 30.14.4); (2) "And they say that this is why Jesus was begotten of the seed of a man and chosen, and thus named the Son of God by election, after the Christ, who had come to him from on high in the form of a dove." (Pan. 30.16.3); (3) "They say, however, that Christ is prophet of truth and Christ; <but> that he is Son of God by promotion, and by his connection with the elevation given to him from above. ... He alone, they would have it, is prophet, man, Son of God, and Christ – and yet a mere man, as I said, though owing to virtue of life he has come to be called the Son of God." (Pan. 30.18.5–6); For additional details, see Verheyden 2003, pp. 193–4.)

The absence of any reference to a Davidic son-ship in the gospel text suggests that Jesus has been elected to be the end-time prophet, the Chosen One, sent to abolish the Jewish sacrifices. (Note: Klijn 1992, p. 41 – "During his baptism, Jesus is chosen as God's son. At that moment, God generated him. ... He is the Chosen One, and at the moment that this becomes evident a light radiates.") The Prophet-Christology of the gospel text quoted by Epiphanius is more at home with the Clementine literature than the Christology of the Ebionites known to Irenaeus. (Note: Skarsaune 2007, pp. 457–61; p. 461 – "it does not seem far-fetched to conclude that the Ebionite Gospel understood Jesus' baptism as his being called and endowed to be the end-time prophet (rather than the Davidic Messiah). ... It is clear, however, that he (Epiphanius) was quite mistaken in identifying the group authoring or using this Gospel with the Irenaen Ebionites. The Prophet-Christology of the Gospel would rather point to the group behind the Pseudo-Clementines Grundschrift as near theological relatives.") (Note: Luomanen 2007, p. 92 – "The idea that Jesus, the True Prophet, came to abolish the sacrifices is central to the Pseudo-Clementines. In this regard, it is clear that the 'Gospel of the Ebionites' agreed with them.") According to scholars Richard Bauckham and Petri Luomanen, Jesus is understood in this gospel as having come to abolish the sacrifices rather than substituting for them; thus it is unlikely that it contained the same institution of the Eucharist as practiced by Nicene orthodox Christianity. (Note: Luomanen 2012, pp. 153–4; p. 153 – "The Ebionites did not believe that the sacrifices could be abolished by replacing them with Jesus' own once-and-for-all sacrifice. In this regard, the Ebionites theology clearly differed from the theology expressed in the Letter to the Hebrews." p. 154 – "To summarize the conclusions of the reconstruction: Epiphanius' quotation from the Gospel of the Ebionites indicates that there was a description of preparations for the Last Supper where Jesus says he does not want to eat meat. Because another quotation from the Gospel of the Ebionites reveals that the Ebionites opposed sacrifices, it is unlikely that they would have granted a sacrificial value to Jesus' blood. Thus, it is also unlikely that the Gospel of the Ebionites would have included the institution of the Eucharistic cup of blood. Epiphanius' remark a bit earlier in the Panarion about the Ebionites practice of celebrating Passover year after year with unleavened bread and water confirms that the assumption that there could not have been any institution of the Eucharistic cup of blood in the Gospel of the Ebionites.) However, scholars have yet to reach a consensus over the sacrificial significance of Jesus' mission as depicted in the Ebionite gospel. (Note: Ehrman & Pleše 2011, p. 211 – "In particular, it is clear that they maintained that Jesus was the perfect sacrifice for sins, so that there was no longer any need for the Jewish sacrificial cult.")

== Vegetarianism ==
The change in wording of the gospel text from "locust" (akris) to "cake" (egkris) for John the Baptist's diet (13.4) has been interpreted as evidence of Jewish vegetarianism. (Note: Klijn 1992, pp. 67–8; p. 68 – "John the Baptist is supposed to have followed a vegetarian life-style." with a reference to S. Brock, (1970) The Baptists Diet in Syriac Sources, Oriens Christianus, vol.54, pp. 113–24) (Note: Lapham 2003, pp. 84–7; p. 85 – "The deviation in the description of John's food is doubtless an indication of the vegetarian customs of the Ebionites.") However, the association of the diet of John the Baptist with vegetarianism has been questioned. Epiphanius gives no indication of concern for vegetarianism in this part of the Gospel text, and it may instead be an allusion to the manna in the wilderness of Exodus 16:31 and Numbers 11:8, (Note: Evans 2007, pp. 251–3; p. 251 – "Linking John's wilderness food with the food the Israelites ate while crossing the wilderness and preparing for entry into the promised land may lend an additional element of restoration theology to the ministry and activity of John.") or, according to scholar Glenn Alan Koch, to 1 Kings 19:6 where Elijah eats cakes. (Note: Koch 1976, pp. 328–9; p. 328 – "While it is not clear which version is older, one might perhaps see at work here an exegetical principle which was practiced in Judaism ... – the change in meaning occasioned by the change of a syllable." p. 329 – "On the other hand, one might argue just as convincingly that the Exodus-manna typology is older than the "locust" texts, ... This would have the effect of identifying John the Baptist with the desert experience, perhaps conveying the impression that he was the new prophet like Moses.")

Further evidence has been found in the quotation based on Luke 22:15 (22.4), where the saying has been modified by insertion of the word "flesh" to provide a rationale for vegetarianism. (Note: Evans 2007, pp. 251–3; p. 253 – The saying may indicate that Christ is the Passover sacrifice, so that eating the Passover lamb is no longer required and a vegetarian diet may be observed.) The immediate context of the quotation suggests that it may be closely related to a Clementine source, the Journeys of Peter. Reading from the same source, Epiphanius states that the Ebionites abstained from "meat with soul in it" (15.3), and he attributes this teaching to Ebionite interpolations: "they corrupt the contents and leave a few genuine items". Due to the close association of this saying with the Clementine literature of the 3rd and 4th century, the earlier practice of vegetarianism by the 2nd-century Ebionites known to Irenaeus has been questioned. (Note: Skarsaune 2007, pp. 454–5; p. 454 – "The 'Ebionite' reason for not eating meat seems to be based on a fear of eating souls, which was the main reason for Pythagorean vegetarianism." p. 455 – "In summary, Epiphanius' report of the vegetarianism of the 'Ebionites' seems to be based on his reading of the Pseudo-Clementine Journeys of Peter (and possibly other pseudo-apostolic works) ... which makes one hesitate very much in ascribing any of this to the Ebionites of Irenaeus and his followers.") The strict vegetarianism of the Ebionites known to Epiphanius may have been a reaction to the cessation of Jewish sacrifices and a safeguard against the consumption of unclean meat in a pagan environment. (Note: Gregory 2008, pp. 61–66; p. 65 – "There may also be evidence for vegetarianism elsewhere in Epiphanius' citations from the Gospel of the Ebionites, for it has Jesus deny that he wished to eat meat with his disciples at Passover (Pan. 30.22.4). Yet care must be taken in assessing this evidence. The link between those whose practices are reflected in the Pseudo-Clementines and in the Gospel of the Ebionites is by no means certain, and Jesus' statement about the Passover may reflect an aversion primarily to sacrifices and to meat associated with sacrifices rather than to meat as such.")

== Relationship to other texts ==
Epiphanius incorrectly refers to the gospel in his possession as the Gospel of Matthew and the gospel "according to the Hebrews", perhaps relying upon and conflating the writings of the earlier Church Fathers, Irenaeus and Eusebius, respectively. (Note: Paget 2010, pp. 331–2, 341; pp. 321–2 - "Epiphanius seems simply to have combined the claim of Irenaeus and many others that the Ebionites used Matthew only, the claim of Papias that Matthew was written in Hebrew (Eusebius, Hist. eccl. 3.39.16), and the claim of Eusebius that they called their Gospel 'according to the Hebrews'." p. 341 - "most scholars would accept that Epiphanius' introduction to the Gospel is an odd amalgam of different statements about the Ebionite gospel.") (Note: Skarsaune 2007, pp. 435, 446, 457–8; p. 435, Irenaeus – "For the Ebionites who use the Gospel according to Matthew only, are confuted of this very same book, when they make false suppositions with regard to the Lord." (Haer. 3.11.7); p. 446, Eusebius – "These men moreover thought that it was necessary to reject all the epistles of the Apostle, whom they called an apostate from the Law; and they used only the so-called Gospel according to the Hebrews and made small account of the rest." (Hist. eccl. 3.27.1); p. 457, Epiphanius – "They also accept the Gospel according to Matthew. For they too use only this like the followers of Cerinthus and Merinthus. They call it, however, 'according to the Hebrews', which name is correct since Matthew is the only one in the New Testament who issued the Gospel and the proclamation in Hebrew and with Hebrew letters." (Panarion 30.3.7); p. 458 – "It seems rather clear that Epiphanius' characterization of the Gospel used by the Ebionites in (30.)3.7 is not based on firsthand knowledge of the Gospel quoted in (30.)13–14, nor are the contents of the introductory remarks in (30.)13.2 taken from the Gospel itself. They are rather an attempt to adjust the traditional description in (30.)3.7 to the new document Epiphanius has got hold of and which he took to be the Gospel his predecessors among the Fathers had been talking about.") His 4th century colleague Jerome remarks that the Nazarenes and Ebionites both used the Gospel of the Hebrews, which was considered the original Matthew by many of them. Jerome's report is consistent with the prior accounts of Irenaeus and Eusebius. (Note: Skarsaune 2007, pp. 544–5 Jerome – "In the Gospel which the Nazoraeans and the Ebionites use which we translated recently from Hebrew to Greek and which is called the authentic text of Matthew by a good many, it is written ..." Comm. Matt. 12.13)

The relationship between the Gospel of the Ebionites, the Gospel of the Hebrews, and the Gospel of the Nazarenes remains unclear. All the Jewish–Christian gospels survive only as fragments in quotations, so it is difficult to tell if they are independent texts or variations of each other. Scholar Albertus Klijn established the modern consensus, concluding that the gospel harmony composed in Greek appears to be a distinctive text known only to Epiphanius. Scholar Marie-Émile Boismard has claimed the Ebionite gospel is partly dependent upon a hypothetical Hebrew gospel as a source; however this conjecture remains a minority view. (Note: Boismard 1966, p. 351 – "Si ce renseignement d'Épiphane est exact, Ébion. 2 pourrait representer une forme plus ou moins remaniée, de l'évangile primitif de Matthieu, lequel correspondrait donc au texte que nous avons appele Y (Éb. 2).") Its putative relationship to the gospel text known to Origen as the Gospel of the Twelve remains a subject of scholarly debate. Michael Kok has defended the common scholarly view against the recent revival by David B. Sloan and James R. Edwards of the hypothesis that a single Gospel according to the Hebrews underlies the patristic testimonies, arguing from the gospel's baptism narrative that it replicates Matthean and Lucan redactional elements and so is unlikely to be the source of the Synoptic double tradition or of Luke's special material.

The Ebionite gospel is one example of a type of gospel harmony that used the Gospel of Matthew as a base text but did not include the Gospel of John; it is believed to pre-date Tatian's Diatessaron (c. 170) which included all four canonical gospels. The gospel has a parallel to a quotation in a mid-2nd-century homily known as 2 Clement, suggesting that both may be dependent on a harmonizing tradition from an earlier 2nd century source. (Note: Luomanen 2012, pp. 206–12, 223–5; Luomanen provides a detailed text-critical analysis of the synoptic and non-canonical parallels to the Gospel of the Ebionites fragment Pan. 30.14.5, including Gospel of Thomas logion 99. He concludes that the Gospel of the Ebionites, Gospel of Thomas, and 2 Clement are dependent upon a pre-Diatessaronic harmonizing gospel tradition.) (Note: Tuckett 2012, pp. 201–2; p. 202 – "we may also note the presence of a similar harmonized version of the saying (2 Clem. 9.11) in Gos. Eb. (Pan. 30.14.5) and in Clement of Alexandria (Ecl. 20.3). Hence it may well be that 2 Clement here is dependent on a separate source that had already harmonized the different versions of the saying in the synoptics into its present form here.) The harmonized gospel sayings sources used by Justin Martyr to compose his First Apology and Dialogue with Trypho were similarly based on the Synoptic Gospels. (Note: Bellinzoni 1967, pp. 140–1; Bellinzoni states that Justin was primarily dependent upon an early Christian catechism and a reference manual (vade mecum) of sayings against heresies for his sources of harmonized gospel sayings. According to Bellinzoni, p. 141 – "It must, however, be emphasized that there is absolutely no evidence that Justin ever composed a complete harmony of the Synoptic Gospels; his harmonies were of limited scope and were apparently composed for didactic purposes.") According to scholar George Howard, harmonization was a widely used method of composition in the early Patristic period. Many of the heterodox variants found in the Gospel of the Ebionites may have been adopted from a larger pool of variants that were in circulation; an example is the appearance of a great light that shone during Jesus' Baptism which is also found in the Diatessaron.

The Recognitions of Clement contains a source document (Rec. 1.27–71), conventionally referred to by scholars as the Ascents of James, (Note: Luomanen 2007, p. 93 – "Scholars also largely agree that one section of the Recognitions, Rec. 1.27–71, is based on an independent source, but there is no consensus about the possible original title of the writing. Some think that this section of the Recognitions (Rec. 1.27–71) may indeed preserve the Ascents of James, which Epiphanius ascribes to the Ebionites in Pan. 30.16.7 (Van Voorst 1989).") which is believed to be of Jewish–Christian origin. (Note: Van Voorst 1989, pp. 177, 180; p. 177 – "There is, in fact, no section of the Clementine literature about whose origin in Jewish Christianity one may be more certain." (quoting the conclusion of Martyn 1978, p. 271)) The Ascents shares a similarity to the Gospel of the Ebionites with regard to the baptism of the Pharisees by John (Pan. 30.13.4; Rec. 1.54.6–7) and the command to abolish the Jewish sacrifices, adding that a Christian water baptism is to be substituted for the remission of sins. (Note: Skarsaune 2007, p. 395 – "The most striking parallel to this concept (Christian baptism as a substitute for sacrifices for purification from sin) is to be found in the Jewish–Christian source in the Pseudo-Clementine Recognitions, 1.27–71. Here we read the following: '[The prophet like Moses] would first of all admonish them ... to cease with sacrifices; lest they think that with the ceasing of the sacrifices remission of sins could not be effected for them, [he] instituted for them baptism by water, in which they might be absolved of all sins through the invocation of his name, ... [so that] henceforth following a perfect life they might remain in immortality, purified not through the blood of animals but through the purification of God's wisdom'." (Rec. 1.39.1–2)) Based on these similarities, scholars Richard Bauckham and F. Stanley Jones have postulated a direct dependence of the Ascents of James on the Gospel of the Ebionites.

== Inferences about the Ebionites ==
The gospel Epiphanius attributed to the Ebionites is a valuable source of information that provides modern scholars with insights into the distinctive characteristics of a vanished branch of Jewish Christianity. (Note: Bauckham 2003, pp. 162–4, 172; p.163 – "Epiphanius' much fuller and not entirely consistent account of the Ebionites draws on significant literary sources unknown to the earlier Fathers as well as his own deductions and guesses. His most valuable contribution is the quotations he provides from a gospel he attributes to them, and which is therefore called by modern scholars the Gospel of the Ebionites." p. 172 – "If the Gospel of the Ebionites and the Ascents of James were Ebionite texts, the implications, not only for their beliefs, but also for their origins, are considerable.") However, scholars disagree on whether the information contained within the seven fragments preserved by Epiphanius accurately reflects the traditions of the second-century Ebionite sect known to Irenaeus, or if their belief system changed, perhaps greatly, over a span of 200 years compared to this early group. (Note: Luomanen 2007, p. 88 – "Much of what Epiphanius reports about the Ebionites is consistent with the accounts of his predecessors, Irenaeus, Hippolytus, Origen, and Eusebius." p. 314, notes: See Irenaeus, Haer. 1.26.2; 3.11.7; Hippolytus, Haer. 7.34.1–2; 10.22; Origen, Cels. 5.65; Hom. Gen. 3.5; Hom. Jer. 19.12.2; Eusebius, Hist. eccl. 3.27.1–6; 6.17.) The Ebionites (Note: Ehrman 2005, pp. 95–103; Ehrman offers a popular treatment of the subject, see pp. 95–103.) (Note: Klijn & Reinink 1973, pp. 19–43; Klijn & Reinink offers a rigorous academic treatment of the subject, see pp. 19–43.) known to Irenaeus (first mentioned in Adversus Haereses 1.26.2, written around 185) and other Church Fathers prior to Epiphanius were described as a Jewish sect that regarded Jesus as the Messiah but not as divine. They insisted on the necessity of following Jewish law and rites and they used only the Jewish–Christian gospel. The Ebionites rejected the epistles of Paul of Tarsus, whom they regarded as an apostate from the Law.

In Epiphanius' polemic against the Ebionites found in Panarion 30, a complex picture emerges of the beliefs and practices of the 4th century Ebionites that cannot easily be separated from his method of combining disparate sources. While scholars such as Hans-Joachim Schoeps literally interpreted Epiphanius' account as describing a later syncretic development of Ebionism, (Note: Schoeps 1969, pp. 9–17; p. 12 – "That the "patriarch of orthodoxy," as Epiphanius was called, had in any event a positive knowledge of the Ebionites, and that the original Clementines, in some form or another, were connected with them, I believe I have irrefutably demonstrated.") (Note: Bauckham 2003, pp. 163–4; In a recent affirmation of this view, Bauckham argues that the Gospel of the Ebionites was written by the same group of Ebionites known to Irenaeus. He further states that Irenaeus' report that the 2nd-century Ebionites used the Gospel of Matthew was a reference to their name for the Ebionite gospel.) more recent scholarship has found it difficult to reconcile his report with those of the earlier Church Fathers, leading to a conjecture by scholar Petri Luomanen that a second group of Hellenistic-Samaritan Ebionites may also have been present. (Note: Luomanen 2012, pp. 17–49, 161–5, 233–5, 241; See Luomanen 2012 for further details on the origins and characteristics of the Ebionites known to Epiphanius; p. 241 – Summary and Conclusion: "Epiphanius' Ebionites/Hellenistic–Samaritan Ebionites probably were an offspring of the missionary activity of the Hellenists of the early Jerusalem community among the Samaritans. Later on, they also adopted some Elchasaite ideas. Epiphanius found the Gospel of the Ebionites among them.") (Note: Van Voorst 1989, pp. 177, 180; Similarly, Van Voorst concludes that the Jewish–Christian tradition on which Rec. 1.33–71 is based may be traced back, albeit indirectly, to the Hellenists of the Jerusalem Church; p. 180 – "While there is not enough evidence to conclude that the community of the AJ (Ascents of James) is the lineal physical descendent of the Hellenist Jewish Christians of Acts, it certainly is a spiritual descendant of Stephen and his circle.") The rejection of the Jewish sacrifices and the implication of an end-time prophet Christology due to the lack of a birth narrative lend support for the association of the Gospel of the Ebionites with a group or groups different from the Ebionites known to Irenaeus. (Note: Skarsaune 2007, pp. 457–61; pp. 460–1 – "There is one more feature of this Gospel that clearly makes it distinct ... it contained no genealogy of Jesus. According to Epiphanius, it began with a short version of Luke 3:1–3. ... This probably reveals something about the genre this Gospel was intended to represent. This is clearly the beginning of a prophet's book. We have seen repeatedly how important the Davidic genealogy was for Ebionite Christology; it was the importance of this Davidic lineage through Joseph that made them deny the virgin birth. For them, Jesus was the Davidic Messiah. For the author of the Ebionite Gospel this seems to have been no concern at all. Instead, he may have conceived of Jesus as the end-time prophet, endowed with the Spirit at his calling – his baptism by John.")

Scholarship in the area of Jewish Christian studies has tended to be based on artificial constructs similar to those developed by the early Christian heresiologists, with the underlying assumption that all of the beliefs and practices of these groups were based on theology. (Note: Skarsaune 2007, pp. 745–7; p. 746 – "Especially in studies of 'Jewish Christianity', a history of ideas approach has often been dominant, constructing an ideological entity that was studied as such. Quite apart from the fact that this entity had all the marks of being a modern scholarly construct based on similar constructs by the early Christian heresiologists, this Jewish Christianity was often constructed as a uniform entity. ... And it was assumed that their practice was determined by their theology. If, therefore, differences of practice were observed among members of Jewish Christianity, this was explained by differences in theology.) This has led to the perpetuation of ideological definitions that fail to take into account the pluriformity of these groups, reflecting differences in geography, (Note: Skarsaune 2007, pp. 745–7, 755–67; The synchronic perspective distinguishes differences in practice based on geographic location and social setting.) (Note: Lapham 2003, pp. 84–7; Fred Lapham takes a geographical approach to describing different forms of early Jewish Christianity; he classifies the Gospel of the Ebionites as a document of the "Church in Samaria".) time periods in history, (Note: Skarsaune 2007, pp. 745–7, 767–77; The diachronic perspective distinguishes differences in practice based on time periods in history, e.g. the "Constantinian Revolution".) and ethnicity. (Note: Skarsaune 2007, pp. 748–9; p. 748 – "In the ancient Christian sources a clear distinction is made between Jewish believers in Jesus and Gentile believers in Jesus. The two groups were not distinguished from each other by anything that was believed or done by all within each group. ... This was defined by their ethnic background and by this only. The border line between Jewish and Gentile believers in Jesus was exactly as sharp and as blurred as the border line between Jews and Gentiles in general.") With respect to Epiphanius, and the Ebionites in particular, insufficient attention has been paid to the highly speculative nature of his theological constructs (Note: Skarsaune 2007, p. 754 – "It is understandable that many modern histories of Jewish Christianity have taken Epiphanius and his predecessors as their starting point and have taken over his classification of the Jewish Christian sects. ... This approach was, in my view, based on an insufficient awareness of the highly speculative nature of Epiphanius' constructions. If any description of heresies should be characterized as little more than artificial constructs, Epiphanius' reports on the Jewish Christian sects are worthy candidates.") and his mixing together of disparate sources, (Note: Paget 2010, pp. 332–3 – "Epiphanius' account of the Ebionites is obviously polemical in intent and that polemic manifests itself not least in a desire to make the Ebionites look hybrid ... Such a presentation obviously leads to a view of the sect as inconsistent, and 'the receptical of all sorts of heretical ideas'. ... These so-called 'conflicting accounts', as Epiphanius calls them, come from a medley of sources.") including his use of a gospel harmony that may have had nothing to do with the Ebionite sect known to Irenaeus. (Note: Skarsaune 2007, p. 754 – "His (Epiphanius') portrait of the Ebionites is not based on firsthand knowledge of this group. It is a very mixed composite of every scrap of literary information Epiphanius thought he could ascribe to them. ... As a consequence he attributed to them both Elkesaite ideas and a harmonistic gospel that apparently had nothing to do with the Ebionites.") In the end, he presents an enigmatic picture of the Ebionites and their place in early Christian history. (Note: Paget 2010, pp. 341, 376; p. 341 – "in the end we are wholly dependent upon Epiphanius for the view that the GE is Ebionite and that such dependence raises considerable problems, not least because the contents of the Epiphanian GE do not obviously square with what we hear about either the Gospel or the Ebionites in earlier sources. p. 376 - "In the end the Ebionites, in spite of, perhaps even because of, the plentiful information we potentially have about them, remain somewhat of a mysterious witness to an important aspect of early Christian history.")

== See also ==
- List of Gospels
- Gospel of Cerinthus

== Sources ==
- Bauckham, Richard (2003). "The Origin of the Ebionites". In Tomson, Peter J.; Lambers-Petry, Doris (eds.). The Image of the Judeo-Christians in Ancient Jewish and Christian Literature. Brill. pp. 162–81. ISBN 978-3-16-148094-2.
- Bellinzoni, Arthur J. (1967). The Sayings of Jesus in the Writings of Justin Martyr. Brill. ASIN B0007ISJW6.
- Bertrand, Daniel A. (1980). "L'Evangile Des Ebionites: Une Harmonie Evangelique Anterieure Au Diatessaron". New Testament Studies (in French). 26 (4). Cambridge University Press: 548–63. doi:10.1017/S0028688500005816. S2CID 170230830.
- Boismard, Marie-Émile (1966). "Évangile des Ébionites et problème synoptique". Revue biblique (in French). 73 (1–4). Lecoffre: 321–52. ISSN 0035-0907.
- Cameron, Ron (1982). The Other Gospels: Non-Canonical Gospel Texts. Westminster/John Knox Press. ISBN 978-0-664-24428-6.
- Edwards, James R. (2009). The Hebrew Gospel and the Development of the Synoptic Tradition. Wm. B. Eerdmans Publishing. ISBN 978-0-8028-6234-1.
- Ehrman, Bart D. (1993). The Orthodox Corruption of Scripture. Oxford University Press. ISBN 0-19-508078-5.
- Ehrman, Bart D. (2005) [2003]. Lost Christianities: The Battles for Scripture and the Faiths We Never Knew. Oxford University Press. p. 102. ISBN 978-0-19-514183-2. "Lost Christianities Ebionites."
- Ehrman, Bart D.; Pleše, Zlatko (2011). "The Gospel of the Ebionites". The Apocryphal Gospels: Texts and Translations. Oxford University Press. pp. 210–5. ISBN 978-0-19-973210-4. "The Apocryphal Gospels Ebionites."
- Elliott, James Keith (2005) [1993]. The Apocryphal New Testament. Oxford University Press. ISBN 978-0-19-826181-0.
- Evans, Craig A. (2007). "The Jewish Christian Gospel Tradition". In Skarsaune, Oskar; Hvalvik, Reidar (eds.). Jewish Believers in Jesus (PDF). Hendrickson Publishers. pp. 241–77. ISBN 978-1-56563-763-4. Archived from the original (PDF) on 17 March 2013.
- Finley, Gregory C. (2009). The Ebionites and "Jewish Christianity": Examining Heresy and the Attitudes of the Church Fathers (PhD Thesis). The Catholic University of America. ISBN 978-1-109-04546-8.
- Goranson, Stephen (1992). "Ebionites". In Freedman, David Noel (ed.). The Anchor Bible Dictionary. Vol. 2 (1 ed.). Doubleday. pp. 260–1. ISBN 978-0-385-42583-4.
- Gregory, Andrew (2008). "Jewish–Christian Gospels". In Foster, Paul (ed.). The Non-Canonical Gospels. T&T Clark. pp. 54–67. ISBN 978-0-567-03302-4.
- Häkkinen, Sakari (2008) [2005]. "Ebionites". In Marjanen, Antti; Luomanen, Petri (eds.). A Companion to Second Century Christian Heretics. Brill. pp. 247–78. ISBN 978-90-04-17038-4.
- Howard, George (1988). "The Gospel of the Ebionites". Aufstieg und Niedergang der Römischen Welt. 2 (25.5). Walter De Gruyter: 4034–53. ISBN 978-3-11-001885-1.
- Jones, F. Stanley (2000). "Ebionites". In Freedman, David Noel; Myers, Allen C.; Beck, Astrid B. (eds.). Eerdman's Dictionary of the Bible. Wm. B. Eerdmans Publishing. p. 364. ISBN 978-0-8028-2400-4.
- Klauck, Hans-Josef (2003). The Apocryphal Gospels: An Introduction. Continuum International Publishing Group. ISBN 978-0-567-08390-6.
- Klijn, Albertus F.J.; Reinink, Gerrit J. (1973). Patristic evidence for Jewish–Christian sects. Brill. ISBN 90-04-03763-2.
- Klijn, Albertus F.J. (1992). Jewish–Christian Gospel Tradition. Brill. ISBN 90-04-09453-9.
- Kloppenborg, John S. (1994) [1992]. "The Gospel of the Ebionites". In Miller, Robert J. (ed.). The Complete Gospels. Polebridge Press. pp. 435–40. ISBN 0-06-065587-9.
- Koch, Glenn Alan (1976). A Critical Investigation of Epiphanius' Knowledge of the Ebionites: A Translation and Critical Discussion of 'Panarion' 30 (PhD thesis). University of Pennsylvania. pp. 1–486. Archived from the original on 8 September 2006.
- Koch, Glenn Alan (1990). "Ebionites, Gospel of the". In Mills, Watson E.; Bullard, Roger Aubrey (eds.). Mercer Dictionary of the Bible. Mercer University Press. pp. 224–5. ISBN 978-0-86554-373-7.
- Koester, Helmut (1990). Ancient Christian Gospels: Their History and Development. Trinity Press. p. 349. ISBN 978-0-334-02459-0.
- Lapham, Fred (2003). An Introduction to the New Testament Apocrypha. Continuum International Publishing Group. ISBN 978-0-8264-6979-3.
- Luomanen, Petri (2007). "Ebionites and Nazarenes". In Jackson-McCabe, Matt (ed.). Jewish Christianity Reconsidered: Rethinking Ancient Groups and Texts. Fortress Press. pp. 81–118. ISBN 978-0-8006-3865-8.
- Luomanen, Petri (2012). Recovering Jewish Christian Sects and Gospels. Brill. ISBN 978-90-04-20971-8.
- Martyn, J.L. (1978). "Clementine Recognitions 1.33 to 71, Jewish Christianity, and the Fourth Gospel". In Jervel, Jacob; Meeks, Wayne A. (eds.). God's Christ and his People. Studies in honor of N.A. Dahl. Universitetsforlaget. ISBN 978-82-00-04979-1.
- Paget, James Carleton (2010). "The Ebionites in recent research". Jews, Christians, and Jewish–Christians in Antiquity. Mohr Siebeck. pp. 325–80. ISBN 978-3-16-150312-2.
- Petersen, William L. (1992). "Ebionites, Gospel of the". In Freedman, David Noel (ed.). The Anchor Bible Dictionary. Vol. 2 (1 ed.). Doubleday. pp. 261–2. ISBN 978-0-385-42583-4.
- Pick, Bernhard (1908). Paralipomena: Remains of Gospels and Sayings of Christ. Bibliolife (republished). ISBN 978-1-113-44804-0. Republished in 2009.
- Puech, Henri-Charles [in French]; Blatz, Beate (1991). "Gospels Attributed to the Apostles". In Schneemelcher, Wilhelm; Wilson, Robert McLachlan (eds.). New Testament Apocrypha. John Knox Press. ISBN 0-664-22721-X.
- Schoeps, Hans-Joachim [in German] (1969). Jewish Christianity: Factional Disputes in the Early Church. Fortress Press. ASIN B0006BYSW4. Archived from the original on 15 October 2013. (translated by Douglas R.A. Hare)
- Simon, Richard (1689). A critical history of the text of the New Testament: wherein is firmly established the truth of those acts on which the foundation of Christian religion is laid. R. Taylor. OCLC 228723131.
- Skarsaune, Oskar (2007). "The Ebionites". In Skarsaune, Oskar; Hvalvik, Reidar (eds.). Jewish Believers in Jesus (PDF). Hendrickson Publishers. pp. 419–62. ISBN 978-1-56563-763-4. Archived from the original (PDF) on 17 March 2013.
- Tuckett, Christopher M. (2012). 2 Clement: Introduction, Text, and Commentary. Oxford University Press. ISBN 978-0-19-969460-0.
- Van Voorst, Robert E. (1989). The Ascents of James: History and Theology of a Jewish–Christian Community. Society of Biblical Literature. ISBN 978-1-55540-293-8.
- Verheyden, Joseph (2003). "Epiphanius on the Ebionites". In Tomson, Peter J.; Lambers-Petry, Doris (eds.). The Image of the Judeo-Christians in Ancient Jewish and Christian Literature. Brill. pp. 182–208. ISBN 978-3-16-148094-2.
- Vielhauer, Philipp; Strecker, Georg [in German] (1991). "Jewish–Christian gospels". In Schneemelcher, Wilhelm; Wilson, Robert McLachlan (eds.). New Testament Apocrypha: Gospels and Related Writings Volume 1 (2 ed.). John Knox Press. pp. 134–78. ISBN 0-664-22721-X. (6th German edition, translated by George Ogg)
- Williams, Frank (1987). The Panarion of Epiphanius of Salamis Book 1 (Sections 1–46). Brill. ISBN 90-04-07926-2.
