= Hebrew Gospel =

Hebrew Gospel can refer to:

- Gospel of the Hebrews, a syncretic Jewish–Christian text believed to have been composed in Koine Greek
- Hebrew Gospel hypothesis, traditions of a version of Matthew's gospel supposed to have been written by him “in the Hebrew language” (Papias)
- Hebrew Gospel of Matthew, 1385, a rabbinical translation of Matthew's gospel
- Bible translations into Hebrew, including a translation of the Gospels into Modern Hebrew
