= Gospel of the Twelve =

Lost gospel called parts of heretical works by Origen

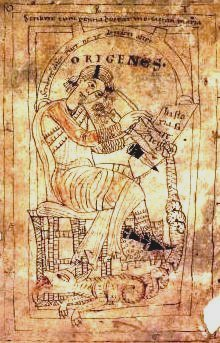
Origen who lists the Gospel of the Twelve

The Gospel of the Twelve (Greek: τὸ τῶν δώδεκα εὐαγγέλιον), possibly also referred to as the Gospel of the Apostles, is a lost gospel mentioned by Origen in Homilies on Luke as part of a list of heretical works.

Schneemelcher's standard edition of the New Testament Apocrypha states that Jerome incorrectly identified the Gospel of the Twelve, which he referred to as the Gospel according to the Apostles, with the Gospel of the Hebrews (Dial. adv. Pelag. III 2), whereas Origen clearly distinguished between them (Homilies on Luke 1.1). Ambrose and Bede may have also made allusions to it. A relationship has been postulated between this otherwise unknown gospel and the Gospel of the Ebionites.

== See also ==
- Jewish-Christian Gospels
- List of Gospels
