= Jewish–Christian gospels =

Gospels of a Jewish Christian character

The Jewish–Christian Gospels were gospels of a Jewish Christian character quoted by Clement of Alexandria, Origen, Eusebius, Epiphanius, Jerome and probably Didymus the Blind. All five call the gospel they know the "Gospel of the Hebrews", but most modern scholars have concluded that the five early church historians are not quoting the same work. As none of the works survive to this day, attempts have been made to reconstruct them from the references in the Church Fathers. The majority of scholars believe that there existed one gospel in Aramaic/Hebrew and at least two in Greek, although a minority argue that there were only two, in Aramaic/Hebrew and in Greek.

In the standard edition of Schneemelcher, he creates three different Jewish–Christian gospels by dividing up the references in the church fathers. Schneemelcher uses the following working names for the three proposed gospels:

- The Gospel of the Ebionites ("GE") – 7 quotations by Epiphanius.
- The Gospel of the Hebrews ("GH") – 1 quotation ascribed to Cyril of Jerusalem, plus GH 2–7 quotations by Clement, Origen, and Jerome.
- The Gospel of the Nazarenes ("GN") – GN 1 to GN 23 are mainly from Jerome; GN 24 to GN 36 are from medieval sources.

The reconstructed texts of the gospels are usually categorized under New Testament apocrypha.

The relationship between the Jewish–Christian gospels and a hypothetical original Hebrew Gospel remains a speculation.

== Overview ==
The Jewish–Christian gospels are known through quotations in the works of the early Church Fathers Clement of Alexandria, Origen, Eusebius, Epiphanius, Jerome and probably Didymus the Blind. These all assumed that only one Jewish Christian gospel existed, although in various versions and languages, which they attributed to well-known sects such as the Ebionites and Nazarenes. The majority of critical scholars have rejected this view and identify at least two and possibly three separate Jewish–Christian gospels. The standard collection of the Jewish–Christian gospels is found in Schneemelcher's New Testament Apocrypha; Schneemelcher, following Hans Waitz, groups the extant sayings into three lost gospels:

- Gospel of the Ebionites, consisting of seven citations by Epiphanius, GE-1 to GE-7
- Gospel of the Hebrews, consisting of seven verses numbered GH-1 to GH-7
- Gospel of the Nazarenes, consisting of citations and marginal notes by Jerome and others GN-1 to GN-36

=== The Gospel of the Ebionites ===
The Gospel of the Ebionites is the name given by modern scholars to a proposed lost gospel thought to lie behind fragments quoted by Epiphanius in his Panarion. Epiphanius quotes a fragment which states that the gospel is narrated by the twelve apostles. It began with the Baptism of Jesus (presumably because the Ebionites denied the Virgin Birth) and included a narrative of the Last Supper. It is thought to have been a gospel harmony based on the Synoptic Gospels composed in Greek in the first half of the 2nd century, and it possibly originated in the Transjordan region (the home of the Ebionites). It is probably the same as the lost Gospel of the Twelve, or Gospel of the Apostles, referred to by Origen and Jerome, respectively.

=== The Gospel of the Hebrews ===
The Gospel of the Hebrews presented traditions of Christ's pre-existence, coming into the world, baptism and temptation, with some of his sayings. It was probably composed in Greek in the first half of the 2nd century and used among Greek-speaking Jewish Christians in Egypt. It is known from fragments preserved chiefly by Clement, Origen and Jerome, and shows a high regard for James, the brother of Jesus and head of the Jewish Christian church in Jerusalem.

=== The Gospel of the Nazarenes ===
The Gospel of the Nazarenes (a modern scholarly name) has been deduced from references in Jerome and Origen. It seems to have much in common with the canonical Gospel of Matthew, and would have been written in Palestinian Aramaic in the first half of the 2nd century for use by Nazarenes in the neighborhood of Beroea near Aleppo in Syria.

== History of scholarship in the Jewish–Christian gospel problem ==
The sources for the Jewish–Christian gospels are the early church fathers of the late 2nd to the early 5th centuries – Clement of Alexandria, Origen, Eusebius, Didymus the Blind, Epiphanius and Jerome. Not all of them were aware that there were different Jewish Christian communities with varying theologies, or that some of them (or at least one) was Aramaic-speaking while others knew only Greek; as a result they frequently confused one gospel with another, and all with a supposed Hebrew version of the Gospel of Matthew.

This confusion has created uncertainty for modern scholars. There is agreement that the fragments cannot be traced back to a Hebrew/Aramaic version or revision of Matthew's gospel, as most of them have no parallel in the canonical gospels. There are good reasons for thinking that there must have been at least two Jewish–Christian gospels, since there are two differing accounts of the baptism and good evidence that some fragments were originally in Aramaic and others in Greek. Most modern scholars have concluded that there was one Jewish–Christian gospel in Aramaic/Hebrew and at least another one in Greek. Some have argued that the total number was three (Bauer, Vielhauer and Strecker, Klijn), others that there were only two (Schlarb and Luhrmann).

== See also ==
- List of Gospels
- Development of the New Testament canon

== Sources ==
- Cameron, Ron (1982). The Other Gospels: Non-Canonical Gospel Texts. Westminster/John Knox. ISBN 978-0-664-24428-6.
- Ehrman, Bart D.; Pleše, Zlatko (2011). "The Jewish Christian Gospels". The Apocryphal Gospels: Texts and Translations. Oxford University Press. pp. 197–216. ISBN 978-0-19-973210-4. "216."
- Elliott, James Keith (2005) [1993]. The Apocryphal New Testament. Oxford University Press. ISBN 978-0-19-826181-0.
- Schlarb, Egbert; Lührmann, Dieter (2000). "Hebräerevangelium". Fragmente apokryph gewordener Evangelien in griechischer und lateinischer Sprache (in German). N.G. Elwert Verlag. ISBN 978-3-7708-1144-1. OL 6868179M.
- Vielhauer, Philipp; Strecker, Georg [in German] (1991). Schneemelcher, Wilhelm; Wilson, Robert McLachlan (eds.). New Testament Apocrypha: Gospels and Related Writings Volume 1 (2 ed.). John Knox Press. ISBN 0-664-22721-X. (6th German edition, translated by George Ogg)
- Yamauchi, Edwin M. (1979). "Apocryphal Gospels". In Bromiley, Geoffrey W. (ed.). International Standard Bible Encyclopedia: A–D Volume 1. Wm. B. Eerdmans. pp. 181–88. ISBN 978-0-8028-3781-3.
