= Gospel of the Hebrews =

Syncretic Jewish–Christian gospel

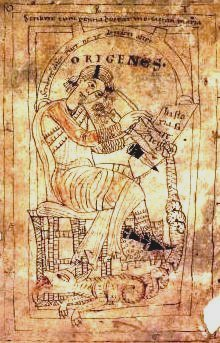
Origen is the ecclesiastical writer most closely associated with using the Gospel of the Hebrews as a prooftext for scriptural exegesis.

The Gospel of the Hebrews (Koine Greek: τὸ καθ' Ἑβραίους εὐαγγέλιον, romanized: tò kath' Hebraíous euangélion), or Gospel according to the Hebrews, is a lost Jewish–Christian gospel. The text of the gospel is lost, with only fragments of it surviving as brief quotations by the early Church Fathers and in apocryphal writings. The fragments contain traditions of Jesus' pre-existence, incarnation, baptism, and probably of his temptation, along with some of his sayings. Distinctive features include a Christology characterized by the belief that the Holy Spirit is Jesus' Divine Mother and a first resurrection appearance to James, the brother of Jesus, showing high regard for James as the leader of the Jewish Christian church in Jerusalem. It was probably composed in Greek in the first decades of the 2nd century and is believed to have been used by Greek-speaking Jewish Christians in Egypt during that century.

The Gospel of the Hebrews is the only Jewish–Christian gospel that the Church Fathers referred to by name, believing there was only one Hebrew Gospel, perhaps in different versions. This has created confusion as most modern scholars believe that the Church Fathers were, in reality, quoting three different gospels. (But the existence of 2, or only 1 gospel have also been argued for).

All are known today only from fragments preserved in quotations by the early Church Fathers. Many modern scholars have given these three different gospels the working name Gospel of the Hebrews, the Gospel of the Nazarenes, and the Gospel of the Ebionites.

Passages from the gospel of the Hebrews were quoted or summarized by three Alexandrian Fathers – Clement, Origen and Didymus the Blind; it was also quoted by Jerome, either directly or through the commentaries of Origen.

The gospel was used as a supplement to the canonical gospels to provide source material for their commentaries based on scripture. Eusebius included it in his list of disputed writings known as the Antilegomena, noting that it was used by "Hebrews" within the Church; it fell out of use when the New Testament canon was codified at the end of the 4th century.

== Origin and characteristics ==
The Gospel of the Hebrews, as known to scholars, is thought to have been composed in Greek. The provenance has been associated with Egypt; (Note: Klijn 1992, p. 42 – "The GH is an authentic product of Egyptian Christianity.") it probably began circulating in Alexandria, Egypt, in the first decades of the 2nd century and was used by Greek-speaking Jewish–Christian communities there. The communities to which they belonged were traditional, conservative Christians who followed the teaching of the early Jewish Christian church in Jerusalem, integrating their understanding of Jesus with strict observance of Jewish customs and law, which they regarded as essential to salvation. Despite this, the gospel displays no connection with other Jewish–Christian literature, nor does it appear to be based on the Greek rendition of the Gospel of Matthew (Note: Jones 2000, pp. 709–10; Matthew, while not itself a Jewish–Christian gospel, draws on Jewish–Christian sources) or the other canonical gospels of what is now orthodox Christianity. Instead, it seems to be taken from alternative oral forms of the same underlying traditions. Some of the fragments suggest a syncretic gnostic influence, while others support close ties to traditional Jewish Wisdom literature.

== Content ==
The Gospel of the Hebrews is preserved in fragments quoted or summarized by various early Church Fathers. The full extent of the original gospel is unknown; according to a list of canonical and apocryphal works drawn up in the 9th century, known as the Stichometry of Nicephorus, the gospel was 2,200 lines, just 300 lines shorter than Matthew. Based on the surviving fragments, the overall structure of the gospel appears to have been similar to the canonical ones. It consisted of a narrative of the life of Jesus which included his baptism, temptation, transfiguration, Last Supper, crucifixion, and resurrection. There was no virgin birth narrative or genealogy of Jesus. The gospel also contained sayings of Jesus. The events in the life of Jesus have been interpreted in a way that reflects Jewish ideas present in a Hellenistic cultural environment.

There is wide agreement about seven quotations cited by Philipp Vielhauer in the critical 3rd German edition of Wilhelm Schneemelcher's New Testament Apocrypha, translated by George Ogg. The translations below follow Vielhauer's order: (Note: Vielhauer & Strecker 1991, pp. 177–8; Material in italics are quotations from the Gospel of the Hebrews, and the material in normal type-face in fragments 6 and 7 is from Jerome.) (Note: Elliott 2005, pp. 5, 9–10; Ehrman 2005b, pp. 15–6; and Klijn 1992, p. 31; all omit fragment 1.)

[Fragment 1] When Christ wished to come upon the earth to men, the good Father summoned a mighty power in heaven, which was called Michael, and entrusted Christ to the care thereof. And the power came into the world and was called Mary, and Christ was in her womb seven months.

— Cyril of Jerusalem, Discourse on Mary Theotokos 12

[Fragment 2] And it came to pass when the Lord was come up out of the water, the whole fount of the Holy Spirit descended upon him and rested on him and said to him: My Son, in all the prophets was I waiting for thee that thou shouldest come and I might rest in thee. For thou art my rest; thou art my first-begotten Son that reignest for ever.

— Jerome, Commentary on Isaiah 4

Fragment 2 uses the language of Jewish Wisdom literature, (Note: Kloppenborg 1994, pp. 427–34 Wisdom of Solomon 7.27 Wisdom of Sirach 24.6–7) but applies it to the Holy Spirit: the Spirit has waited through all the prophets for the Son. The "rest" that the Holy Spirit finds in the Son may reflect the Christian gnostic idea of the pre-existent Redeemer who finally becomes incarnate in Jesus. (Note: Vielhauer & Strecker 1991, pp. 174–6; p. 174 – "This is also the objective of the pre-existent Redeemer who, according to the Jewish–Christian–gnostic Kerygmata Petrou, after endless change in form becomes the incarnate in Jesus: 'From the beginning of the world he runs through the ages, changing his form at the same time as his name, until in his time, anointed of God's mercy for his toil, he shall find his rest forever.' (ps.Clem. Hom. 3.20.2) To the circle of such gnostic speculations belongs the Christology of the baptism pericope of the GH.")

[Fragment 3] Even so did my mother, the Holy Spirit, take me by one of my hairs and carry me away on to the great mountain Tabor.

— Origen, Commentary on John 2.12.87

Fragments 2 and 3 identify Jesus as the son of the Holy Spirit; this idea is found also in the Egyptian Coptic Epistle of James, another indication of the Egyptian origin of the gospel. (Note: Vielhauer & Strecker 1991, pp. 150, 174–6; Vielhauer includes fragment 1 with reservations, p. 150 – "it is questionable whether it actually goes back to Cyril, and above all whether the citation comes from the GH". Klijn 1992, pp. 134–7; Klijn concludes it is not from one of the Jewish–Christian gospels and suggests the Gospel of Peter as a possible source.)

[Fragment 4a] He that marvels shall reign, and he that has reigned shall rest.

— Clement, Stromateis 2.9.45.5

[Fragment 4b] He that seeks will not rest till he finds; and he that has found shall marvel; and he that has marveled shall reign; and he that has reigned shall rest.

— Clement, Stromateis 5.14.96.3

Fragment 4 is a "chain-saying", seek–find–marvel–reign–rest, describing the steps towards salvation, where "rest" equals the state of salvation. The saying is similar to themes found in Jewish Wisdom literature, (Note: Kloppenborg 1994, pp. 427–34; Wisdom of Solomon 6.20, Wisdom of Sirach 6.26–28) and the similarity to a saying in the Gospel of Thomas suggests that the text may have been influenced by Wisdom teaching. (Note: Klauck 2003, p. 39 – "The logion contains an intentional paradox: only the restless activity of seeking leads to the rest for which one yearns." (For further details, see p. 39 table comparing Strom. 2.45.5 and Strom. 5.96.3 with GThom 2 and POxy 645.5–9.))

[Fragment 5] And never be ye joyful, save when ye behold your brother with love.

— Jerome, Commentary on Ephesians 3

[Fragment 6] In the Gospel according to the Hebrews...there is counted among the most grievous offenses: He that has grieved the spirit of his brother.

— Jerome, Commentary on Ezekiel 6

Fragments 5 (on Ephesians 5.4) and 6 (on Ezekiel 18.7) are ethical sayings of Jesus, suggesting that such teachings formed a significant part of the gospel.

[Fragment 7] The Gospel according to the Hebrews...records after the resurrection: And when the Lord had given the linen cloth to the servant of the priest, he went to James and appeared to him. For James had sworn that he would not eat bread from that hour in which he had drunk the cup of the Lord until he should see him risen from among them that sleep. And shortly thereafter the Lord said: Bring a table and bread! And immediately it is added: He took the bread, blessed it and brake it and gave it to James the Just and said to him: My brother, eat thy bread, for the Son of man is risen from among them that sleep.

— Jerome, De viris illustribus 2

Fragment 7 emphasizes the importance of James, the brother of Jesus and head of the Jewish–Christian movement in Jerusalem after Jesus' death, thereby testifying to the Jewish character of the community of the gospel.

In addition to direct quotations, other gospel stories were summarized or cited by the Church Fathers. The translations below are from Vielhauer & Strecker (1991), except "b2" which is from Klauck (2003): (Note: Ehrman 2005b, pp. 15–6 includes fragment "a". Elliott 2005, pp. 5, 9–10 includes fragment "b1/b2". Vielhauer & Strecker 1991, pp. 138, 175 includes fragments "a" and "b1" ("b2" is not mentioned). Klijn 1992, pp. 31, 116–9 includes fragment "a" and discusses fragment "b1/b2" separately, stating that its inclusion in the gospel is possible but not definitive.)

[Fragment a] (The Scripture) seems to call Matthew "Levi" in the Gospel of Luke. Yet it is not a question of one and the same person. Rather Matthias, who was installed (as apostle) in place of Judas, and Levi are the same person with a double name. This is clear from the Gospel of the Hebrews.

— Didymus the Blind, Commentary on the Psalms 184.9–10

The summary of a gospel passage identifies Matthias (which is the Greek form of Matthew, from Hebrew Matityahu, meaning "gift of God") as the name of the tax-collector who was called to follow Jesus. (Note: Lührmann 2004, pp. 183–91, 234–5; Lührmann has a detailed analysis and discussion of the "call of Levi" story.)

[Fragment b1] And he (Papias) has adduced another story of a woman who was accused of many sins before the Lord, which is contained in the Gospel according to the Hebrews.

— Eusebius, Historia ecclesiastica 3.39.17

The citation by Eusebius of a story he found in the writings of Papias is believed to refer to an alternate version of the account in John's gospel of Jesus and the woman taken in adultery.

[Fragment b2] It is related in some gospels that a woman was condemned by the Jews because of a sin and was taken to the customary place of stoning, in order that she might be stoned. We are told that when the Savior caught sight of her and saw that they were ready to stone her, he said to those who wanted to throw stones at her: Let the one who has not sinned, lift a stone and throw it. If someone is certain that he has not sinned, let him take a stone and hit her. And no one dared to do so. When they examined themselves and they recognized that they too bore responsibility for certain actions, they did not dare to stone her.

— Didymus the Blind, Commentary on Ecclesiastes 4.223.6–13

Although Didymus does not name his source, he found this independent tradition of the story of the sinful woman in a non-canonical gospel in Alexandria which may have been the Gospel of the Hebrews. (Note: Klauck 2003, pp. 40–1; Klauck, p. 41 – "It is probably not an abbreviated version of Jn 8:3–11, but an independent variant tradition, found by Didymus in a non-canonical gospel which was available in Alexandria." (for a detailed analysis and discussion, see Lührmann 2004, pp. 191–215, 236–7).)

== Christology ==
The theology of the gospel is strongly influenced by Jewish–Christian wisdom teaching. The Holy Spirit is represented as a manifestation of Divine Wisdom who is called "Mother". (Note: Klijn 1992, p. 39 – "The theological conception of this Gospel is dominated by Jewish–Christian Wisdom Theology. Wisdom is represented in this Gospel by the Holy Spirit who is called "Mother". [...] "The Spirit descends upon man but according to this Gospel, it is Jesus in particular who is looked for. Anybody who possesses the Spirit may be called Son but Jesus is the Son with a very special mission. One of the characteristics of the Spirit is that a man starts a new life during which he gradually comes nearer to his destination. The final stage is to reign and rest. In this situation man has arrived at a point at which he is invulnerable to evil forces which are now subjected to him. After his baptism Jesus is said to reign for eternity.") The feminine aspect of the Spirit is an indication of Semitic influence on the language of the gospel. The Spirit takes Jesus to Mount Tabor by a single hair, echoing Old Testament themes in the stories of Ezekiel (Ezekiel 8:3) and Habbakuk (Dan. 14:36 LXX). (Note: Klauck 2003, p. 40; Chapter 14 is an apocryphal addition to Daniel in the Greek text of the LXX known as Bel and the Dragon.) The gospel emphasizes the fulfillment of the prophecy of Isaiah 11:2 in Jesus' baptism, but also adopts elements of Jewish Wisdom theology. (Note: Klijn 1992, p. 55 – "For example, we find in Philo, de ebr. 30 'One mentions father and mother together, but their significance is different. Thus we shall, for example, call the creator rightly also Father of what has come into existence, but Mother the knowledge of him who created. With her God has lived together and she has brought forth creation, but not in the way of men. She, however, received God's seed and she brought forth the only beloved perceptible son, this world, as a ripe fruit with pains.' This idea was taken over by Christian tradition. Wisdom is held to have sons not only in Sir. 4.11, but also according to Luke 7.35. ... This means that the passage has to be understood against the background of Jewish Hellenistic traditions.") The Spirit has been gathered in one place at the moment of Jesus' baptism, so that he has become the only Son of the Spirit in which he has found eternal "rest" and reigns forever. The "seek–find" and "rule–rest" language also comes from Jewish Wisdom tradition as stages on the way to salvation during which the believer is encouraged to emulate divine Wisdom. (Note: Kloppenborg 1994, p. 428,433; Kloppenborg, p. 433 – "Whoever marvels will rule is a concept from Jewish wisdom tradition: 'The desire for wisdom leads to ruling' (Wis. 6.20).")

The "rest" that the Holy Spirit waits for and finally finds in the Son is also found in Gnostic speculations. The wisdom chain-saying which describes the progression of seeking, marveling, and finding salvation, is similar to the Hermetic conception of salvation found in the Alexandrian Corpus Hermeticum. (Note: Lapham 2003, p. 160 – Quotation from the Corpus Hermeticum: "Tis from Thy Aeon I have found praise-giving, and in Thy will, the object of my search, have I found rest." (C.H. 13.20)) (Note: Vielhauer & Strecker 1991, pp. 174–6; p. 175 – "The chain saying ... with its climax 'seek–find–reign–rest' points to the same religious milieu (of gnostic speculations). ... (It) describes the steps of revelation of salvation and of the way of salvation. This description is characteristic of the Hermetic gnosis, ... here also 'to marvel' is found as a step (Corp. Hermet. 4.2,14.4) and the 'rest' as escatological salvation (Corp. Hermet. 9.10,13.20). ... Because of the scantiness of the material we cannot say how strongly this mystic-gnostic religiosity has influenced the GH, whether it is an essential or merely an infused element.") "Rest" is not only to be understood as the ultimate goal of the seeker after truth, which leads to salvation; it is also descriptive of a unity with the wisdom which lies at the heart of the Godhead. The "resting" of the Holy Spirit at the moment of Jesus' Baptism may also be understood in this timeless sense, as the union and rest of the pre-existent Son with his Father, in keeping with the Gnostic conception of "rest" as the highest gift of salvation. (Note: Lapham 2003, pp. 160–2; Lapham, p. 162 – "The importance of this passage lies in the christological insights it affords. In one sense it might be taken to imply the pre-existence of the Son, rather than his adoption at the moment of his baptism. From the beginning of time ('in all the prophets') the Father had awaited the eschatological moment of the union and rest with his pre-existent Son. ... It is this concept of unity within the Godhead that underlies this pericope from the Gospel of the Hebrews.")

== Reception ==
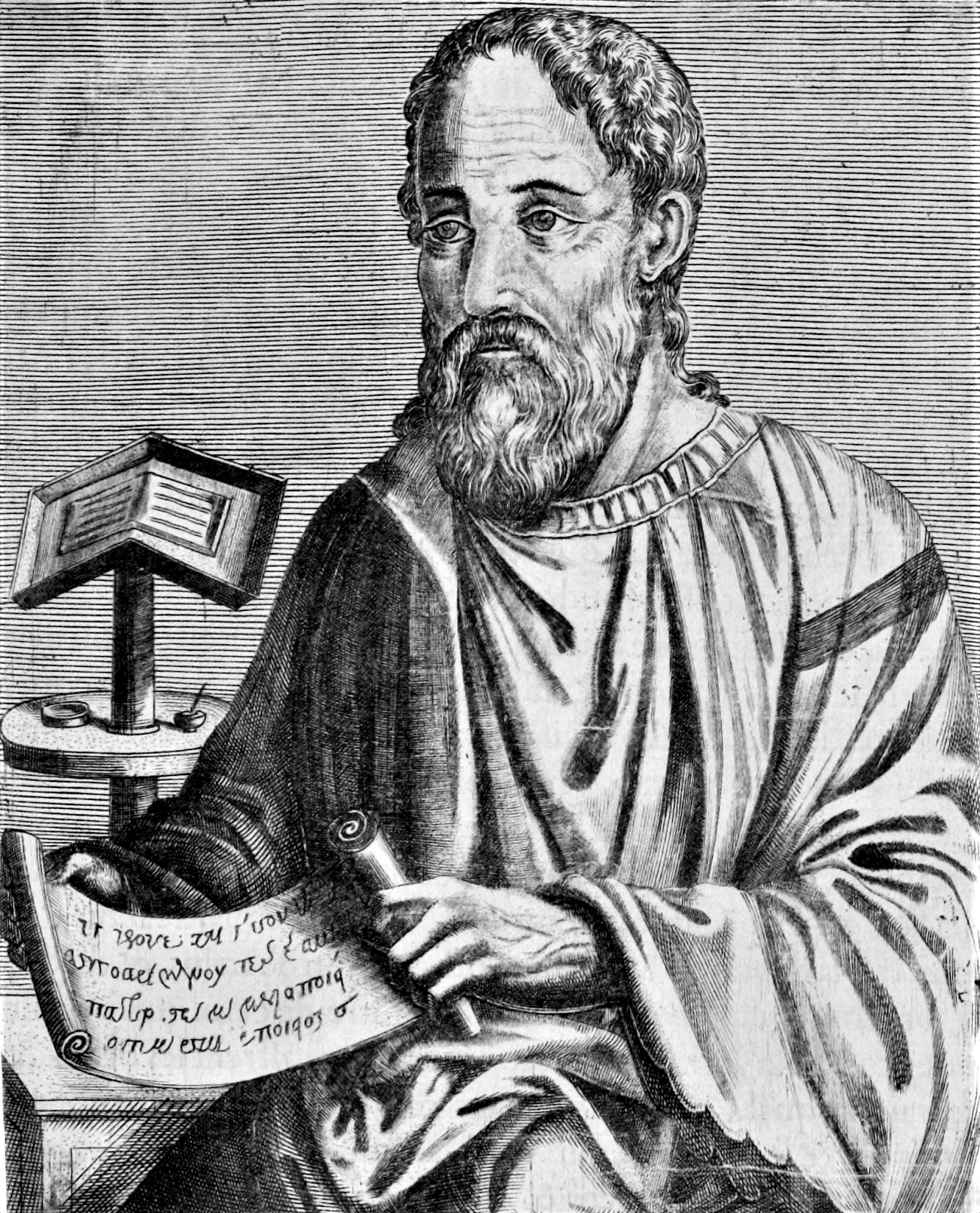
Eusebius of Caesarea's list of disputed writings, known as the Antilegomena, included the Gospel of the Hebrews.

Eusebius listed the Gospel of the Hebrews in his Antilegomena as one of the disputed writings of the early Church. (Note: Ehrman 2005a, pp. 164–8, 243–4; Ehrman 2005b, pp. 337–9; Ehrman offers a popular account of the canon of Eusebius and the controversies of the 4th century Church which led up to the closing of the canon.) (Note: Metzger 1997, pp. 203–5; Eusebius places the Gospel of the Hebrews in the list of disputed writings he refers to as notha, or spurious. He classifies books of this type as orthodox but uncanonical because they were not believed to be written by the apostles or their immediate followers – Schneemelcher 1991, p. 47; "Moreover, many have also reckoned among these writings the Gospel according to the Hebrews, in which those especially from among the Hebrews who have accepted Christ find delight" (Eusebius, Hist. eccl. 3.25.5).) Despite this, the Church Fathers occasionally used it, with reservations, as a source to support their exegetical arguments. Eusebius reports that the 2nd century Church Father Hegesippus used the gospel as a source for writing his Hypomneumata ("Memoranda") in Rome (c. 175–180). (Note: Skarsaune 2007, pp. 18, 338–44; Eusebius briefly summarizes the contents of a heresiology of Jewish, Jewish–Christian, and Gnostic sects contained in the Hypomneumata (Hist. eccl. 4.22.5–7), and immediately afterward, offers an assurance of the testimony of Hegesippus as follows: "He sets down certain things from the Gospel of the Hebrews and the Syriac (Gospel) and, in particular, from (writings in) the Hebrew tongue, thus showing that that he was himself a believer of Hebrew origin. And he relates other matters as well, on the strength of unwritten Jewish tradition." (Hist. eccl. 4.22.8)) The Alexandrian Fathers – Clement, Origen, and Didymus the Blind – relied directly on the gospel to provide prooftexts as a supplement to the canonical gospels. Clement quoted from the gospel as part of a discourse on divine Wisdom. (Note: Klijn 1992, pp. 4–8; In a commentary on divine Wisdom, Clement attempts to reconcile Platonic philosophy with Christian wisdom tradition. He states that, unlike the philosophical virtues, wisdom that teaches truth is a power from God. Clement quotes from Plato (Theaetetus 155) to emphasize that astonishment is the beginning of philosophy and from the Traditions of Matthias to emphasize that this is the first step to knowledge. He reinforces the point by quoting the second half of the wisdom chain-saying in the Gospel of the Hebrews, concluding from these readings that the "unlearned man" can never be a philosopher.) Origen used it to compare differing views of the relationship between the Word and the Holy Spirit. (Note: Klijn 1992, pp. 4–8; In his commentary on John 1:1–3, Origen disagrees with the theology of the Gospel of the Hebrews, which places the Holy Spirit over the Word, but rather than refute it, he creates a new argument based on scripture to reconcile the difference between the two gospels. Origen resolves the difficulty using Matthew 12.50, which says that all who do the will of the Father are the brothers, sisters, and mother of Jesus. By arguing this also applies to the divine world, he reasons the Holy Spirit is called Mother because she has done the will of the Father.) Jerome claimed to have used the gospel as a prooftext, although he may have relied in part on excerpts from the commentaries of Origen. He quoted from it as a proof from prophecy based on Isaiah 11:2 to explain how Jesus was the fulfillment of messianic expectations. (Note: Klijn 1992, pp. 16–9, 31, 98–101; As part of his commentary on Isaiah (Comm. Isa. 4), Jerome uses the baptismal theophany from the Gospel of the Hebrews to demonstrate that Jesus is the fulfillment of messianic expectations with a proof from prophecy based on Isaiah 11.2. See Evans 2007, pp. 255–6 The gospel quotation is part of a larger collection of prooftexts on the salvation history of Israel in which Jerome incorporates quotations from a commentary on Isaiah he claimed to have received from the Nazarenes (Comm. Isa. 3.26 on Isa. 8.11–15; Comm. Isa. 3.29 on Isa. 8.19–22; Comm. Isa. 3.30 on Isa. 9.1).) The Gospel of the Hebrews was excluded from the canon by the early Church with the closing of the New Testament canon at the end of the 4th century, and was no longer cited as a source in Church literature. (Note: Metzger 1997, pp. 236–8, 314–5; The canon of the Catholic Church containing the 27 books of the New Testament was ratified at the Third Council of Carthage in 397 for confirmation by the Church of Rome, reaffirming an earlier decision reached at the Synod of Hippo in 393. Bruce 1988, p. 234; A letter by Pope Innocent I to Exsuperius, bishop of Toulouse in 405 confirms the canon list, adding that whatever other books there may be should be rejected and condemned. Metzger 1997, pp. 169–70; Metzger, p. 170 – "we can understand why its (the Gospel of the Hebrews) use was limited, chiefly among Jewish Christians (some of whom were regarded as heretical), and passed over by the Great Church in the period when the canon was closed.")

Subsequent to the closing of the canon, the gospel is mentioned in a homily "On the Virgin Mary and Her Birth" attributed to Cyril of Jerusalem in a collection of apocryphal stories believed to have been written in Coptic in the first half of the 6th century. The author (known to scholars as Pseudo-Cyril) refers to the Gospel of the Hebrews in a polemical dialogue between a monk and Cyril over the nature of Mary, whom the monk contends was a divine power sent from heaven. Cyril condemns the monk's teaching as a heresy, which the author attributes to Carpocrates, Satornilus, and the Ebionites. (Note: van den Broek 2013, pp. 93–7; pp. 94,97 – van den Broek regards the attribution of the monk's 'quotation' to the Gospel of the Hebrews to be spurious and motivated by the author's belief that it was written by Jews to distort the doctrines of the Church.) (Note: Budge 1977, p. 637; The English translation of the Coptic text by Wallis Budge contains the full quotation. "It is written in the Gospel of the Hebrews that when Christ wished to come upon the earth to men the Good Father called a mighty power in the heavens which was called Michael, and committed Christ to the care thereof. And the power came down into the world, and it was called Mary, and [Christ] was in her womb for seven months. Afterwards she gave birth to Him, and He increased in stature, and He chose the Apostles, who preached Him in every place. He fulfilled the appointed time that was decreed for Him. And the Jews became envious of Him, they hated Him, they changed the custom of their Law, and they rose up against Him and laid a trap and caught Him, and they delivered Him to the governor, and he gave Him to them to crucify Him. And after they had raised Him up on the Cross the Father took Him up into heaven unto Himself.") Not all later mentions of the gospel were polemical; Bede (c. 673–735), after listing some apocryphal gospels rejected by the Church, includes the Gospel of the Hebrews among the "ecclesiastical histories" and refers to its usage by Jerome. (Note: Klijn 1992, pp. 23–4; Edwards 2009, p. 40; Bede appears to have no direct knowledge of the gospel and is dependent upon Jerome. Edwards translates the Latin text of Bede as follows: "Here it must be noted that the Gospel according to the Hebrews, as it is called, is not to be reckoned among the apocryphal but among ecclesiastical histories; for it seemed good even to the translator of Holy Scripture himself, Jerome, to cite many testimonies from it, and to translate it into the Latin and Greek language.")

== Relationship to other texts ==
The early Church Fathers believed there was only one Jewish–Christian gospel, perhaps in different versions; however, scholars have long recognized the possibility there were at least two or three. Jerome's references to a Gospel of the Hebrews, or variants of that name, are particularly problematic because it is unclear which gospel he is referring to as the source of his quotations. Hegesippus, Eusebius, and Jerome all used an Aramaic gospel, which Jerome referred to as the gospel used by a Jewish Christian sect known as the Nazarenes. (Note: Klijn 1992, pp. 12–3, 16–9, 29–32, 60–5; See Klijn: p. 12 – Eusebius reports in his ecclesiastical history that Hegesippus used a Syriac (Aramaic) gospel as a source for his Hypomneumata (for additional details on Hegesippus, see Skarsaune 2007, pp. 18, 338–44). pp. 13,29–32 – Eusebius cites an unnamed Aramaic gospel written in Hebrew letters as a source for his Theophaneia. pp. 60–5 – He quotes a saying of Jesus ('I choose for myself the good ones, the good ones whom my Father in heaven has given me') to expound on the reasons for divisions within the Church (Theophaneia 4.12), and he comments on a variant version of the Parable of the Talents in Mt. 25.14–30 (Theophaneia 4.22). pp. 16–9,29–32 – Jerome is our major source of knowledge about the content of an Aramaic gospel. He quoted from an unnamed gospel in Hebrew script as a source for several commentaries (for further details on Jerome's citations by date, see Skarsaune 2007, pp. 541–9).) The Gospel of the Nazarenes is the name adopted by scholars to describe the fragments of quotations believed to originate from an Aramaic gospel that was based on traditions similar to the Gospel of Matthew. A third gospel was known only to Epiphanius of Salamis, which he attributed to a second Jewish Christian group known as the Ebionites. (Note: Klijn 1992, pp. 14–6, 28–9; Epiphanius mistakenly believed it to be an abridged and corrupted Hebrew version of the Gospel of Matthew, which he also referred to as the "Hebrew" gospel or Gospel of the Hebrews.) Scholars have conventionally referred to seven fragments of a Greek gospel harmony preserved in quotations by Epiphanius as the Gospel of the Ebionites. The existence of three independent Jewish–Christian gospels with distinct characteristics has been regarded as an established consensus. (Note: Klijn 1992, pp. 30, 41; Klijn, p. 30 – "Our conclusion is that from the various references in Christian authors three Jewish–Christian Gospels can be traced. They belong to three individual Jewish–Christian circles." p. 41 – "The presence of three Jewish–Christian Gospels is an established fact.") However, that conclusion has recently been challenged with respect to the composition of the gospel known to the Nazarenes and its relationship to the Gospel of the Hebrews. (Note: Klauck 2003, p. 37 – "It has become almost canonical in twentieth-century scholarship to speak of three Jewish–Christian gospels: a Gospel of the Hebrews (EvHeb), a Gospel of the Nazaraeans (EvNaz) and a Gospel of the Ebionites (EvEb) ...Textual attestation of EvNaz is attained by dividing passages in Jerome between EvHeb and EvNaz." ... "Materials which earlier scholars had apportioned between EvHeb and EvNaz are now attributed to EvHeb alone, so that we are left with only two Jewish–Christian gospels, EvEb and EvHeb. Against this hypothesis, however, it must be pointed out that we possess three extra-canonical narratives of the baptism of Jesus which vary to such an extent that they cannot come from one or even two gospels alone. Rather, they presuppose three independent contexts." ... "I add a question mark in brackets to the title EvNaz, in order to indicate the precarious status of this text." (For a rebuttal to Klauck's assertion and more details on the 3GH vs. alternative hypotheses, see Gregory 2008, pp. 56–61; Gregory, p. 58 – "Thus the question of whether or not there was ever a Gospel of the Nazoraeans should be considered as remaining very much open".)) Others suggest that these three titles may have been referring to one and the same book. The relationship between the Gospel of the Hebrews and the other Jewish–Christian gospels, as well as a hypothetical original Hebrew Gospel, is uncertain and has been an ongoing subject of scholarly investigation.

== See also ==
- Gospel of the Nazarenes
- Gospel of the Ebionites
- List of Gospels
- Jewish–Christian gospels

== Sources ==
- Bruce, F.F. (1988). The Canon of Scripture. Inter-Varsity Press. ISBN 978-0-8308-1258-5.
- Budge, E. A. Wallis (1977) [1915]. "Discourse on Mary Theotokos by Cyril, Archbishop of Jerusalem". Coptic Texts: Miscellaneous Coptic texts in the dialect of Upper Egypt, Part 2 Volume 5. AMS Press. ISBN 978-0-404-11556-2.
- Cameron, Ron (1982). The Other Gospels: Non-Canonical Gospel Texts. Westminster/John Knox. ISBN 978-0-664-24428-6.
- Cameron, Ron (1992). "Hebrews, Gospel of the". In Freedman, David Noel (ed.). The Anchor Bible Dictionary. Vol. 3 (1 ed.). Doubleday. pp. 105–6. ISBN 978-0-385-42583-4.
- Edwards, James R. (2009). The Hebrew Gospel and the Development of the Synoptic Tradition. Wm. B. Eerdmans. ISBN 978-0-8028-6234-1.
- Ehrman, Bart D. (2005a) [2003]. Lost Christianities. Oxford University Press. ISBN 978-0-19-518249-1.
- Ehrman, Bart D. (2005b) [2003]. Lost Scriptures (PDF). Oxford University Press. ISBN 978-0-19-518250-7.
- Ehrman, Bart D.; Pleše, Zlatko (2011). "The Gospel according to the Hebrews". The Apocryphal Gospels: Texts and Translations. Oxford University Press. pp. 216–21. ISBN 978-0-19-973210-4. "216."
- Elliott, James Keith (2005) [1993]. The Apocryphal New Testament. Oxford University Press. ISBN 978-0-19-826181-0.
- Evans, Craig A. (2007). "The Jewish Christian Gospel Tradition". In Skarsaune, Oskar; Hvalvik, Reidar (eds.). Jewish Believers in Jesus (PDF). Hendrickson Publishers. pp. 241–77. ISBN 978-1-56563-763-4. Archived from the original (PDF) on 17 March 2013.
- Gregory, Andrew (2008). "Jewish–Christian Gospels". In Foster, Paul (ed.). The Non-Canonical Gospels. T&T Clark. pp. 54–67. ISBN 978-0-567-03302-4.
- Howard, George (2000). "Hebrews, Gospel According to the". In Freedman, David Noel; Myers, Allen C (eds.). Eerdmans Dictionary of the Bible. Wm. B. Eerdmans. ISBN 978-0-8028-2400-4.
- Jones, F. Stanley (2000). "Jewish Christians". In Freedman, David Noel; Myers, Allen C. (eds.). Eerdmans Dictionary of the Bible. Wm. B. Eerdmans. ISBN 978-0-8028-2400-4.
- Klauck, Hans-Josef (2003). The Apocryphal Gospels: An Introduction. Continuum. ISBN 978-0-567-08390-6.
- Klijn, A.F.J.; Reinink, G.J. (1973). Patristic Evidence for Jewish-Christian Sects. Leiden: E.J. Brill. ISBN 978-9-00403763-2. OCLC 1076236746 – via Internet Archive. Alt URL
- Klijn, Albertus F.J. (1992). Jewish–Christian Gospel Tradition. Brill. ISBN 90-04-09453-9.
- Kloppenborg, John S. (1994) [1992]. "The Gospel of the Hebrews". In Miller, Robert J. (ed.). The Complete Gospels. Polebridge Press. pp. 427–34. ISBN 0-06-065587-9.
- Koch, Glenn Alan (1990). "Hebrews, Gospel of the". In Mills, Watson E.; Bullard, Roger Aubrey (eds.). Mercer Dictionary of the Bible. Mercer University Press. p. 364. ISBN 978-0-86554-373-7.
- Lapham, Fred (2003). An Introduction to the New Testament Apocrypha. Continuum. ISBN 978-0-8264-6979-3.
- Lührmann, Dieter [in German] (2004). Die Apokryph Gewordenen Evangelien: Studien Zu Neuen Texten Und Zu Neuen Fragen (in German). Brill. ISBN 978-90-04-12867-5.
- MacDonald, Dennis R. (2012). Two Shipwrecked Gospels: The Logoi of Jesus and Papias's Exposition of Logia about the Lord. Society of Biblical Lit. ISBN 978-1-58983-691-4.
- Metzger, Bruce M. (1997) [1987]. The Canon of the New Testament:Its Origin, Development, and Significance. Oxford University Press. ISBN 978-0-19-160687-8.
- Schneemelcher, Wilhelm (1991). "General Introduction". In Schneemelcher, Wilhelm; Wilson, Robert McLachlan (eds.). New Testament Apocrypha, Volume 1: Gospels and Related Writings (2 ed.). John Knox Press. pp. 9–75. ISBN 0-664-22721-X. (6th German edition, translated by George Ogg)
- Skarsaune, Oskar (2007). "Fragments of Jewish Christian Literature Quoted in Some Greek and Latin Fathers". In Skarsaune, Oskar; Hvalvik, Reidar (eds.). Jewish Believers in Jesus (PDF). Hendrickson Publishers. pp. 325–78. ISBN 978-1-56563-763-4. Archived from the original (PDF) on 17 March 2013.
- van den Broek, Roelof (2013). Pseudo-Cyril of Jerusalem on the Life and the Passion of Christ: A Coptic Apocryphon. Brill. ISBN 978-90-04-23757-5.
- Vielhauer, Philipp (1963). "Jewish Christian Gospels". In Schneemelcher, Wilhelm; Wilson, Robert McLachlan (eds.). New Testament Apocrypha, Volume 1: Gospels and Related Writings (1 ed.). Westminster Press. pp. 117–65. ISBN 0-664-20385-X. (3rd German edition, translated by George Ogg)
- Vielhauer, Philipp; Strecker, Georg [in German] (1991). "Jewish Christian Gospels". In Schneemelcher, Wilhelm; Wilson, Robert McLachlan (eds.). New Testament Apocrypha, Volume 1: Gospels and Related Writings (2 ed.). Westminster/John Knox Press. pp. 134–78. ISBN 0-664-22721-X. (6th German edition, translated by George Ogg)
