= Klijn =

Klijn is a Dutch family name. The most common derivation is being a variant of "Klein" from the word meaning "small". In some dialects, Klien and some similar forms mean a kind of peat, so it may be an occupational surname for a peat digger. The latter meaning produced the Frisian surnames Klijnstra and Klijnsma, with characteristic occupational endings. Notable people with the surname include:

- Albertus Klijn (1923–2012), Dutch scholar of New Testament Apocrypha
- Lorena Klijn (born 1987), Dutch kickboxer
- René Klijn, Dutch singer and model

On the Dutch and German Wikipedias:

- nl:Albert Klijn (1895–1881) Dutch artist
- nl:Corné Klijn (born 1961), Dutch radio DJ
- de:Debbie Klijn (born 1975), Dutch handball player
- nl:Judith de Klijn (born 1967), Dutch TV
- nl:Tim Klijn (born 1979), Dutch DJ
