= Aramaic gospel =

The term Aramaic Gospel may refer to:

- Aramaic New Testament, the existing 4 Gospels in the Peshitta, usually considered a translation from the Greek
- Aramaic Gospel hypothesis (also known as the Proto-Gospel hypothesis), of a lost Aramaic source gospel
