= James R. Edwards =

American theologian and New Testament scholar

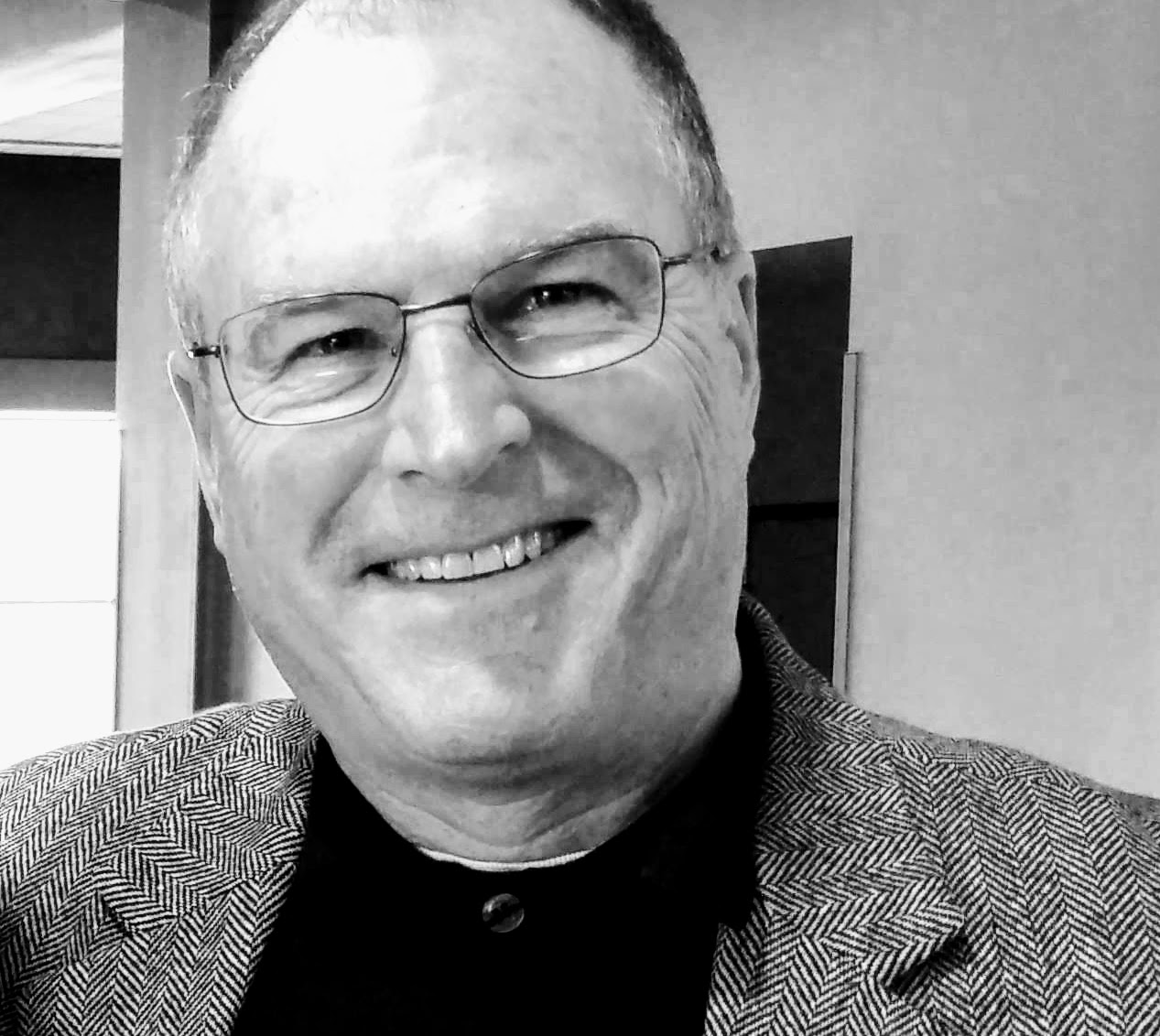
- Theologian James Edwards
- Born: 1945 (age 80–81)
- Occupations: Theologian and New Testament scholar
- Title: Professor Emeritus of Theology
- Awards: Templeton Grant in Science and Religion (1996); recipient of Deutsche Akademische Austausch Dienst Award (1993)

Academic background
- Education: Whitworth University, Princeton Theological Seminary, University of Zürich, University of Tübingen
- Alma mater: Fuller Theological Seminary (PhD)

Academic work
- Discipline: Biblical studies
- Sub-discipline: NT studies
- Institutions: Whitworth University
- Notable works: The Hebrew Gospel and the Development of the Synoptic Tradition (2009)

James R. Edwards (born 1945) is an American theologian and New Testament scholar. His primary research interests include Biblical studies and the history of the early church, with secondary interests in the Reformation and history of the twentieth-century German Church struggle. After earning degrees from Whitworth University, Princeton Theological Seminary, and Fuller Theological Seminary, and pursuing additional study at the University of Zürich and the University of Tübingen, Edwards taught at Jamestown College for nearly 20 years. He joined Whitworth's faculty in 1997, later holding the Bruner-Welch Endowed Chair of Theology. He continues to serve as professor emeritus of theology.

== The Hebrew Gospel and the Development of the Synoptic Tradition ==
In 2009, Edwards advanced a controversial theory that the synoptic Gospels are partly dependent on the "Hebrew Gospel", which includes the Gospel of the Hebrews, a syncretistic Jewish–Christian text believed by most scholars to have been composed in Koine Greek, the Hebrew Gospel hypothesis of Lessing and others, and traditions of a writing of Matthew's supposed to have been written by him “in the Hebrew language” (Papias) and Hebrew Gospel of Matthew, 1385, a rabbinical translation of Matthew's gospel. Edwards argues that patristic citations from "the Hebrew Gospel" correlate more distinctly and repeatedly with sections called "Special Luke" in the Gospel of Luke than with either the Gospel of Matthew or the Gospel of Mark.

Two separate reviews were published by the Society of Biblical Literature in which the reviewers were not convinced of Edwards' thesis. John S. Kloppenborg also reviewed Edwards' thesis negatively.

Edwards also rejects the modern division, by Schneemelcher and others, of the Jewish-Christian Gospels' fragments into three or more separate lost Gospels.

== Works ==
=== Commentaries ===
- Edwards, James R. (1992). Romans. NIBC. Vol. 6. Peabody, MA: Hendrickson. ISBN 978-0-943-57534-6. OCLC 24546901.
- ——— (2001). The Gospel According to Mark. PNTC. Grand Rapids, MI: Eerdmans. ISBN 978-0-8028-3734-9.
- ——— (2003). Romans. New Interpreter's Study Bible. Abingdon.
- ——— (2005). Hebrews. Renovare Study Bible. Harper.
- ——— (2015). The Gospel According to Luke. PNTC. Grand Rapids, MI: Eerdmans. ISBN 978-0-8028-3735-6.
- ——— (2012). Romans. Understanding the Bible (Reissue of the 1992 Hendrickson title ed.). Grand Rapids, MI: Baker Books. ISBN 978-0801046155.

=== Other books ===
- ———; Knight, George W., eds. (1987). The Layman's Overview of the Bible. Nashville, TN: Thomas Nelson Publishers. ISBN 978-0-840-77560-3. OCLC 15164774.
- ——— (1989). A response to A theological understanding of the relationship between Christians and Jews. Colorado Springs, CO: First Presbyterian Church. ISBN 9780802862341. OCLC 892924623.
- ——— (2000). The Divine Intruder. Colorado Springs, CO: NavPress. ISBN 978-1-576-83201-1. OCLC 43296776.
- ———; Knight, George W., eds. (2004). Compact Bible Handbook. Nelson's Compact Series. Nashville, TN: Thomas Nelson Publishers. ISBN 978-0-785-25246-7. OCLC 276406036.
- ——— (2005). Is Jesus the Only Savior?. Grand Rapids, MI: Eerdmans. ISBN 978-0-802-80981-0. OCLC 57531370.
- ——— (2009). The Hebrew Gospel and the Development of the Synoptic Tradition. Grand Rapids, MI: Eerdmans. ISBN 978-0-802-86234-1. OCLC 368048433.
- ——— (2019). Between the Swastika and the Sickle: The Life, Disappearance, and Execution of Ernst Lohmeyer. Grand Rapids, MI: Eerdmans. ISBN 978-0802876188.
- ——— (2021). From Christ to Christianity: How the Jesus Movement Became the Church in Less than a Generation. Grand Rapids, MI: Baker Academic. ISBN 978-1540961686.
- ——— (2026). In the Beginning. Grand Rapids, MI: Eerdmans. ISBN 978-0802879394.

=== Articles ===
- ——— (1994). "The Authority of Jesus in The Gospel of Mark". Journal of the Evangelical Theological Society. 37 (2): 217–233.
- ——— (Autumn 2004). "The Servant of the Lord and the Gospel of Mark". Southern Baptist Journal of Theology. 8 (3): 36–49.
- ——— (2011). "Galatians 5:12: circumcision, the Mother Goddess, and the scandal of the cross". Novum Testamentum. 53 (4): 319–337. doi:10.1163/156853611X578275.
