= Vaganay =

Vaganay is a French family name from the Saint-Étienne, Lyon, Vernaison region:

- Léon Vaganay (Saint-Étienne, 1882 - Vernaison, 1969) French biblical scholar at the University of Lyon
- de:Hugues Vaganay (Saint-Étienne 1870 - Lyon, 1936) French scholar of Ronsard
