= Gospel of Cerinthus =

Lost text used by Carpocrates

The Gospel of Cerinthus is a lost gospel used by Cerinthus and by Carpocrates. According to Epiphanius, this is a Jewish Gospel or Gnostic Gospel identical to the Gospel of the Ebionites and, apparently, is a truncated version of the Gospel of Matthew. Bardy calls it a "Judaizing" rather than Gnostic gospel.

== See also ==
- List of Gospels
