= Hebrew Gospel hypothesis =

Group of theories relating to early Christian history

- Proto-Gospel hypothesis, Aramaic Matthew hypothesis

Theory Information
- Order: Ur-Gospel; Matt, Mark, Luke
- Additional Sources: Ur-Gospel

Gospels' Sources
- Matthew: Ur-Gospel
- Mark: Ur-Gospel
- Luke: Ur-Gospel

Theory History
- Originator: Jerome
- Proponents: Johann Gottfried Eichhorn Wilhelm Schneemelcher

In the 18th and early 19th century, several scholars suggested that a Hebrew proto-gospel (a so-called Ur-Gospel) was the main source or one of several sources for the canonical gospels. This theorizing would later give birth to the two source-hypothesis that views Q as a proto-gospel but believes this proto-gospel to have been written in Koine Greek. After the widespread scholarly acceptance of the two-source hypothesis, scholarly interest in the Hebrew gospel hypothesis dwindled. Modern variants of the Hebrew gospel hypothesis survive, but have not found favor with scholars as a whole.

The foundation of the Hebrew gospel hypothesis is usually an early Christian tradition from the 2nd-century bishop Papias of Hierapolis. According to Papias, Matthew the Apostle was the first to compose a gospel, and he did so in Hebrew. Papias appeared to imply that this Hebrew or Aramaic gospel (sometimes called the Authentic Matthew) was subsequently translated into the canonical Gospel of Matthew. Jerome took this information one step further and claimed that all known Jewish-Christian gospels really were one and the same, and that this gospel was the authentic Matthew. As a consequence he assigned all known quotations from Jewish-Christian gospels to the "gospels of the Hebrews", but modern studies have shown this to be untenable.

The hypothesis has some overlap with the Aramaic original New Testament theory, which posits Gospels originally written in Aramaic rather than Hebrew. Modern versions of the Hebrew gospel hypothesis often overlap with the Augustinian hypothesis.

== Basis of the Hebrew gospel hypothesis: Papias and the early church fathers ==
The idea that Matthew wrote a gospel in a language other than Greek begins with Papias of Hierapolis, c. 125–150 AD. In a passage with several ambiguous phrases, he wrote: "Matthew collected the oracles (logia – sayings of or about Jesus) in the Hebrew language (Hebraïdi dialektōi — perhaps alternatively "Hebrew style") and each one interpreted (hērmēneusen — or "translated") them as best he could." Some have claimed that by "Hebrew" Papias would have meant Aramaic, the common language of the Middle East besides Koine Greek. A 2014 survey of contemporary texts asserts that "Hebraïdi" meant Hebrew and never Aramaic. Nevertheless, Matthew's Greek "reveals none of the telltale marks of a translation." Blomberg writes that "Jewish authors like Josephus, writing in Greek while at times translating Hebrew materials, often leave no linguistic clues to betray their Semitic sources".

Most scholars do not believe that Matthew is a translation and several theories have been put forward to explain Papias: One theory is that Matthew himself produced firstly a Semitic work and secondly a recension of that work in Greek; Josephus also claimed to write a translation of an Aramaic version of The Jewish War, though both the extant Gospel of Matthew and the War are not translations. Another possibility forwarded by Maurice Casey is that Papias refers to a distinct work now lost, perhaps a sayings collection like Q or the so-called Gospel according to the Hebrews. A third is that by dialektōi Papias may have meant that Matthew wrote in the Jewish style rather than in the Hebrew language.

Nevertheless, on the basis of Papias and other information Jerome (c. 327–420) claimed that all the Jewish Christian communities shared a single gospel (the so-called Gospel of the Hebrews), that was practically identical with the Hebrew or Aramaic Matthew; he also claimed to have personally found this gospel in use among some communities in Syria.

Jerome's testimony is regarded with skepticism by modern scholars. Jerome claims to have seen a gospel in Aramaic that contained all the quotations he assigns to it, but it can be demonstrated that some of them could never have existed in a Semitic language. His claim to have produced all the translations himself is also suspect, as many are found in earlier scholars such as Origen and Eusebius. Jerome appears to have assigned these quotations to the Gospel of the Hebrews, but it appears more likely that there were at least two and probably three ancient Jewish-Christian gospels, and only one of them in a Semitic language.

=== Relevant Quotations by Church Fathers ===
Mark having become the interpreter of Peter, wrote down accurately whatsoever he remembered. It was not, however, in exact order that he related the sayings or deeds of Christ. For he neither heard the Lord nor accompanied Him. But afterwards, as I said, he accompanied Peter, who accommodated his instructions to the necessities [of his hearers], but with no intention of giving a regular narrative of the Lord's sayings. Wherefore Mark made no mistake in thus writing some things as he remembered them. For of one thing he took especial care, not to omit anything he had heard, and not to put anything fictitious into the statements. [This is what is related by Papias regarding Mark; but with regard to Matthew he has made the following statements:] Matthew put together the oracles [of the Lord] in the Hebrew language, and each one interpreted them as best he could. [The same person uses proofs from the First Epistle of John, and from the Epistle of Peter in like manner. And he also gives another story of a woman who was accused of many sins before the Lord, which is to be found in the Gospel according to the Hebrews.]

— Papias circa 120 AD, quoted by Eusebius, Church History

Matthew, who is also Levi, and who from a publican came to be an apostle, first of all composed a Gospel of Christ in Judaea in the Hebrew language and characters for the benefit of those of the circumcision who had believed. Who translated it after that in Greek is not sufficiently ascertained. Moreover, the Hebrew itself is preserved to this day in the library at Caesarea, which the martyr Pamphilus so diligently collected. I also was allowed by the Nazarenes who use this volume in the Syrian city of Beroea to copy it.

— Jerome: De viris illustribus (On Illustrious Men), chapter III.

He (Shaul) being a Hebrew wrote in Hebrew, that is, his own tongue and most fluently; while things which were eloquently written in Hebrew were more eloquently turned into Greek.

— Jerome, 382 AD, On Illustrious Men, Book V

Matthew also issued a written gospel among the Hebrews in their own dialect.

— Irenaeus, Against Heresies 3:1 [c.175-185 A.D.]

First to be written was by Matthew, who was once a tax collector but later an apostle of Jesus Christ, who published it in Hebrew for Jewish believers.

— Origen circa 210 AD, quoted by Eusebius, Church History, Book 6, Chapter 25, Section 4

== The Hebrew gospel hypothesis and modern criticism ==
=== Composition of Matthew: modern consensus ===
Matthew's gospel probably originated in a Jewish-Christian community in Roman Syria towards the end of the first century AD, and there is little doubt among modern scholars that it was composed in Koine Greek, the daily language of the time. The widespread Two-source hypothesis posits the Gospel of Mark; the hypothetical Q source; and material unique to his own community, called M, as major sources, though Q's existence has been increasingly questioned by alternative theories such as Farrer and Matthean Posteriority. Mark and Q were both written sources composed in Greek, but some of the parts of Q may have been translated from Aramaic into Greek more than once. M is comparatively small, only 170 verses, and made up almost exclusively of teachings; it probably was not a single source, and while some of it may have been written, most seems to have been oral.

=== 19th century ===
An early modern advocate of the proto-gospel hypothesis was Eichhorn who suggested the existence of an Ur-Gospel in 1794–1804, but this theory won little support in the following years. General sources such as John Kitto's Cyclopedia describe the hypothesis but note that it had been rejected by almost all succeeding critics.

Johann Gottfried von Herder in turn argued for an oral Gospel tradition as an unwritten proto-gospel, leading to Friedrich Schleiermacher's idea of the gospel Papias referred to as being a separate work from canonical Matthew composed only of sayings of Jesus and no narrative, later known as the Q source. This logia would have been the a source for the canonical gospels.

In 1838, Christian Hermann Weisse took Schleiermacher's suggestion of a sayings source (Q) and combined it with the idea of Marcan priority to formulate what is now called the Two-source hypothesis. As the shared passages in Matthew and Luke presumably from Q matched exactly, it was presumed that Q too must have been in Greek, rather than a translation from Hebrew or Aramaic which would likely have resulted in subtly different phrasings.

=== 20th century ===
Acceptance of a proto-Gospel hypothesis in any form was in the 20th century minimal. Critical scholars had long moved on from the hypotheses of Eichhorn, Schleiermacher (1832) and K. Lachmann (1835). Traditional Lutheran commentator Richard Lenski (1943) wrote regarding the "hypothesis of an original Hebrew Matthew" that "whatever Matthew wrote in Hebrew was so ephemeral that it disappeared completely at a date so early that even the earliest fathers never obtained sight of the writing".

Regarding the related question of the reliability of Jerome's testimony also saw few scholars taking his evidence at face value. Helmut Köster (2000) casts doubt upon the value of Jerome's evidence for linguistic reasons; "Jerome's claim that he himself saw a gospel in Aramaic that contained all the fragments that he assigned to it is not credible, nor is it believable that he translated the respective passages from Aramaic into Greek (and Latin), as he claims several times."

One advocate for the existence of a Hebrew gospel was Wilhelm Schneemelcher who cited several early fathers, apart from Jerome, as witnesses to the existence of a Hebrew gospel similar to Matthew – including Clement of Alexandria, Origen, Eusebius and Hegesippus.

In the 20th century, three French scholars have suggested that Matthew as well as Mark was originally written in Hebrew, although they are an extreme minority. Jean Carmignac studied the Dead Sea Scrolls and found that translating Mark from Greek to Hebrew was surprisingly easy. He wrote the 1987 book The Birth of the Synoptics defending the idea of a Hebrew Mark/Matthew. Likewise, Claude Tresmontant hypothesized Hebrew originals for all four Gospels in his book The Hebrew Christ (1989). Jean-Marie Van Cangh has supported Carmignac's hypothesis since and authored in 2005 a Hebrew retroversion of the Gospel according to Mark under the title L'Evangile de Marc : un original hébreu ?

== The hypothesis in relation to the synoptic problem ==
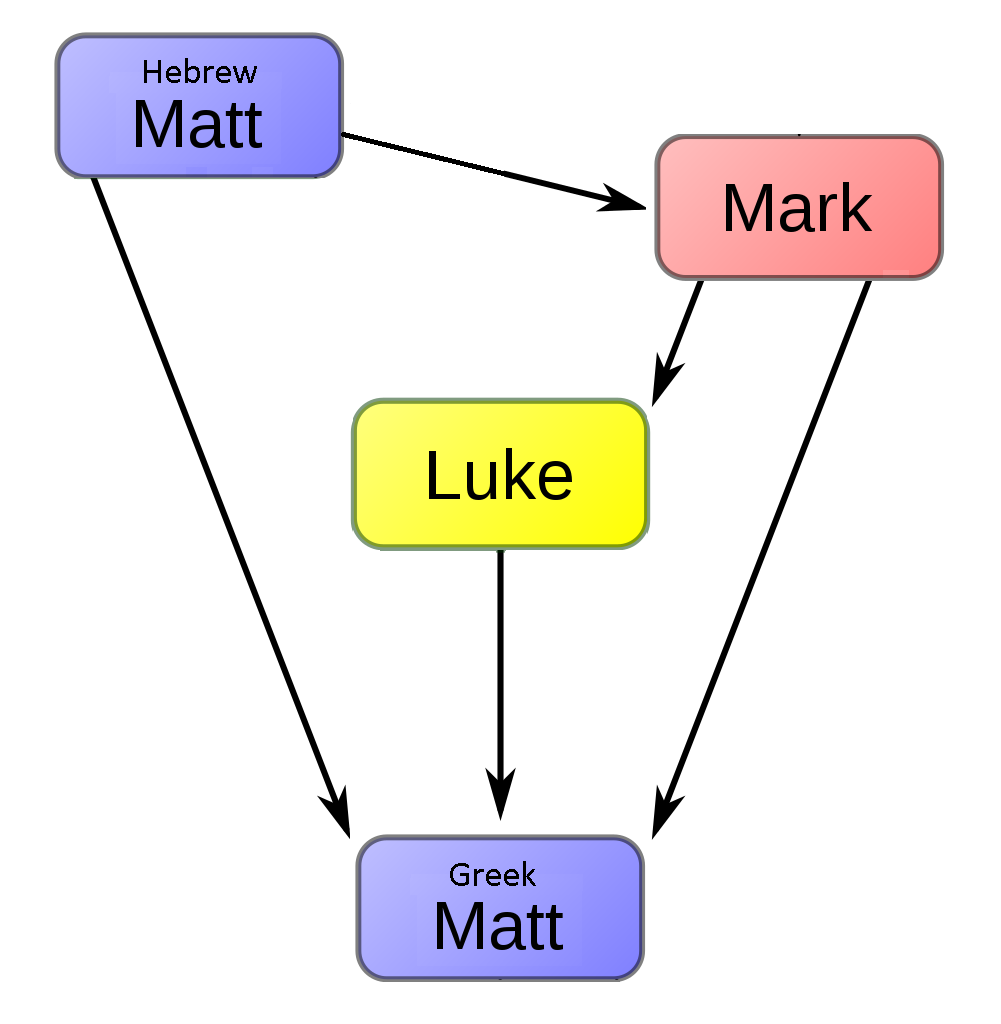
The Hebrew Gospel hypothesis of professor Theodor Zahn posits that Mark drew from proto-Matthew in Hebrew; Luke used Mark and oral tradition; and Greek Matthew was based on proto-Matthew, Mark, and Luke.

The synoptic gospels are the three gospels of Mark, Matthew and Luke: they share much the same material in much the same order, and are clearly related. The precise nature of the relationship is the synoptic problem. The most widely held solution to the problem today is the two-source theory, which holds that Mark, plus another, hypothetical source, Q, were used by Matthew and Luke. But while this theory has widespread support, there is a notable minority view that Mark was written last using Matthew and Luke (the two-gospel hypothesis). Still other scholars accept Markan priority, but argue that Q never existed, and that Luke used Matthew as a source as well as Mark (the Farrer hypothesis).

A further, and very minority, theory is that there was a gospel written in Hebrew or Aramaic that was used as a source by one or all of the other synoptics gospel – most often suggested a Hebrew or Aramaic proto-Matthew. Today, this hypothesis is held to be discredited by most experts. As outlined subsequently, this was always a minority view, but in former times occasionally rather influential, and advanced by some eminent scholars. The hypothesis has overlaps with the Augustinian hypothesis and the idea of Aramaic primacy.

=== Early modern period ===
Richard Simon of Normandy in 1689 asserted that an Aramaic or Hebrew Gospel of Matthew, lay behind the Nazarene Gospel, and was the Proto-Gospel. J. J. Griesbach treated this as the first of three source theories as solutions to the synoptic problem, following (1) the traditional Augustinian utilization hypothesis, as (2) the original gospel hypothesis or proto-gospel hypothesis, (3) the fragment hypothesis (Koppe); and (4) the oral gospel hypothesis or tradition hypothesis (Herder 1797).

=== 18th century: Lessing, Olshausen, Eichhorn ===
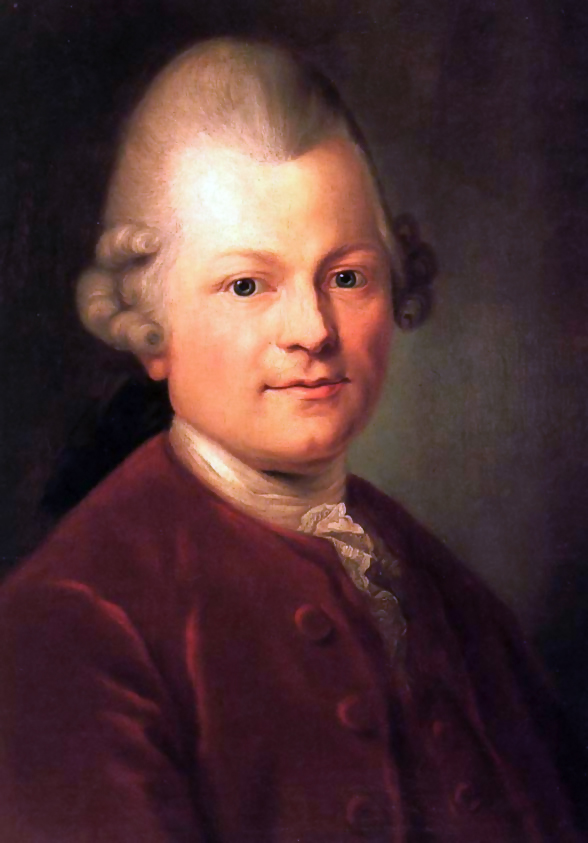
Gotthold Ephraim Lessing whose New hypothesis on the Evangelists, 1778 suggested a lost Hebrew Gospel as a free source for the Synoptic Gospels

In 1778, Gotthold Ephraim Lessing posited several lost Aramaic Gospels as Ur-Gospel or proto-Gospel as common sources used freely for the three Greek Synoptic Gospels. He was followed by Johann Gottfried Eichhorn, who in 1804 provided a comprehensive basis for the proto-gospel hypothesis and argued for an Aramaic original gospel that each of the Synoptic evangelists had in a different intermediate form.

Hermann Olshausen (1832) suggested a lost Hebrew Matthew was the common source of Greek Matthew and the Jewish-Christian Gospels mentioned by Epiphanius, Jerome and others.

=== 19th century: Nicholson, Handmann ===
Edward Nicholson (1879) proposed that Matthew wrote two Gospels, the first in Greek, the second in Hebrew. The International Standard Bible Encyclopedia (1915) in its article Gospel of the Hebrews noted that Nicholson cannot be said...[to] have carried conviction to the minds of New Testament scholars."

Rudolf Handmann (1888) proposed an Aramaic Gospel of the Hebrews but reasoned that this was not the Hebrew Matthew and there never was a Hebrew Ur-Matthew.

=== 20th century: Zahn, Belser ===
During the 20th century Léon Vaganay (1940), Lucien Cerfaux, Xavier Léon-Dufour and Antonio Gaboury (1952) attempted to revive Lessing's proto-gospel hypothesis.

Related is the "Aramaic Matthew hypothesis" of Theodor Zahn, which propounded the existence of an early lost Aramaic version of Matthew. In Zahn's opinion, Matthew wrote a complete Gospel in Aramaic; Mark was familiar with this document, which he used while abridging it. Matthew's Greek translator utilized Mark, but only for form, whereas Luke depended upon Mark and secondary sources, but was not acquainted with "Aramaic Matthew". Setting him apart from some earlier scholars, Zahn did not believe Hebrew Matthew was identical to the surviving fragments of the Jewish-Christian gospels; instead, he understood them as derivative works.

J. E. Belser held a similar view to Zahn and suggested that Matthew first wrote his Gospel in Hebrew, a Greek translation of it being made in 59–60, and Mark depended on Matthew's Aramaic document and Peter's preaching in Rome. Luke made use of Mark, of Matthew (both in Aramaic and Greek), and also of oral tradition.

=== 21st century Edwards, Casey ===
James R. Edwards, in The Hebrew Gospel and the development of the synoptic tradition (2009), suggested that a lost Hebrew Ur-Matthew is the common source of both the Jewish-Christian Gospels and the unique L source material (material not sourced from Mark or Q) in the Gospel of Luke. Edwards suggestion is in effect that a proto-Luke (rather than a proto-Matthew) is the lost Hebrew proto-gospel. His thesis has not been accepted by other scholars.

Maurice Casey argues in Jesus: Evidence and Argument or Mythicist Myths? (2014) that Matthew did compose a sayings collection in Aramaic (a proto-Matthew) that is the source for both the Greek canonical Matthew and Luke. Casey suggests that this is what Papias meant when he said that "each (person) translated/interpreted them as he was able" and that later Church fathers confused proto-Matthew with the Greek Gospel of Matthew. Casey also argues that the Greek Gospel of Matthew is a composite work (that also made use of Mark) that was, in accordance with common custom at the time, attributed "to the fountainheads of tradition" i.e. Matthew.

== Bibliography ==
- Aland, Kurt; Aland, Barbara (1995), The Text of the New Testament: An Introduction to the Critical Editions and to the Theory and Practice of Modern Textual Criticism, Wm B Eerdmans, ISBN 9780802840981.
- Blomberg, Craig A, ed. (1992), Matthew, Broadman.
- Bromiley, Geoffrey W, ed. (1979), International Standard Bible Encyclopedia: A–D, Wm B Eerdmans, ISBN 9780802837851.
- Burkett, Delbert (2002), An introduction to the New Testament and the origins of Christianity, Cambridge University Press, ISBN 978-0-521-00720-7.
- Cameron, Ron (1982), The Other Gospels: Non-Canonical Gospel Texts, Westminster John Knox, ISBN 9780664244286.
- Duling, Dennis C (2010), "The Gospel of Matthew", in Aune, David E (ed.), Blackwell companion to the New Testament, Wiley-Blackwell, ISBN 9781444318944.
- Ehrman, Bart D (2003), Lost Scriptures, OUP, ISBN 9780199743681.
- ———; Plese, Zlatko (2011), The Apocryphal Gospels: Texts and Translations, OUP, ISBN 9780199831289
- Garza, Al (2020), The Hebrew New Testament; Evidence And Issues, Sefer Press Publishing, ISBN 978-1716048920
- Harrington, Daniel J. (1991), The Gospel of Matthew, Liturgical Press, ISBN 9780814658031.
- Koester, Helmut (1990). Ancient Christian Gospels: Their History and Development. Trinity Press. p. 349. ISBN 978-0-334-02459-0.
- Köster, Helmut (2000) [1982], Introduction to the New Testament: History and Literature of Early Christianity (2 ed.), Walter de Gruyter, ISBN 978-3-11-014692-9.
- Lapham, Fred (2003). An Introduction to the New Testament Apocrypha. Continuum International Publishing Group. ISBN 978-0-8264-6979-3.
- Nellen, Henk JM; Rabbie, Edwin (1994), Hugo Grotius, Theologian: Essays in Honour of Guillaume Henri Marie Posthumus Meyjes, Brill.
- Powers, B Ward (2010), The Progressive Publication of Matthew, B&H Publishing Group.
- Reicke, Bo (2005), "Griesbach's Answer to the Synoptic Question", in Orchard, Bernard; Longstaff, Thomas RW (eds.), J. J. Griesbach: Synoptic and Text – Critical Studies 1776–1976, Cambridge University Press, ISBN 9780521020558.
- Turner, David L (2008), Matthew, Baker, ISBN 9780801026843.
- Van Voorst, Robert E (2000), Jesus Outside the New Testament: An Introduction to the Ancient Evidence, Wm B Eerdmans, ISBN 9780802843685
- Witherington, Ben (2001), The Gospel of Mark: A Socio-Rhetorical Commentary, Wm B Eerdmans, ISBN 9780802845030.
