= Tjitze Baarda =

Dutch theologian (born 1932)

- Born: 8 July 1932; Vogelenzang, Netherlands
- Died: 23 August 2017 (aged 85); Amstelveen, Netherlands

Academic background
- Education: Vrije Universiteit Amsterdam
- Thesis: The Gospel Quotations of Aphrahat the Persian Sage (1975)
- Doctoral advisor: Matthew Black and R. Schippers

Academic work
- Discipline: New Testament theology
- Institutions: Vrije Universiteit Amsterdam; Utrecht University

Tjitze Baarda (8 July 1932 – 23 August 2017) was a Dutch professor of theology. He spent his career at the Vrije Universiteit Amsterdam (VU) and Utrecht University. He specialized in the four gospels of the New Testament.

== Career ==
Baarda was born on 8 July 1932 in Vogelenzang. He studied theology and Semitic languages at the VU. He obtained his doctorate in 1975 with a dissertation entitled The Gospel Quotations of Aphrahat the Persian Sage. His doctoral advisors were Matthew Black and R. Schippers. Baarda subsequently became a professor of Biblical criticism, exegesis and canon of the New Testament at the same university.

In 1981 Baarda became extraordinary professor (Dutch: buitengewoon hoogleraar) at Utrecht University, two years later he became a regular professor. During his time in Utrecht he held the chair of Antique Judaism and explanation of the New Testament. In 1990 he returned to the VU and held the chair of New Testament. He retired in 1997. During his career he specialized in the four gospels of the New Testament.

Baarda became a member of the Royal Netherlands Academy of Arts and Sciences in 1982.

Baarda died in Amstelveen on 23 August 2017.
