= Bernhard Pick =

German historian (1842–1917)

Bernhard Pick (Kempen 19 December 1842 – 1917) was a German-American Lutheran pastor and scholar.

He studied at Union Theological Seminary in New York City and after became a pastor. As a scholar he contributed many articles to the Schaff-Herzog Encyclopaedia of Religious Knowledge and McClintock and James Strong's Cyclopaedia of Biblical, Theological, and Ecclesiastical Literature. He also provided the index to Johann Peter Lange's Commentary on the Old Testament 1882 and an "Index to the Ante-Nicene Fathers" (1887). Pick's interest in hymnology led to Luther as a Hymnist Philadelphia, 1875 and an edition of Luther's "Ein feste Burg" in 19 Languages 1880; enlarged in 21 languages, Chicago, 1883.

== Works ==
Many of Pick's works are now being reissued with 21st-century publication dates:

- Judisches Volksleben zur Zeit Jesus Rochester, New York, 1880
- A Historical Sketch of the Jews since the Destruction of Jerusalem 1887
- The Life of Christ according to Extra-Canonical Sources 1887
- The Talmud: what it is and what it says about Jesus and the Christians 1887
- "Historical Sketch of the Jews Since Their Return from Babylon". With Illustrations of Jewish Customs and Life. The Open Court (Chicago), 1897: Part 1, XI (5), May 1897: 265-279 https://opensiuc.lib.siu.edu/ocj/vol1897/iss5/2.—Part 2 (Concluded), XI (6), June 1897: 337-364 https://opensiuc.lib.siu.edu/ocj/vol1897/iss6/3.
- Paralipomena - Remains of Gospels and Sayings of Christ 1908 - including a chapter The Gospel to the Hebrews
- The Cabala: Its Influence on Judaism and Christianity 1913
- The Apocryphal Acts of Paul, Peter, John, Andrew and Thomas. The Open Court Publishing Co., Kegan Paul, Trench, Trübner & Co., Ltd, Chicago, London 1909.
- "The Devotional Songs of Novalis German and English Collected and Edited by - Published The Open court Publishing Company London Agents Kegan Paul, rench, Trubner & Co 1910"

He also translated Franz Delitzsch Jewish Artisan Life in the Time of Jesus 1883
