= Oskar Skarsaune =

Norwegian scholar of church history (b. 1946)

Oskar Skarsaune (born 2 July 1946, in Trondheim) is professor emeritus of church history at MF Norwegian School of Theology in Oslo.

Skarsaune's major work on Justin Martyr, The Proof from Prophecy. A Study in Justin Martyr's Proof-Text Tradition: Text-Type, Provenance, Theological Profile is frequently cited. His study calls for a revision in views of accounts of Justin's conversion.

Skarsaune is also editor of and contributor to The History of Jewish Believers in Jesus from Antiquity to the Present, which includes his study of the Ebionites – whom Skarsaune argued made a central claim of the parentage of Joseph, and against the virgin birth of Jesus. Skarsaune has close ties to the Messianic Jewish community in Israel and invited their contribution to the project.
