= Albertus Klijn =

Dutch religious scholar (1923–2012)

A. F. J. Klijn
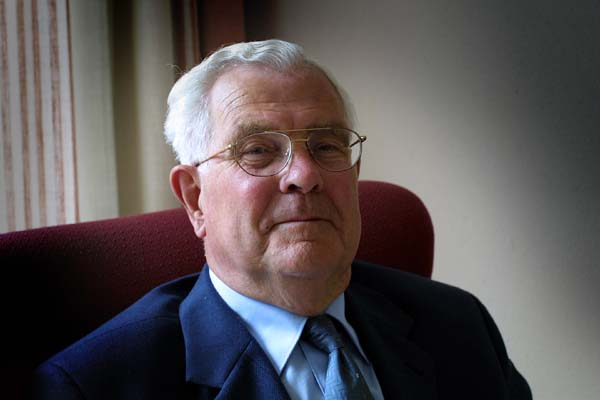
- A. F. J. Klijn
- Born: 17 April 1923 (age 103); Doorn, Netherlands
- Died: 30 May 2012 (aged 89); Haren, Groningen

Academic background
- Education: Utrecht University
- Thesis: "Western" Text of the Gospels and Acts (1949)

Academic work
- Discipline: New Testament scholar Early Christianity
- School or tradition: Reformed
- Institutions: Rijksuniversiteit Groningen
- Main interests: New Testament; Early Christianity

Albertus Frederik Johannes Klijn (17 April 1923 – 30 May 2012) was a Dutch scholar of the New Testament and early Judaism and Christianity at the Rijksuniversiteit Groningen. He was best known for his introductory work on the New Testament, and then later for his publications on early Christian apocryphal literature.

Klijn was born in Doorn in Utrecht.

Klijn studied theology at Rijksuniversiteit Utrecht, and submitted his doctoral dissertation in 1949 on the "Western" Text of the Gospels and Acts. In 1951 he became a Reformed pastor in Heinkenszand, Zeeland. Four years later he began teaching, returning to the University of Utrecht as a lecturer. In 1967 Klijn was appointed professor of early Christian literature and interpretation of the New Testament at the Rijksuniversiteit Groningen. It was at Groningen that he began to specialize in second-temple Jewish pseudepigrapha and in early Christian literature. Klijn was the editor of the series "De prediking van het Nieuwe Testament: Een theologische commentaar", to which he himself contributed volumes on the Pastoral Epistles (1994), the Epistle to the Hebrews (1975) and the Epistle to the Philippians (1974). Klijn retired from Groningen in 1986.

== Select works ==
=== Thesis ===
- Klijn, Albertus F. J. (1949). A Survey of the Researches into the Western Text of the Gospels and Acts (Ph.D.). Utrecht: Utrecht University. OCLC 4278387.

=== Books ===
- Klijn, Albertus F. J. (1965). Edessa, de stad van de apostel Thomas: Het oudste Christendom in Syrië. Neukirchener Studienbücher. Vol. 4. Neukirchen-Vluyn: Neukirchener Verlag des Erziehung svereins. OCLC 5255941.
- ——— (1969). A Survey of the Researches into the Western Text of the Gospels and Acts; part 2: 1949-1969. Supplements to Novum Testamentum. Vol. 21. Leiden: Brill. ISBN 9789004016019. OCLC 130026.
- ———; Reinink, G. J. (1973). Patristic Evidence for Jewish-Christian Sects. Leiden.
- ——— (1973). Na het Nieuwe Testament; de christelijke literatuur uit de tweede eeuw. ISBN 9025940366. Baarn: Ten Have.
- ——— (1974). De wordingsgeschiedenis van het Nieuwe Testament (4th updated ed.). Utrecht.
- ——— (1977). Seth in Jewish, Christian and Gnostic Literature. Leiden.
- ——— (1980). An Introduction to the New Testament. Leiden. - English translation of De wordingsgeschiedenis van het Nieuwe Testament
- ——— (1983). Der lateinische Text der Apokalypse des Esra. Texte und Untersuchungen zur Geschichte der altchristlichen Literatur. Vol. 131. Berlin: Akademie-Verlag. OCLC 10538911.
- ——— (1981). Apostolische vaders: Vertaald, ingeleid en toegelicht. Vol. 1. Kampen.
- ——— (1983). Apostolische vaders: Vertaald, ingeleid en toegelicht. Vol. 2. Kampen.
- ———; Leemhuis, F.; van Gelder, G. J. H. (1986). The Arabic Text of the Apocalypse of Baruch: Edited and Translated with a Parallel Translation of the Syriac Text. Leiden.
- ——— (1992). Jewish-Christian Gospel Tradition. Leiden. ISBN 978-90-04-09453-6.
- ——— (1992). Die Esra-Apokalypse (IV. Esra), nach dem lateinischen Text unter Benutzung der anderen Versionen. Berlin.
- ——— (1995). Het ontstaan van een nieuw testament. Baarn.
- ——— (2003). The Acts of Thomas: Introduction, Text, and Commentary. Supplements to Novum Testamentum. Vol. 108 (2nd revised ed.). Leiden & Boston: Brill. ISBN 9781417505975. OCLC 55505373.
- ——— (2006). De apocriefen van het Nieuwe Testament: Buitenbijbelse evangeliën, handelingen, brieven en openbaringen. Kampen.

=== Articles & Chapters ===
- ——— (1959). "A Survey of the Researches into the Western Text of the Gospels and Acts (1949-1959)". Novum Testamentum. 3 (1): 1–27. doi:10.1163/156853659X00110.
- ——— (1959). "A Survey of the Researches into the Western Text of the Gospels and Acts (1949-1959)". Novum Testamentum. 3 (2): 161–73.

== Festschriften ==
- Tjitze Baarda (ed.), Text and Testimony: Essays on New Testament and Apocryphal Literature in Honour of A. F. J. Klijn (Kampen 1988)
