= Léon Vaganay =

Léon Vaganay (Saint-Étienne, 22 October 1882 - Vernaison, 30 March 1969) was a French Roman Catholic priest and biblical scholar.

Vaganay was among the minority of modern scholars who considered the original text of the New Testament was closer to the Western text than to the Alexandrian text type. His views on the Gospel of Peter also diverged from previous scholarship, with Vaganay disputing docetic origins.
