= Ron Cameron (biblical scholar) =

American biblical scholar

Ron Cameron (born 1951) is an American biblical scholar. He is currently a professor of religion at Wesleyan University. He is an editor of the SBL Seminar on Ancient Myths and Modern Theories of Christian Origins, a series which reassesses the agenda of modern scholarship on Christian origins.

He graduated from Western Kentucky University (BA) and Harvard Divinity School (MTS, PhD).

== Published works ==
- Redescribing Christian Origins Ron Cameron, Merrill P. Miller - 2004
- Redescribing Paul and the Corinthians Ron Cameron, Merrill P. Miller - 2011
- The Other Gospels: Non-Canonical Gospel Texts Ron Cameron - 2001 - Sixteen texts constituting what remains of the non-canonical gospels from the first and second centuries. Some of these apocryphal gospels are from the Nag Hammadi library, made available only recently.
- editor of The Apocryphal Jesus and Christian Origins (Semeia 49).
