= Philipp Vielhauer =

German Lutheran pastor and scholar

Philipp Adam Christoph Vielhauer (Bali, Cameroon 3 December 1914- Bonn 23 December 1977) was a German Lutheran pastor, and scholar of early Christianity and the New Testament Apocrypha. He is notable for having been the first German scholar to recognise quotes of Pauline epistles in the Book of Acts.

Philipp Vielhauer was born in Cameroon to Rev. (later Dr.) Gustav Adolf and April Vielhauer, a missionary couple of the Basel Mission. Adolf Vielhauer had already been resident in Cameroon for 20 years. His mother died in Cameroon in 1925.

He was ordained by his father on 11 June 1936 in the Lutherhaus at Karlsruhe-Durlach. As someone who had already participated in the Bekennende Kirche movement at University, as a pastor he refused to sign a document supporting the Nazi regime in 1937 and lost his stipend at Baden. Though he found a position at the Lutheran church in Stuttgart-Untertürkheim from 1935-1941. He was drafted in 1941 and severely wounded in Toropets, Russia in 1944.

Vielhauer taught briefly at University of Göttingen 1947-1949, then at the University of Bonn from 1950 till his death in 1977

== Publications ==
- Aufsätze zum Neuen Testament, München, Chr. Kaiser Verlag, Vol. 1 (1965), Vol. 2 (1979).
- Zum "Paulinismus" der Apostelgeschichte, 1950, English translation: On the Paulinism of Acts, in Leander E. Keck, J. Louis Martyn (eds.), Studies in Luke-Acts. Essays Presented in Honor of Paul Schubert, Nashville: Abingdon Press 1966, pp. 33–50 (this essay made the important point that the author of Acts knew at least some of the letters of Paul).
- Geschichte der urchristlichen Literatur: Einleitung in das Neue Testament, die Apokryphen und die Apostolischen Vater, Berlin: Walter de Gruyter, 1975.
- Jewish-Christian Gospels in Hennecke and Schneemelcher's New Testament Apocrypha, John Kxnox Press, 1991.
