= Wilhelm Schneemelcher =

Theologian and expert on the New Testament Apocrypha (1914-2003)

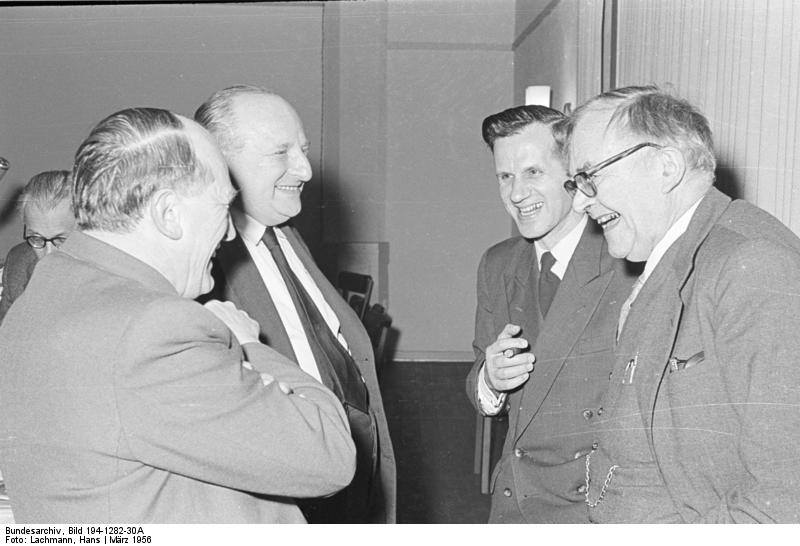
Schneemelcher (2nd from right) in Wuppertal in 1956

Wilhelm Schneemelcher (21 August 1914, Berlin – 6 August 2003, Bad Honnef) was a German Protestant theologian and expert on the New Testament Apocrypha.

== Career ==
He obtained through Hans Lietzmann a post researching Latin and Greek manuscripts at the Church Fathers Commission, however this came under the Prussian Academy of Sciences so in 1938 Schneemelcher was removed by the Nazi authorities due to being "politically unreliable", due to sympathies with the Confessing Church, and was forced to turn to making a living as a bookseller's assistant.

In 1939 he was conscripted into the Wehrmacht, and after the war he was a village pastor in Stöckheim near Northeim.

From 1954 to 1979 he was professor of patristics at the University of Bonn. He was editor of the collection Festschrift für Günther Dehn in honour of the anti-Nazi pastor Günther Dehn.

== Works ==
He completely revised and enlarged the older collection of Edgar Hennecke (1865–1951) to produce the Neutestamentlichen Apokryphen in deutscher Übersetzung in 1964, which was then translated into English as The New Testament Apocrypha by R. McL. Wilson in 1965. As editor he coordinated the work of dozens of scholars including Philip Vielhauer and Georg Streck. His work is today commonly referred to as the "standard edition" of the New Testament Apocrypha. In later years, Schneemelcher's co-editor was Joachim Jeremias.
