= Gospel of Thomas =

Extra-canonical sayings gospel

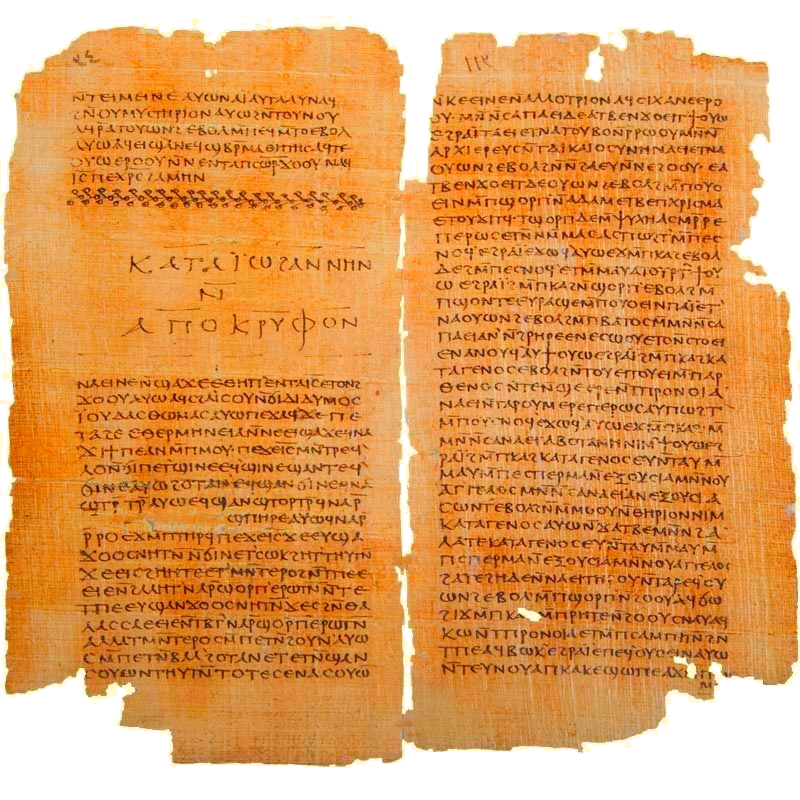
Nag Hammadi Codex II: The beginning of the Gospel of Thomas

The Gospel of Thomas (also known as the Coptic Gospel of Thomas) is a non-canonical sayings gospel. Unlike the canonical gospels, it is not a narrative account of Jesus' life but a collection of sayings (logia) attributed to Jesus, sometimes stand-alone, sometimes embedded in short dialogues or parables. The text contains a possible allusion to the death of Jesus in saying (logion) 65 (Parable of the Wicked Husbandmen), but does not mention his crucifixion, his resurrection, or the Last Judgment; nor does it mention a messianic understanding of Jesus. It is the only early Christian sayings collection known to survive in its original form. It is one of the best known and most studied of the New Testament apocrypha, and is often regarded as the most significant text of the Nag Hammadi library.

The Gospel of Thomas was discovered by farmers near Nag Hammadi, Egypt, in December 1945 among a group of books known as the Nag Hammadi library. Most scholars place the composition during the second century, while some have traced signs of origins to 60 AD. Most scholars agree Thomas depends on the synoptic gospels.

The only complete surviving text is written in the Coptic language and is a translation from Koine Greek. The text is the second of seven contained in what scholars have designated as Nag Hammadi Codex II. It comprises 114 sayings attributed to Jesus. Roughly half of these sayings have parallels in the synoptic gospels, and scriptural parallels or echoes have been proposed for more than 80% of them. Some scholars read other sayings as presupposing a Gnostic point of view. Its place of origin may have been Syria, where Thomasine traditions were strong. Other scholars have suggested an Alexandrian origin.

The introduction includes: "These are the hidden words that the living Jesus spoke and Didymos Judas Thomas wrote them down." However, scholars regard this attribution to the Apostle Thomas as pseudepigraphic, and the true author is unknown. Because it was found among the Nag Hammadi texts, most early interpreters understood it as some kind of Gnostic gospel. This view has since been challenged, with critics arguing that a Gnostic reading imports ideas the text itself does not contain; others, such as Bart Ehrman, argue that Gnostic perspectives are evident in the text and help explain some of its more difficult sayings.

== Contents ==
These are the hidden sayings that the living Jesus spoke and Judas Thomas the Twin recorded.

1. And he said, "Whoever discovers the interpretation of these sayings will not taste death."

2. Jesus said, "Let one who seeks not stop seeking until one finds. When one finds, one will be troubled. When one is troubled, one will marvel and will reign over all."

3. Jesus said, "If your leaders say to you, 'Look, the kingdom is in heaven,' then the birds of heaven will precede you. If they say to you, 'It is in the sea,' then the fish will precede you. Rather, the kingdom is inside you and it is outside you. When you know yourselves, then you will be known, and you will understand that you are children of the living Father. But if you do not know yourselves, then you dwell in poverty, and you are poverty."

— Prologue and sayings 1–3, translated by Marvin Meyer

The Gospel of Thomas consists of 114 sayings attributed to Jesus; the numbering, which derives from the 1959 publication, is a modern convention and does not appear in the manuscript. Most sayings are introduced simply by "Jesus said", some by a question or statement from the disciples, and only saying 13 is expanded into a longer exchange. They include wisdom sayings and proverbs, parables, prophetic sayings, and rules for the community. Apart from an introduction (sayings 1–2), a central section (49–61) and a conclusion (113–114), the sayings follow no overall plan, though small groups are sometimes possibly related by a shared form or catchword.

The prologue presents the collection as the "hidden sayings" of the "living Jesus", and the first saying promises that whoever finds their interpretation will not taste death. Readers are thus expected to work out the meaning of sayings that are often cryptic. Jesus appears purely as a teacher of wisdom: apart from a reference to taking up one's cross in saying 55, the gospel does not discuss his suffering, death, or resurrection. He is not called Christ, Messiah, or Lord, and when he calls himself a "son of man" (saying 86), it is in the generic sense of a human being.

Salvation in Thomas comes through self-knowledge and through recognizing the hidden meaning of Jesus' sayings, not through a future coming of God's kingdom; the kingdom is described as both inside and outside the person (saying 3). Other sayings call for making "the two one" and male and female "a single one" (22). Some reject outward forms of piety such as fasting, prayer, and charity (6, 14).

Many of the sayings and parables have parallels in the synoptic gospels; Simon Gathercole counts fourteen parables, eleven of which are paralleled in the synoptics, though counts vary with how broadly "parable" is defined. Thomas also contains parables found nowhere else, such as those of the jar of meal (97) and the assassin (98). Its parables lack the allegorical interpretations attached to some of their canonical counterparts. Saying 12 directs the disciples to James the Just as their leader, and in saying 13 Thomas is entrusted with secret teaching. The final saying, in which Jesus says he will make Mary male, is among the most debated.

Most scholars think Thomas was first written in the Koine Greek language, though some argue for an Aramaic or Syriac original behind parts of it.

== Discovery of the Nag Hammadi library and publication ==
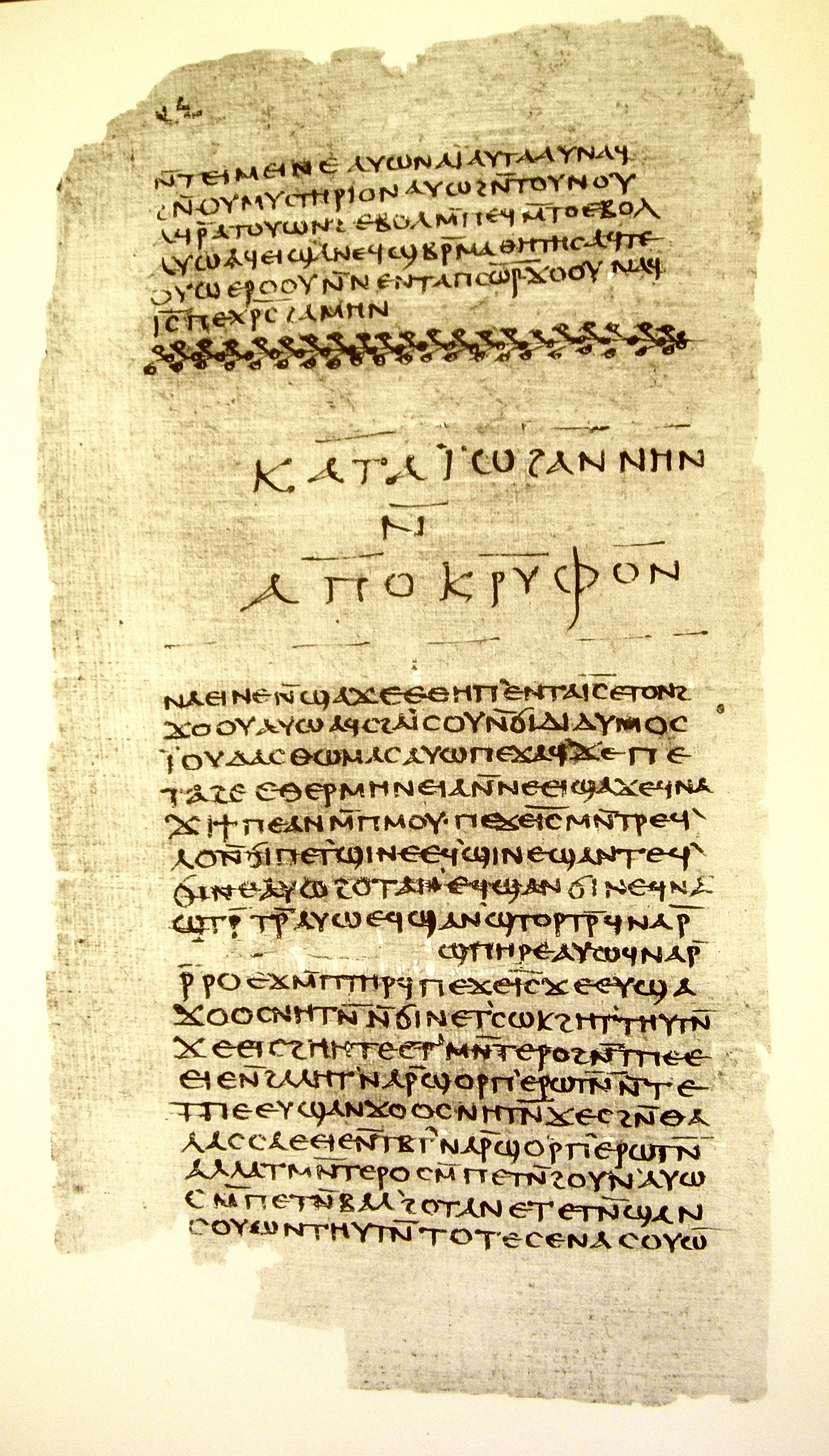
Nag Hammadi Codex II, folio 32, the beginning of the Gospel of Thomas

The Gospel of Thomas circulated in early Christianity, although its origins are debated. From the third century on, church writers mention a gospel "according to Thomas", generally with hostility. Condemned as heretical by proto-orthodox Christians, it was eventually lost. Before 1945, modern scholars knew of the work only through these hostile references.

=== Codex II ===
The only complete copy is in Nag Hammadi Codex II, where it is the second of seven works. It is written in the Coptic language, and is almost certainly a translation from Greek. The codex is one of twelve papyrus codices, with part of a thirteenth, that were found buried in a sealed jar near Nag Hammadi in Upper Egypt. James M. Robinson researched what became the standard account of the find from interviews held some thirty years later: local farmers came upon the jar in December 1945 while digging for fertilizer. (Note: The details of the story have been questioned. Mark Goodacre says that the December 1945 date, though now universally given, is "plausible but not watertight". It depends on the finder's memory some thirty years after the event, and the accounts differ on who was present. The 1974 facsimile edition of Codex II places the find "late in 1945 or early in 1946".) The codices are generally dated to the fourth century. Scrap papyrus used to stiffen the covers of some of them includes receipts from the 340s, but how much later the books were made is unknown. Codex II has no such papyrus in its binding, and Bentley Layton dates it paleographically by its handwriting to the first half of the fourth century. The Coptic translation itself was made no earlier than the third century, when Coptic began to be written as a literary language; Codex II was likely created sometime later than the original translation, as it contains what appear to be transcription errors, suggesting a scribe copying an existing work.

Who owned the codices, and why they were buried, is unknown. The site is a few miles from early Pachomian monasteries, and some scholars suggest that monks hid the books after Athanasius, bishop of Alexandria, ordered the rejection of apocryphal books in his Easter letter of 367. Others regard any connection with the Pachomian monasteries as possible but unproven. Others think a monastic origin unlikely; Stephen Emmel suggests that it was discarded by educated Egyptians who lived in the towns of the Nile Valley. Burying the books in a jar suggests that whoever hid them meant to preserve them, not destroy them.

The texts reached scholars slowly. The codices passed through the hands of villagers and antiquities dealers before the Egyptian authorities took custody of them. Thomas was among the first texts of the library to be published more broadly. Jean Doresse identified it in 1948, while Codex II was still in private hands. Photographs of its pages were published in 1956 in a volume edited by Pahor Labib, director of the Coptic Museum, and in 1958 Johannes Leipoldt published a German translation based on them. The editio princeps, the first edition of the Coptic text, followed in 1959. It was prepared by an international team of scholars and published with translations in English, French, German, and Dutch.

A facsimile edition of Codex II was published in 1974. A critical edition of the Gospel of Thomas was published in 1989, with an English translation by Thomas O. Lambdin. The manuscript is held by the Coptic Museum in Old Cairo.

=== Oxyrhynchus papyrus fragments ===
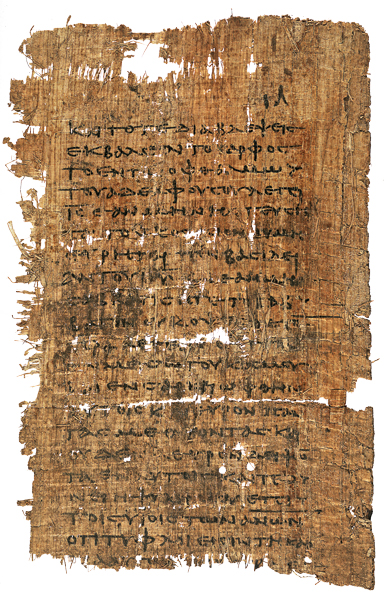
P. Oxy. 1

Three Greek fragments of the Gospel of Thomas were found in Oxyrhynchus, in Egypt, by Bernard Grenfell and Arthur Hunt. They were among the first papyri published from the site: Papyrus Oxyrhynchus 1 (P. Oxy. 1) in 1897, as Logia Iesou: Sayings of Our Lord, and P. Oxy. 654 and 655 in 1904. The fragments prompted debate over how to fill their gaps and what work they came from. P. Oxy. 654 names Thomas, and some scholars suggested that the fragments belonged to the Gospel of Thomas mentioned by the Church Fathers. Grenfell and Hunt, like most scholars of the time, assumed that the Gospel of Thomas mentioned in early church writings was what is now called the Infancy Gospel of Thomas, an unrelated work. The discovery of the complete Coptic text made a firm identification of the Thomas Oxyrhynchus fragments possible. By 1952 Henri-Charles Puech recognized that the three fragments came from the same Gospel of Thomas as found in Codex II.

The fragments come from three different manuscripts that had been copied separately, suggesting the work was being frequently copied in the third century and there was interest in distribution of the gospel then.} They are the oldest surviving copies of Thomas, up to a century and a half older than the Coptic, and they show that the gospel circulated in Greek at an early date. Harold W. Attridge dates P. Oxy. 1 to shortly after 200 AD, P. Oxy. 655 to between 200 and 250, and P. Oxy. 654 to the middle of the third century. Other estimates range from the late second century to the end of the third. Larry Hurtado notes that these three copies of the Gospel of Thomas put it at the level of the Epistle of James, Ephesians, and the Acts of Paul among surviving Christian manuscripts from before 300, and ahead of the Gospel of Mark, though such counts are only a rough guide to popularity.

The three fragments:

- P. Oxy. 1 (Bodleian Library, Oxford): a leaf from a papyrus codex, containing sayings 26–33. Saying 30 ends with words found at the end of saying 77 in the Coptic. The leaf is numbered 11, which suggests that another text came before Thomas in the codex.
- P. Oxy. 654 (British Library, London): part of a roll, written on the back of a land survey, containing the prologue and sayings 1–7.
- P. Oxy. 655 (Houghton Library, Harvard): eight fragments of a roll, two of them now lost, containing parts of sayings 24 and 36–39. Four of the fragments are too small to identify.

How the copies were used is debated. Hurtado argues from their formats and hands that all three were personal copies for private study, not texts read as scripture in group worship. Two are rolls, a format Christians seldom used for scripture, and one of those is written on the back of a reused document. AnneMarie Luijendijk agrees that they were mostly read privately, but argues that the reading aids in P. Oxy. 654 suggest it was meant to be read aloud, and that the codex P. Oxy. 1 may have been read in worship.

The Greek and Coptic texts differ in places. The sayings in the fragments follow the Coptic order, except that the end of saying 77 appears as part of saying 30. Elsewhere the Greek is sometimes longer (saying 3), sometimes shorter (saying 2), and sometimes simply different (saying 6). Attridge traces most of the differences to loose translation, scribal error, or accidental omission, and a few to deliberate editing. In his view the fragments are too few and too damaged to show how the Greek copies relate to one another or to the Coptic. Scholars disagree about what the differences mean. John P. Meier takes them, together with the different wording of a saying quoted by Hippolytus, as signs that Thomas circulated in more than one form and went through several stages of editing. Simon Gathercole argues that the differences between the Greek and Coptic have been exaggerated. In his view, the order and vocabulary of the two largely match, and the Coptic goes back in substance to a second-century Greek text much like the fragments.

=== Mentions in early Christian writings ===
The earliest surviving written references to the Gospel of Thomas are found in the writings of Hippolytus of Rome (c. 222–235) and Origen of Alexandria (c. 233). Hippolytus wrote in his Refutation of All Heresies 5.7.20:

[The Naassenes] speak [...] of a nature which is both hidden and revealed at the same time and which they call the sought-after kingdom of heaven which is in a human being. They transmit a tradition concerning this in the Gospel entitled "According to Thomas," which states expressly, "The one who seeks me will find me in children of seven years and older, for there, hidden in the fourteenth aeon, I am revealed."

This appears to be a reference to saying 4 of Thomas, although the wording differs significantly. As translated by Thomas O. Lambdin, saying 4 reads: "Jesus said, 'the man old in days will not hesitate to ask a small child seven days old about the place of life, and he will live. For many who are first will become last, and they will become one and the same". In this context, the preceding reference to the "sought-after reign of the heavens within a person" appears to be a reference to sayings 2 and 3. Hippolytus also appears to quote saying 11 in Refutation 5.8.32, but without attribution.

Origen listed the "Gospel according to Thomas" as being among the heterodox apocryphal gospels known to him (Hom. in Luc. 1). He condemned a book called "Gospel of Thomas" as heretical; it is not clear that it is the same gospel of Thomas, however, as he possibly meant the Infancy Gospel of Thomas.

In the 4th and 5th centuries, various Church Fathers wrote that the Gospel of Thomas was highly valued by Mani. In the 4th century, Cyril of Jerusalem mentioned a "Gospel of Thomas" twice in his Catechesis: "The Manichaeans also wrote a Gospel according to Thomas, which being tinctured with the fragrance of the evangelic title corrupts the souls of the simple sort." and "Let none read the Gospel according to Thomas: for it is the work not of one of the twelve Apostles, but of one of the three wicked disciples of Manes." Despite these claims, the Gospel of Thomas was created before the advent of Manichaeism, so Cyril is incorrect if he was referring to the same Gospel of Thomas. The 5th-century Gelasian Decree includes "A Gospel attributed to Thomas which the Manichaean use" in its list of heretical books.

== Date of composition ==
Dating the Gospel of Thomas is complex, and varies by what exactly is being dated. Scholars argue on the date of the origin of the sayings that went into it, the date of the first written collection, and the date of the Greek and Coptic versions. As a collection of sayings without a narrative framework, it could have gained or lost individual sayings over time. Proposed dates range from the middle of the 1st century to the middle of the 2nd century or later, largely depending on whether a scholar regards Thomas as independent of the canonical gospels or dependent on them. (Note: Proposed dates for the composition of the Gospel of Thomas include: April DeConick: a core collection of sayings from c. 30–50 AD, expanded until about 120 AD.; Stevan L. Davies: c. 50–70 AD.; Helmut Koester: well before Justin Martyr, possibly in the 1st century.; Marvin Meyer: a first collection of the sayings in the 1st century.; Stephen J. Patterson: around 70–80 AD, for a collection whose contents continued to change over time.; Ismo Dunderberg: 70–100 AD, about the same time as the Gospel of John.; Richard Valantasis: 100–110 AD.; Bart Ehrman: the early 2nd century.; Risto Uro: c. 100–140 AD.; Simon Gathercole: between 135 and 200 AD.; Mark Goodacre: the 140s.; Beate Blatz: about the middle of the 2nd century.; Nicholas Perrin: after 175 AD, and probably before 200.; Craig A. Evans: not before 175–180 AD.) Richard Valantasis dates Thomas to 100–110 AD, with some of the material, in his view, originating from as early as 30–60 AD.

April DeConick argues that the gospel grew by accretion from a core collection of sayings dating to c. 30–50 AD, which was expanded in Syria until about 120 AD. Bart Ehrman says that while DeConick's argument is plausible, whether Thomas rests on an earlier written source cannot be determined with certainty.

Scholars generally fall into one of two main camps:

- An "early camp" favoring a date for the core "before the end of the first century," prior to or approximately contemporary with the composition of the canonical gospels.
- A more common "late camp" favoring a date in the 2nd century, after composition of the canonical gospels.

In August 2023, the Egypt Exploration Society published the second century Papyrus Oxyrhynchus 5575, which includes the earliest attestation of material associated with the Gospel of Thomas.

=== Argument for early composition ===
==== Form of the gospel ====
Theissen and Merz argue the genre of a collection of sayings was one of the earliest forms in which material about Jesus was handed down. They assert that other collections of sayings, such as the Q source and the collection underlying Mark 4, were absorbed into larger narratives and no longer survive as independent documents, and that no later collections in this form survive. Marvin Meyer also asserted that the genre of a "sayings collection" is indicative of the 1st century, and that in particular the "use of parables without allegorical amplification" seems to antedate the canonical gospels.

==== Independence from synoptic gospels ====
Stevan L. Davies argues that the apparent independence of the ordering of sayings in Thomas from that of their parallels in the synoptics shows that Thomas was not evidently reliant upon the canonical gospels and probably predated them. Some authors argue that Thomas was a source for Mark, usually considered the earliest of the synoptic gospels. Several authors argue that when the sayings in Thomas do have parallels in the synoptics, the version in Thomas often seems closer to the source. Theissen and Merz give sayings 31 (Rejection at Nazareth) and 65 (Parable of the Wicked Husbandmen) as examples of this. Koester agrees, citing especially the parables contained in sayings 8, 9, 57, 63, 64 and 65. In the few instances where the version in Thomas seems to be dependent on the synoptics, Koester suggests, this may be due to the influence of the person who translated the text from Greek into Coptic.

Koester also argues that the absence of narrative materials, such as those found in the canonical gospels, in Thomas makes it unlikely that the gospel is "an eclectic excerpt from the gospels of the New Testament". He also cites the absence of the eschatological sayings considered characteristic of Q source to show the independence of Thomas from that source.

==== Relationship to the Gospel of John ====
Thomas shares a number of themes with the Gospel of John, such as light and life and the use of "Father" for God, but it never quotes John directly. The first study of the parallels, by Raymond E. Brown in 1962–63, concluded that Thomas did not use John itself, and that any Johannine influence came indirectly through one of Thomas's sources. Most scholars accepted this view. Helmut Koester instead argued that the two gospels drew on a shared tradition of sayings and interpreted it in opposite ways. Thomas presents coming from the light and returning to it as true of every believer who has knowledge, while John restricts such statements to Jesus. Koester thought John was deliberately rejecting the Thomasine view.

In the 1990s, Gregory J. Riley, April DeConick, and Elaine Pagels reversed the direction of influence that Brown had proposed. They argued that the Gospel of John was written partly in response to Christians who revered the traditions centering on Thomas, which would make the Gospel of Thomas (or its traditions) older than John. They disagree about what the dispute was over: bodily resurrection for Riley, whether God is known through visionary ascent or through faith for DeConick, and the interpretation of the creation story in Genesis for Pagels. Their main evidence is John's portrait of Thomas, whom only John presents critically. In three scenes Thomas misunderstands Jesus: he assumes that going to raise Lazarus will mean their deaths, he does not know the way to the place where Jesus is going, and he refuses to believe in the risen Jesus until he can see and touch his wounds. Riley, followed by Pagels, argues that John invented the story of "Doubting Thomas", portraying Thomas negatively in order to turn his followers away from their views. In it, Jesus rebukes Thomas and says, "Blessed are those who have not seen and yet have come to believe." DeConick reads the story as a rejection of the Thomasine hope of seeing God in a vision, not as an argument for a physical resurrection. Pagels also reads John's prologue, in which the world fails to recognize the divine light, as a rejection of Thomas's teaching that the light is already present within every person (sayings 24 and 50). DeConick suggests that if John really was answering the Gospel of Thomas itself, Thomas would date to around 70–80 AD. DeConick places all of the material that Thomas shares only with John among the later additions to the gospel, not its earliest core.

Critics have questioned the conflict thesis. Ismo Dunderberg argues there is no clear literary dependence between the two gospels. In his view, they took different positions on shared topics without knowing each other's positions, and their differences do not show that the communities behind them were in conflict. He dates both gospels to about the same period, 70–100 AD. Christopher W. Skinner argues that Thomas's role in John is part of a wider pattern in that gospel, in which uncomprehending characters serve as foils for Jesus' words and deeds. Riley reads the "house" that Jesus will destroy in saying 71 as his body, so that Thomas denies bodily resurrection; DeConick and others reject this reading. Simon Gathercole argues that Thomas had no influence on the canonical gospels, John's included.

==== Role of James ====
Albert Hogeterp argues that the gospel's saying 12, which attributes leadership of the community to James the Just rather than to Peter, agrees with the description of the early Jerusalem church by Paul in Galatians 2:1–14 and may reflect a tradition predating 70 AD. Meyer also lists "uncertainty about James the righteous, the brother of Jesus" as characteristic of a 1st-century origin.

In later traditions (most notably in the Acts of Thomas, Book of Thomas the Contender, etc.), Thomas is regarded as the twin brother of Jesus.

==== Depiction of Peter and Matthew ====
In saying 13, Peter and Matthew are depicted as unable to understand the true significance or identity of Jesus. Patterson argues that this can be interpreted as a criticism against the school of Christianity associated with the Gospel of Matthew, and that "[t]his sort of rivalry seems more at home in the first century than later", when all the apostles had become revered figures.

==== Parallel with Paul ====
According to Meyer, Thomas's saying 17 – "I shall give you what no eye has seen, what no ear has heard and no hand has touched, and what has not come into the human heart" – is strikingly similar to what Paul wrote in 1 Corinthians 2:9, which was itself an allusion to Isaiah 64:4.

=== Argument for late composition ===
The late camp dates Thomas some time after 100 AD, generally in the early second century. They generally believe that although the text was composed around the mid-second century, it contains earlier sayings such as those originally found in the New Testament gospels of which Thomas was in some sense dependent in addition to inauthentic and possibly authentic independent sayings not found in any other extant text.

==== Dependence on the New Testament ====
Several scholars have argued that the sayings in Thomas reflect conflations and harmonizations dependent on the canonical gospels. For example, saying 10 and 16 appear to contain a redacted harmonization of Luke 12:49, 12:51–52 and Matthew 10:34–35. In this case it has been suggested that the dependence is best explained by the author of Thomas making use of an earlier harmonized oral tradition based on Matthew and Luke. Biblical scholar Craig A. Evans also subscribes to this view and says that "Over half of the New Testament writings are quoted, paralleled, or alluded to in Thomas... I'm not aware of a Christian writing prior to 150 AD that references this much of the New Testament." Mark Goodacre also argues that Thomas is dependent on the synoptics.

Another argument made for the late dating of Thomas is based upon the fact that saying 5 in the original Greek (Papyrus Oxyrhynchus 654) seems to follow the vocabulary used in the Gospel of Luke (Luke 8:17), and not the vocabulary used in the Gospel of Mark (Mark 4:22). According to this argument – which presupposes the rectitude of Marcan priority in which the author of Luke is seen as having used the gospel of Mark to compose their gospel – if the author of Thomas did, as saying 5 suggests, refer to a pre-existing Gospel of Luke, rather than Mark's vocabulary, then the Gospel of Thomas must have been composed after both Mark and Luke, the latter of which is dated to between 60 and 90 AD.

Another saying that employs similar vocabulary to that used in Luke rather than Mark is saying 31 in the original Greek (Papyrus Oxyrhynchus 1), where Luke 4:24's term dektos ('acceptable') is employed rather than Mark 6:4's atimos ('without honor'). The word dektos (in all its cases and genders) is clearly typical of Luke, since it is only employed by the author in the canonical gospels Luke 4:19, 4:24, and Acts 10:35. Thus, the argument runs, the Greek Thomas has clearly been at least influenced by Luke's characteristic vocabulary. (Note: For general discussion, see Meier 1991, pp. 137, 163–64 n. 133. See also Tuckett 1988, pp. 132–57, esp. p. 146.)

Scholars are deeply divided on whether Thomas depends on the synoptic tradition. John P. Meier argues that it does: testing fifteen sayings that have synoptic parallels, six of them parables, he finds each more likely than not to depend on the synoptic gospels, directly or indirectly, so that Thomas offers no independent attestation for sayings of Jesus. He sees its importance instead in showing how the synoptic gospels were received in the second century.

==== Syriac origin ====
Several scholars argue that Thomas is dependent on Syriac writings, including unique versions of the canonical gospels. They contend that many sayings of the Gospel of Thomas are more similar to Syriac translations of the canonical gospels than their record in the original Greek. Craig A. Evans states that saying 54 in Thomas, which speaks of the poor and the kingdom of heaven, is more similar to the Syriac version of Matthew 5:3 than the Greek version of that passage or the parallel in Luke 6:20.

Klyne Snodgrass says that saying 65–66 of Thomas containing the Parable of the Wicked Tenants appears to be dependent on the early harmonization of Mark and Luke found in the old Syriac gospels. He concludes that Thomas's version does not preserve the earliest form of the parable but was shaped by this harmonizing tendency in Syria. If Thomas were the earliest, each of the evangelists would have had to expand the parable in a different direction, and the text would then have been trimmed back to its Syriac form during transmission. He considers it much more likely that Thomas depends on the canonical tradition as abbreviated and harmonized in oral transmission.

Nicholas Perrin argues that Thomas is dependent on the Diatessaron, which was composed shortly after 172 by Tatian in Syria. Perrin explains the order of the sayings by attempting to demonstrate that almost all adjacent sayings are connected by Syriac catchwords, whereas in Coptic or Greek, catchwords have been found for only less than half of the pairs of adjacent sayings. Peter J. Williams analyzed Perrin's alleged Syriac catchwords and found them implausible. Robert F. Shedinger wrote that since Perrin attempts to reconstruct an Old Syriac version of Thomas without first establishing Thomas's reliance on the Diatessaron, Perrin's logic seems circular.

Many scholars are not convinced that Thomas was originally written in Syriac or Aramaic. Francis T. Fallon and Ron Cameron examined the arguments for a Syriac or Aramaic original language in 1988, but argued that the work was probably composed in Greek.

==== Lack of apocalyptic themes ====
Bart D. Ehrman argues that the historical Jesus was an apocalyptic preacher, and that his apocalyptic beliefs and the views of his earliest followers are recorded in the earliest Christian documents: Mark and the authentic Pauline epistles. The Gospel of Thomas proclaims that the Kingdom of God is already present for those who understand the secret message of Jesus (saying 113) and lacks apocalyptic themes. Because of this, Ehrman argues the Gospel of Thomas was probably composed by a Gnostic in the early 2nd century. Ehrman still considers that some of its sayings may originate from the historical Jesus, though he sees the whole collection as set within a later Gnostic framework.

Elaine Pagels argues that the Jesus of Thomas rejects a literal understanding of the Kingdom of God as a place or a future event (sayings 3 and 113), presenting it instead as a matter of self-knowledge; she reads saying 22's call to "make the two one" as describing a transformed state of consciousness.

Craig A. Evans has argued that the Gospel of Thomas originated in late 2nd-century Syria and depends on the synoptic gospels as known through Tatian's Diatessaron.

N.T. Wright, Anglican bishop and professor of New Testament history, also sees the dating of Thomas in the 2nd or 3rd century. Wright's reasoning for this dating is that the "narrative framework" of 1st-century Judaism and the New Testament is radically different from the worldview expressed in the sayings collected in the Gospel of Thomas. Thomas makes an anachronistic mistake by turning Jesus the Jewish prophet into a Hellenistic/Cynic philosopher. Wright concludes his section on the Gospel of Thomas in his book The New Testament and the People of God in this way:

[Thomas's] implicit story has to do with a figure who imparts a secret, hidden wisdom to those close to him, so that they can perceive a new truth and be saved by it. "The Thomas Christians are told the truth about their divine origins, and given the secret passwords that will prove effective in the return journey to their heavenly home." This is, obviously, the non-historical story of Gnosticism [...] It is simply the case that, on good historical grounds, it is far more likely that the book represents a radical translation, and indeed subversion, of first-century Christianity into a quite different sort of religion, than that it represents the original of which the longer gospels are distortions [...] Thomas reflects a symbolic universe, and a worldview, which are radically different from those of the early Judaism and Christianity.

== Relation to the New Testament canon ==
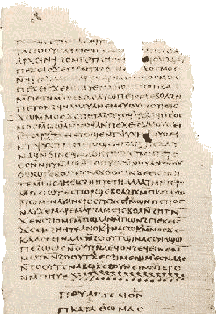
Last page of the Gospel of Thomas

Although arguments about some potential New Testament books, such as The Shepherd of Hermas and the Book of Revelation, continued well into the 4th century, four canonical gospels, attributed to Matthew, Mark, Luke, and John, were accepted among proto-orthodox Christians at least as early as the mid-2nd century. Tatian's widely used Diatessaron, compiled between 160 and 175 AD, utilized the four gospels without any consideration of others. Irenaeus of Lyons wrote in the late 2nd century that: "since there are four-quarters of the earth [...] it is fitting that the church should have four pillars [...] the four Gospels." and then shortly thereafter made the first known quotation from a fourth gospel – the now-canonical version of the Gospel of John. The late 2nd-century Muratorian fragment also recognizes only the three synoptic gospels and John.

Bible scholar Bruce Metzger wrote regarding the formation of the New Testament canon:

Although the fringes of the emerging canon remained unsettled for generations, a high degree of unanimity concerning the greater part of the New Testament was attained among the very diverse and scattered congregations of believers not only throughout the Mediterranean world, but also over an area extending from Britain to Mesopotamia.

== Relation to the Thomasine milieu ==
The question also arises as to various sects' usage of other works attributed to Thomas and their relation to this work.

The Book of Thomas the Contender, also from Nag Hammadi, is foremost among these, but the extensive Acts of Thomas provides the mythological connections. The short and comparatively straightforward Apocalypse of Thomas has no immediate connection with the synoptic gospels, while the canonical Jude – if the name can be taken to refer to Judas Thomas Didymus – certainly attests to early intra-Christian conflict.

The Infancy Gospel of Thomas, shorn of its mythological connections, is difficult to connect specifically to the Gospel of Thomas, but the Acts of Thomas contains the Hymn of the Pearl whose content is reflected in the Psalms of Thomas found in Manichaean literature. These psalms, which otherwise reveal Mandaean connections, also contain material overlapping with the Gospel of Thomas.

== Relation to other Christian texts ==
Melissa Harl Sellew has argued there are striking parallels between the Gospel of Thomas and Apophthegmata Patrum ("Sayings of the Desert Fathers").

== Importance and author ==
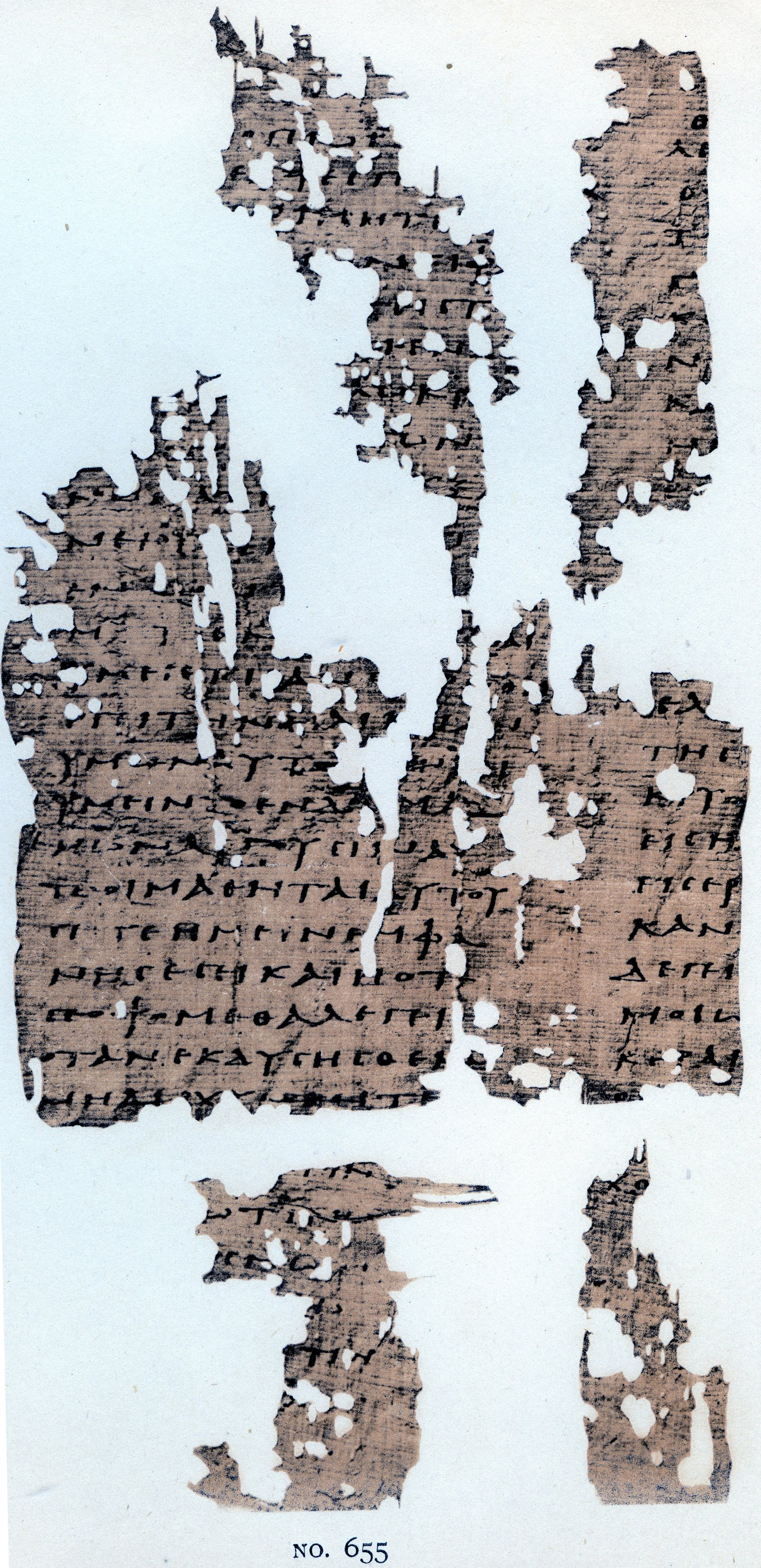
P. Oxy. 655

Considered by some as one of the earliest accounts of the teachings of Jesus, the Gospel of Thomas is regarded by some scholars as one of the most important texts in understanding early Christianity outside the New Testament. In terms of faith, however, no major Christian group accepts this gospel as canonical or authoritative. It is an important work for scholars working on the Q document, which itself is thought to be a collection of sayings or teachings upon which the gospels of Matthew and Luke are partly based. Although no copy of Q has ever been discovered, the fact that Thomas is similarly a "sayings" gospel is viewed by some scholars as an indication that the early Christians did write collections of the sayings of Jesus, bolstering the Q hypothesis.

Modern scholars do not consider Thomas the Apostle the author of this document and the author remains unknown. J. Ménard produced a summary of the academic consensus in the mid-1970s that stated that the gospel was probably a very late text written by a Gnostic author, thus having very little relevance to the study of the early development of Christianity. Scholarly views of Gnosticism and the Gospel of Thomas have since become more nuanced and diverse.

In the 4th century Cyril of Jerusalem considered the author a disciple of Mani who was also called Thomas. Cyril stated:

Mani had three disciples: Thomas, Baddas and Hermas. Let no one read the Gospel according to Thomas. For he is not one of the twelve apostles but one of the three wicked disciples of Mani.

Many scholars consider the Gospel of Thomas to be a Gnostic text, since it was found in a collection of texts that contain Gnostic themes, and perhaps presupposes a Gnostic worldview. However, this collection contains a number of non-Gnostic works, such as an excerpt from Plato's Republic, and several Hermetic texts. (Note: For example, Douglas M. Parrott identifies the treatise "The Discourse on the Eighth and Ninth" as Hermetic.) In addition, others reject this interpretation, because Thomas lacks the full-blown mythology of Gnosticism as described by Irenaeus of Lyons (c. 185), and because Gnostics frequently appropriated and used a large "range of scripture from Genesis to the Psalms to Homer, from the Synoptics to John to the letters of Paul." The mysticism of the Gospel of Thomas lacks many themes found in second century Gnosticism, including any allusion to a fallen Sophia or an evil Demiurge. According to David W. Kim, the association of the Thomasines and Gnosticism is anachronistic and the book seems to predate the Gnostic movements. Bentley Layton and David Brakke include the Gospel of Thomas in their anthology The Gnostic Scriptures, but in a separate part on a "school of St. Thomas" whose literature is not clearly classifiable as Valentinian or otherwise Gnostic.

== Historicity ==
Some scholars (most notably those belonging to the Jesus Seminar) believe that the Gospel of Thomas was written independently of the canonical gospels, and therefore is a useful guide to historical Jesus research. These scholars may utilize one of several critical tools in biblical scholarship, the criterion of multiple attestation, to help build cases for historical reliability of the sayings of Jesus. By finding those sayings in the Gospel of Thomas that overlap with the Gospel of the Hebrews, Q, the Gospels of Mark, Matthew, Luke and John, and the Pauline epistles, scholars feel such sayings represent "multiple attestations" and therefore are more likely to come from a historical Jesus than sayings that are only singly attested. However, Bart Ehrman states that the Gospel of Thomas has very little value in historical Jesus research, because it places no importance on the physical experiences of Jesus (e.g. his crucifixion) or the physical existence of believers.

John P. Meier has argued against the historicity of the Gospel of Thomas, stating that it cannot be a reliable source and is a Gnostic theological text. He also holds that the parables found only in Thomas fail to meet the standard criteria of historicity.

== Representation of women ==
Interpretations of the Gospel of Thomas's view of women vary widely: some read it as one of the most chauvinistic voices of early Christianity, and others as opening more positive possibilities for women.

=== Women disciples ===
The Gospel of Thomas names six people close to Jesus, two of them women: Mary Magdalene and Salome. Antti Marjanen argues that, because so few people are named, their inclusion is purposeful. In sayings 21 and 61 their exchanges with Jesus clarify the nature of discipleship: they do not misunderstand him, but they do not yet understand enough to reach the level of Thomas. The woman disciples' lack of understanding should not be overstated, since the other disciples need instruction too. Jorunn Jacobsen Buckley reads saying 61, in which Salome declares herself Jesus' disciple, together with saying 114, as Salome transcending being a human female and becoming a "living spirit" who has been initiated into Jesus's mysteries.

=== Gender and the "single one" ===
Saying 22 makes entry into the kingdom depend on making "the two into one": the inner like the outer, the upper like the lower, and male and female into a single one, "so that the male will not be male nor the female be female". Richard Valantasis reads the "single one" as a third gender that replaces the categories of male and female. Melissa Harl Sellew finds the call to make the inner like the outer resonant from a transgender perspective, although she finds the idea of doing away with gender altogether less affirming. She argues that the "single one" envisioned is still coded as male in practice.

=== Saying 114 ===
Simon Peter said to them, "Make Mary leave us, for females don't deserve life." Jesus said, "Look, I will guide her to make her male, so that she too may become a living spirit resembling you males. For every female who makes herself male will enter the domain of heaven."

— Saying 114, translated by Richard Valantasis

The final saying of the Gospel of Thomas is one of its most debated. Marjanen distinguishes three readings of a woman "making herself male", which need not exclude one another: a literal adoption of male dress and appearance by ascetic women; a return to the undivided state of Adam before the sexes were separated; and a symbolic movement from the earthly, associated with the female, to the spiritual, associated with the male. In his view, Jesus' reply gives women an equal claim to salvation, but in language that devalues them, and the saying was probably a later addition to the gospel. Buckley argues that it describes a reversal of the creation story in Genesis 2: a woman must first become male, as Eve was taken from Adam, and then become a "living spirit", the state of Adam before the sexes were divided. Marjanen finds little support in the text for this two-stage reading.

Bart Ehrman reads the saying in light of the common Greek and Roman view that women were imperfect men: since salvation in Thomas is a return to an original unity, women must first become male. Valantasis sees no misogyny in it. The goal of becoming neither male nor female applies to all seekers and is here made explicit for women, and Jesus speaks of "you males", not "us males", setting himself apart as a kind of third gender. (Note: Translations differ on this phrase. Valantasis, Thomas O. Lambdin, and Simon Gathercole render it "a living spirit resembling you males", while April DeConick has "a living spirit – male, resembling you".) Sellew finds the saying male-centered, and doubts attempts to explain it away as irony or as a later addition. Building on Jesus' reference to "you males", she sees this reading as Jesus standing outside gender, a model for all people of every gender.

== Translations ==
Selected modern translations of the Gospel of Thomas into English include:

- Blatz, Beate (1991). "The Coptic Gospel of Thomas". In Schneemelcher, Wilhelm (ed.). New Testament Apocrypha: Volume One: Gospels and Related Writings. Translated by Wilson, Robert McLachlan (Revised ed.). Westminster John Knox Press. pp. 110–133. ISBN 0-664-22721-X.
- DeConick, April D. (2006). "The Complete Gospel of Thomas". The Original Gospel of Thomas in Translation: With a Commentary and New English Translation of the Complete Gospel. Library of New Testament Studies 287. T&T Clark. pp. 32–43. ISBN 0-567-04382-7.
- Ehrman, Bart; Pleše, Zlatko (2011). The Apocryphal Gospels: Texts and Translations. Oxford University Press. pp. 303–349. ISBN 978-0-19-973210-4.
- Elliott, James Keith (1993). The Apocryphal New Testament. Oxford University Press. pp. 123–147. ISBN 0-19-826182-9.
- Lambdin, Thomas O. (1996). "The Gospel of Thomas (II,2)". In Robinson, James M. (ed.). The Nag Hammadi Library in English (4th revised ed.). Brill. pp. 124–138. ISBN 90-04-08856-3. (introduction by Helmut Koester)
- Layton, Bentley; Brakke, David (2021). "The Gospel According to Thomas". The Gnostic Scriptures. Anchor Yale Bible Reference Library (2nd ed.). Yale University Press. pp. 555–588. ISBN 978-0-300-20854-2.
- Meyer, Marvin W. (2013) [2007]. "The Gospel of Thomas with the Greek Gospel of Thomas". In Meyer, Marvin W. (ed.). The Nag Hammadi Scriptures. HarperOne. ISBN 9780062046369.
- Patterson, Stephen J.; Bethge, Hans-Gebhard; Robinson, James M. (2011). The Fifth Gospel: The Gospel of Thomas Comes of Age (Revised ed.). T&T Clark. ISBN 978-0-567-28561-4.

== See also ==
- British Library Or 4926
- Common Sayings Source
- Five Trees
- List of Gospels

== Bibliography ==
- Blatz, Beate (1991). "The Coptic Gospel of Thomas". In Schneemelcher, Wilhelm (ed.). New Testament Apocrypha: Volume One: Gospels and Related Writings. Translated by Wilson, Robert McLachlan (Revised ed.). Westminster John Knox Press. pp. 110–133. ISBN 0-664-22721-X.
- Bock, Darrell (2006). The Missing Gospels. Thomas Nelson. ISBN 9780785212942. OCLC 63178769.
- Bock, Darrell (2009). "Response to John Dominic Crossan". In Beilby, James K.; Eddy, Paul Rhodes (eds.). The Historical Jesus: Five Views. InterVarsity Press. ISBN 9780830838684. OCLC 421949536.
- Brown, Ian Phillip (2019). "Where Indeed Was the Gospel of Thomas Written? Thomas in Alexandria". Journal of Biblical Literature. 138 (2): 451–472. doi:10.15699/jbl.1382.2019.523931. S2CID 197843780.
- Buckley, Jorunn Jacobsen (1985). "An Interpretation of Logion 114 in "The Gospel of Thomas"". Novum Testamentum. 27 (3): 245–272. JSTOR 1560876.
- Carlson, Stephen C. (2014). "Origen's Use of the Gospel of Thomas". In Charlesworth, James H.; McDonald, Lee Martin (eds.). Sacra Scriptura: How "Non-Canonical" Text Functioned in Early Judaism and Early Christianity. Jewish and Christian Texts in Contexts and Related Studies 20. T&T Clark.
- Davies, Stevan (1983a). The Gospel of Thomas and Christian Wisdom. Seabury Press. ISBN 9780816424566. OCLC 8827492.
- Davies, Stevan (1983b). "Thomas: The Fourth Synoptic Gospel". The Biblical Archaeologist. 46 (1). The American Schools of Oriental Research: 6–14. doi:10.2307/3209683. JSTOR 3209683. S2CID 171644324.
- Davies, Stevan (1992). "The Christology and Protology of the Gospel of Thomas". Journal of Biblical Literature. 111 (4): 663–682. doi:10.2307/3267438. JSTOR 3267438. Archived from the original on 27 July 2020.
- Davies, Stevan (1996). "The Use of the Gospel of Thomas in the Gospel of Mark". Neotestamentica. 30 (2): 307–334.
- Davies, Stevan (n.d.). "Correlation Analysis". users.misericordia.edu. Archived from the original on 5 March 2017.
- DeConick, April D. (2001). Voices of the Mystics: Early Christian Discourse in the Gospels of John and Thomas and Other Ancient Christian Literature. Journal for the Study of the New Testament Supplement Series 157. Sheffield Academic Press. ISBN 9781841271903. OCLC 46393476.
- DeConick, April D. (2006). The Original Gospel of Thomas in Translation. Bloomsbury Academic. ISBN 9780567043825. OCLC 60837918.
- Derrenbacker, Robert (2022). "Echoes of Luke in John 20–21". In Derrenbacker, Robert; Lee, Dorothy; Porter, Muriel (eds.). The Enduring Impact of the Gospel of John: Interdisciplinary Studies. Wipf and Stock Publishers.
- Dunderberg, Ismo (2006). The Beloved Disciple in Conflict? Revisiting the Gospels of John and Thomas. Oxford University Press. ISBN 978-0-19-928496-2.
- Dunn, James D. G.; Rogerson, John William (2003). Eerdmans Commentary on the Bible. Wm. B. Eerdmans. ISBN 9780802837110. OCLC 53059839.
- Edwards, James R. (2002). The Gospel According to Mark. Wm. B. Eerdmans Publishing.
- Ehrman, Bart D. (1999). Jesus: Apocalyptic Prophet of the New Millennium (rev. ed.). Oxford University Press. ISBN 9780195124736. OCLC 470376921.
- Ehrman, Bart (2003a). Lost Christianities: The Battles for Scripture and the Faiths We Never Knew. Oxford University Press. ISBN 9780195141832. OCLC 52335003.
- Ehrman, Bart (2003b). Lost Scriptures: Books that Did Not Make It into the New Testament. Oxford University Press. ISBN 9780199727131. OCLC 57124978.
- Ehrman, Bart D. (2012). Did Jesus Exist?: The Historical Argument for Jesus of Nazareth. Harper Collins. ISBN 9780062089946. OCLC 808490374.
- Ehrman, Bart; Pleše, Zlatko (2011). The Apocryphal Gospels: Texts and Translations. Oxford University Press. ISBN 978-0-19-973210-4.
- Evans, Craig A. (2008). Fabricating Jesus: How Modern Scholars Distort the Gospels. InterVarsity Press. ISBN 978-0-8308-3355-9.
- Fallon, Francis T.; Cameron, Ron (1988). "The Gospel of Thomas: A Forschungsbericht and Analysis". In Haase, Wolfgang (ed.). Aufstieg und Niedergang der römischen Welt. Vol. II.25.6. De Gruyter. pp. 4195–4251. ISBN 3-11-011894-7.
- Farid, Shafik, ed. (2024) [1974]. The Facsimile Edition of the Nag Hammadi Codices: Codex II. Brill. doi:10.1163/9789004438712. ISBN 978-90-04-43871-2.
- Foster, Paul (2009). The Apocryphal Gospels: A Very Short Introduction. Oxford University Press. ISBN 978-0-19-923694-7.
- Frey, Jörg; Popkes, Enno Edzard; Schröter, Jens, eds. (2008). Das Thomasevangelium: Entstehung – Rezeption – Theologie. Beihefte zur Zeitschrift für die neutestamentliche Wissenschaft 157. Walter de Gruyter. ISBN 978-3-11-020246-5.
  - Emmel, Stephen (2008). "The Coptic Gnostic Texts as Witnesses to the Production and Transmission of Gnostic (and Other) Traditions". In Frey, Jörg; Popkes, Enno Edzard; Schröter, Jens (eds.). Das Thomasevangelium: Entstehung – Rezeption – Theologie. Beihefte zur Zeitschrift für die neutestamentliche Wissenschaft 157. Walter de Gruyter. pp. 33–49. ISBN 978-3-11-020246-5.
  - Hurtado, Larry W. (2008). "The Greek Fragments of the Gospel of Thomas as Artefacts: Papyrological Observations on Papyrus Oxyrhynchus 1, Papyrus Oxyrhynchus 654 and Papyrus Oxyrhynchus 655". In Frey, Jörg; Popkes, Enno Edzard; Schröter, Jens (eds.). Das Thomasevangelium: Entstehung – Rezeption – Theologie. Beihefte zur Zeitschrift für die neutestamentliche Wissenschaft 157. Walter de Gruyter. pp. 19–32. ISBN 978-3-11-020246-5.
- Funk, Robert Walter; Hoover, Roy W. (1993). The Five Gospels: The Search for the Authentic Words of Jesus: New Translation and Commentary. Macmillan. ISBN 978-0-685-63458-5.
- Gathercole, Simon J. (2012). The Composition of the Gospel of Thomas: Original Language and Influences. Society for New Testament Studies Monograph Series 151. Cambridge University Press. ISBN 9781107009042.
- Gathercole, Simon J. (2014). The Gospel of Thomas: Introduction and Commentary. Texts and Editions for New Testament Study 11. Brill. ISBN 9789004190412.
- Goodacre, Mark (2012). Thomas and the Gospels: The Case for Thomas's Familiarity with the Synoptics. Wm. B. Eerdmans Publishing Co. ISBN 978-0802867483.
- Grant, Robert M.; Freedman, David Noel (1960). The Secret Sayings of Jesus. Doubleday & Company. OCLC 942353.
- Grenfell, Bernard P.; Hunt, Arthur S. (1897). Sayings of Our Lord from an Early Greek Papyrus. Henry Frowde. OCLC 1084533283.
- Guillaumont, Antoine Jean Baptiste; Puech, Henri-Charles; Quispel, G.; Till, Walter Curt; 'Abd al-Masi-h, Yassah, eds. (1959). Evangelium nach Thomas. Brill. OCLC 1332210700.
- Hogeterp, Albert L. A. (2006). Paul and God's Temple. Peeters. ISBN 9789042917224. OCLC 62741567.
- Johnson, Kevin (1997). "Mark's Use of the Gospel of Thomas Part Two". Neotestamentica.
- Johnson, Stephen R. (2010). "Hippolytus's Refutatio and the Gospel of Thomas". Journal of Early Christian Studies. 18 (2). The Johns Hopkins University Press: 305–326. doi:10.1353/earl.0.0326. S2CID 170403332.
- Koester, Helmut (1990). Ancient Christian Gospels. Trinity Press International. ISBN 9780334024590. OCLC 21333973.
- Kim, David W. (2021). The Words of Jesus in the Gospel of Thomas: The Genesis of a Wisdom Tradition. Routledge. ISBN 9780367629229.
- Labib, Pahor (1956). Coptic Gnostic Papyri in the Coptic Museum at Old Cairo. Vol. I. Cairo Government Press. Plates 80, line 10–99, line 28.
- Layton, Bentley; Brakke, David (2021). The Gnostic Scriptures. Anchor Yale Bible Reference Library (2nd ed.). Yale University Press. ISBN 978-0-300-20854-2.
- Layton, Bentley, ed. (1989). Nag Hammadi Codex II,2–7 Together with XIII,2*, Brit. Lib. Or. 4926(1), and P. Oxy. 1, 654, 655. Nag Hammadi Studies 20. Brill. ISBN 978-90-04-43889-7. OCLC 18134527.
  - Layton, Bentley (1989). "Introduction". In Layton, Bentley (ed.). Nag Hammadi Codex II,2–7 Together with XIII,2*, Brit. Lib. Or. 4926(1), and P. Oxy. 1, 654, 655. Nag Hammadi Studies 20. Brill. pp. 1–18. ISBN 978-90-04-43889-7.
  - Attridge, Harold W. (1989). "The Gospel According to Thomas: Appendix: The Greek Fragments". In Layton, Bentley (ed.). Nag Hammadi Codex II,2–7 Together with XIII,2*, Brit. Lib. Or. 4926(1), and P. Oxy. 1, 654, 655. Nag Hammadi Studies 20. Brill. pp. 95–128. ISBN 978-90-04-43889-7.
  - Koester, Helmut (1989). "The Gospel According to Thomas: Introduction". In Layton, Bentley (ed.). Nag Hammadi Codex II,2–7 Together with XIII,2*, Brit. Lib. Or. 4926(1), and P. Oxy. 1, 654, 655. Nag Hammadi Studies 20. Brill. pp. 38–49. ISBN 978-90-04-43889-7.
- Luijendijk, AnneMarie (2011). "Reading the Gospel of Thomas in the Third Century: Three Oxyrhynchus Papyri and Origen's Homilies". In Clivaz, Claire; Zumstein, Jean (eds.). Reading New Testament Papyri in Context / Lire les papyrus du Nouveau Testament dans leur contexte. Bibliotheca Ephemeridum Theologicarum Lovaniensium 242. Peeters. pp. 241–267. ISBN 978-90-429-2506-9.
- Marjanen, Antti (2000). "Women Disciples in the Gospel of Thomas". In Uro, Risto (ed.). Thomas at the Crossroads: Essays on the Gospel of Thomas. Studies of the New Testament and Its World. Bloomsbury Publishing.
- Masing, Uku; Rätsep, Kaide (1961). "Barlaam and Joasaphat: Some problems connected with the story of Barlaam & Joasaphat, the Acts of Thomas, the Psalms of Thomas, and the Gospel of Thomas". Communio Viatorum. 4 (1): 29–36.
- McGrath, Alister E. (2006). Christian Theology. Wiley. ISBN 9781405153607. OCLC 70882125.
- Meier, John P. (1991). A Marginal Jew: Rethinking the Historical Jesus: Volume I: The Roots of the Problem and the Person. Doubleday. ISBN 0-385-26425-9.
- Meier, John P. (2016). A Marginal Jew: Rethinking the Historical Jesus: Volume V: Probing the Authenticity of the Parables. Yale University Press. ISBN 978-0-300-21647-9.
- Metzger, Bruce M. (1997). The Canon of the New Testament: Its Origin, Development, and Significance (Reprint ed.). Clarendon Press. ISBN 9780198261803. OCLC 14188714.
- Meyer, Marvin (2001). "Albert Schweitzer and the Image of Jesus in the Gospel of Thomas". In Meyer, Marvin; Hughes, Charles (eds.). Jesus Then & Now: Images of Jesus in History and Christology. Trinity Press International. ISBN 9781563383441. OCLC 44932109.
- Meyer, Marvin W., ed. (2013) [2007]. The Nag Hammadi Scriptures. HarperOne. ISBN 9780062046369.
  - Meyer, Marvin W.; Pagels, Elaine H. (2013) [2007]. "Introduction". In Meyer, Marvin W. (ed.). The Nag Hammadi Scriptures. HarperOne. ISBN 9780062046369.
  - Meyer, Marvin W. (2013) [2007]. "The Gospel of Thomas with the Greek Gospel of Thomas". In Meyer, Marvin W. (ed.). The Nag Hammadi Scriptures. HarperOne. ISBN 9780062046369.
- Pagels, Elaine (1979). The Gnostic Gospels. Vintage. ISBN 9780679724537. OCLC 915535931.
- Pagels, Elaine (2004). Beyond Belief: The Secret Gospel of Thomas. Vintage. ISBN 9780375703164. OCLC 55076968.
- Patterson, Stephen J. (1993). The Gospel of Thomas and Jesus: Thomas Christianity, Social Radicalism, and the Quest of the Historical Jesus. Foundations & Facets Reference Series. Polebridge Press. ISBN 0-944344-31-3.
- Patterson, Stephen J.; Robinson, James M.; Bethge, Hans-Gebhard (1998). The Fifth Gospel: The Gospel of Thomas Comes of Age. Trinity Press International. ISBN 9781563382499. OCLC 39747746.
- Perrin, Nicholas (2002). Thomas and Tatian: The Relationship between the Gospel of Thomas and the Diatessaron. Academia Biblica 5. Brill. ISBN 9789004127104. OCLC 50253053.
- Perrin, Nicholas (March 2006). "Thomas: The Fifth Gospel?". Journal of the Evangelical Theological Society. 49: 66–80.
- Riley, Gregory J. (1995). Resurrection Reconsidered: Thomas and John in Controversy. Fortress Press. ISBN 9780800628468. OCLC 31374903.
- Robinson, James M., ed. (1996). The Nag Hammadi Library in English (4th revised ed.). Brill. ISBN 978-90-04-08856-6.
  - Robinson, James M. (1996). "Introduction". In Robinson, James M. (ed.). The Nag Hammadi Library in English (4th revised ed.). Brill. pp. 1–26. ISBN 978-90-04-08856-6.
  - Koester, Helmut; Lambdin, Thomas O. (tr.) (1996). "The Gospel of Thomas". In Robinson, James MacConkey (ed.). The Nag Hammadi Library in English (4th revised ed.). Brill. pp. 124–138. ISBN 9789004088566. OCLC 36684919.
  - Parrott, Douglas M. (1996). "The Discourse on the Eighth and Ninth (VI,6)". In Robinson, James M. (ed.). The Nag Hammadi Library in English (4th revised ed.). Brill. pp. 321–327. ISBN 978-90-04-08856-6.
- Sellew, Melissa Harl (2018). "Reading Jesus in the Desert: The Gospel of Thomas Meets the Apophthegmata Patrum". In Jenott, Lance; Lundhaug, Hugo (eds.). The Nag Hammadi Codices and Late Antique Egypt. Studien und Texte zu Antike und Christentum 110. Mohr Siebeck. pp. 81–106.
- Sellew, Melissa Harl (2020). "Reading the Gospel of Thomas from Here: A Trans-Centred Hermeneutic". Journal for Interdisciplinary Biblical Studies. 1 (2): 61–96. doi:10.17613/4etz-b919.
- Shedinger, Robert F. (2003). "Thomas and Tatian: The Relationship between the Gospel of Thomas and the Diatessaron". Journal of Biblical Literature (Book review). 122 (2): 387–391. doi:10.2307/3268457. JSTOR 3268457.
- Skinner, Christopher W. (2009). John and Thomas – Gospels in Conflict?: Johannine Characterization and the Thomas Question. Princeton Theological Monograph Series 115. Pickwick Publications. ISBN 9781606086148. OCLC 365050716.
- Snodgrass, Klyne R. (1989). "The Gospel of Thomas: A Secondary Gospel". Second Century. 7 (1): 19–30.
- Strobel, Lee (2007). The Case for the Real Jesus. Zondervan. ISBN 9780310242109. OCLC 122526600.
- Theissen, Gerd; Merz, Annette (1998). The Historical Jesus: A Comprehensive Guide. Fortress Press. ISBN 9780800631239. OCLC 38590348.
- Tuckett, Christopher M. (1988). "Thomas and the Synoptics". Novum Testamentum. 30: 132–157. doi:10.1163/156853688X00217.
- Turner, John D. (tr.) (n.d.). "The Book of Thomas: NHC II,7, 138,4". The Gnostic Society Library.
- Uro, Risto (2003). Thomas: Seeking the Historical Context of the Gospel of Thomas. T&T Clark. ISBN 0-567-08329-2.
- Valantasis, Richard (1997). The Gospel of Thomas. Routledge. ISBN 9780415116213. OCLC 36008405.
- van den Broek, Roelof (2013). Gnostic Religion in Antiquity. Cambridge University Press.
- Van Voorst, Robert (2000). Jesus Outside the New Testament: An Introduction to the Ancient Evidence. Eerdmans. ISBN 9780802843685. OCLC 43286799.
- Williams, P. J. (2009). "Alleged Syriac Catchwords in the Gospel of Thomas". Vigiliae Christianae. 63 (1). Brill: 71–82. doi:10.1163/157007208X312743.
- Wright, N. T. (1992). The New Testament and the People of God. Fortress Press. ISBN 9780800626815. OCLC 27044029.
