= Nicholas Perrin =

American academic administrator and religious scholar

16th President of Trinity International University
- Preceded by: David Dockery
- Succeeded by: Kevin Kompelien

Personal details
- Born: September 5, 1964 (age 62) Boston, Massachusetts
- Spouse: Camie Brown
- Children: 2

Academic background
- Education: Johns Hopkins University (BA); Covenant Theological Seminary (M.Div.)
- Alma mater: Marquette University (Ph.D.)
- Thesis: Thomas and Tatian: The relationship between the 'Gospel of Thomas' and the 'Diatessaron' (2001)
- Doctoral advisor: Julian Hills

Academic work
- Institutions: Corinth Reformed Church

Nicholas Perrin is an American religious scholar and the Senior Pastor at Corinth Reformed Church in Hickory, North Carolina. Formerly, he served as an academic administrator who served as the 16th president of Trinity International University, a Christian university located in Deerfield, Illinois.

== Early life and education ==
Perrin earned a Bachelor of Arts in English literature from Johns Hopkins University and Master of Divinity from Covenant Theological Seminary. He then earned a Ph.D. in Biblical Studies from Marquette University.

== Career ==
Perrin previously served the Franklin S. Dyrness Professor of Biblical Studies at Wheaton College, Illinois. Where his work focused on the New Testament and early Christianity. Perrin has published on the Gospel of Thomas and proposed the theory that Thomas is dependent on Tatian's Diatessaron.

In addition to his writings on Christian origins and the Gnostic Gospels, Perrin has authored a number of popular lay introductions to works such as the Gospel of Judas and Gospel of Thomas. In 2007 Lost in Transmission was published as a response to Bart Ehrman's popular Misquoting Jesus dealing with issues of textual criticism of the New Testament.

In 2008 Perrin delivered a public lecture on the historical Jesus at the University of Georgia.

Perrin was announced as the 16th president of Trinity International University in 2019, succeeding David Dockery. Perrin tendered his resignation from presidency to the Board of Regents of the Trinity International University on February 15, 2024.

== Works ==
=== Books ===
- Perrin, Nicholas (2002). Thomas and Tatian: The Relationship between the Gospel of Thomas and the Diatessaron. Academia Biblica. Vol. 5. Atlanta, GA: Society of Biblical Literature.
- ——— (2006). The Judas Gospel. Downers Grove, IL: InterVarsity Press. ISBN 9780877840398. OCLC 85356223.
- ——— (2007). Lost in Transmission: What We Can Know about the Words of Jesus. Nashville, TN: Thomas Nelson. ISBN 9780849903670. OCLC 144598103.
- ——— (2007). Thomas: The Other Gospel. Louisville, KY: Westminster John Knox Press. ISBN 9780664232115. OCLC 137305724.
- ——— (2010). Jesus the Temple. Grand Rapids, MI: Baker Academic. ISBN 9780801045387. OCLC 669750917.
- ——— (2014). Finding Jesus in the Exodus: Christ in Israel's journey from slavery to the Promised Land. New York: Faith Words. ISBN 9781455560684. OCLC 879246081.
- ——— (2014). The Exodus Revealed: Israel's journey from slavery to the Promised Land. New York: Faith Words. ISBN 9781455560653. OCLC 879246093.
- ——— (2015). Jesus the Priest. Grand Rapids, MI: Baker Academic. ISBN 9780801048593. OCLC 892879493.

=== As editor ===
- ———; Goodacre, Mark, eds. (2004). Questioning Q: A Multidimensional Critique. Downers Grove, IL: Intervarsity. ISBN 9780830827695. OCLC 56614168.
- ———; Hays, Richard B., eds. (2011). Jesus, Paul, and the people of God: a theological dialogue with N.T. Wright. Downers Grove, IL: IVP Academic. ISBN 9780830838974. OCLC 666492764.
- ———; Green, Joel B.; Brown, Jeannine K., eds. (2013). Dictionary of Jesus and the Gospels. The IVP Bible dictionary series. Downers Grove, IL: InterVarsity Press. ISBN 9780830824564. OCLC 966860946.

=== Articles and chapters ===
- ——— (2004). "Some Implications of Dispensing with Q". In Perrin, Nicholas; Goodacre, Mark (eds.). Questioning Q: A Multidimensional Critique. Downers Grove, IL: Intervarsity. ISBN 9780830827695. OCLC 56614168.
- ——— (2007). "Recent Trends in Gospel of Thomas Research (1991-2006): Part I, The Historical Jesus and the Synoptic Gospels". Currents in Biblical Research. 5 (2): 183–206. doi:10.1177/1476993X06073807. S2CID 162340147.
- ——— (2007). "No Other Gospel". Christian History and Biography. 96: 27–30.
- ——— (December 2008). "Where to Begin with the Gospel of Mark?". Currents in Theology and Mission. 35: 413–419.
- ——— (2008). "The Aramaic Origins of the Gospel of Thomas – Revisited". In Frey, Jorg; Schröter, Jens; Popkes, Enno Edzard (eds.). Das Thomasevangelium: Entstehung -- Rezeption -- Theologie. Beihefte zur für Neutestamentliche Wissenschaft. Vol. 157. Berlin: Walter de Gruyter. pp. 50–59.
- ——— (2008). "Eschatological Aspects of the Sinai Experience in Patristic Interpretation". In Kenneth E., Kenneth E. (ed.). Israel in the Wilderness: Interpretations of the Biblical Narratives in Jewish and Christian Traditions. Themes in Biblical Narrative. Vol. 10. Leiden: Brill. pp. 173–182. ISBN 9789004164246.
- ——— (2009). "The Diatessaron and the Second-Century Reception of the Gospel of John". In Rasimus, Tuomas (ed.). The Legacy of John: The Second Century Reception of the Fourth Gospel. Novum Testamentum, Supplements. Vol. 132. Leiden: Brill. pp. 301–318. ISBN 9789047429777.
- ——— (2011). "Jesus' Eschatology and Kingdom Ethics: ever the twain shall meet". In ———; Hays, Richard B. (eds.). Jesus, Paul, and the people of God: a theological dialogue with N.T. Wright. Downers Grove, IL: IVP Academic. ISBN 9780830838974. OCLC 666492764.
- ——— (2016). "Managing Jesus' Anger: Revisiting a Text-Critical Conundrum (Mark 1:41)". Criswell Theological Review. 13: 3–16.
- ——— (2017). "Habakkuk, Paul, and the End of Empire: A Fresh Perspective on Romans 13:1-7". In Dow, L. K. Fuller; Evans, Craig A.; Pitts, A. (eds.). The Language and Literature of the New Testament: Essays in Honor of Stanley E. Porter's 60th Birthday. Leiden: Brill. pp. 536–54.
- ——— (2018). "New Exodus Traditions in Earliest Christianity". In Porter, Stanley E.; Pitts, A. (eds.). Christian Origins and the Establishment of the Early Jesus Movement. ECHC. Vol. 4. Leiden: Brill. pp. 335–50.
- ——— (2018). "Jesus as Priest in the Gospels". Southern Baptist Journal of Theology. 22: 81–98.

=== Training course ===
- ——— (2016). BI301 A Biblical Theology of the Kingdom of God (9 hour course). Logos Mobile Education. Bellingham, WA: Lexham Press.
