= Victor of Capua =

Sixth-century bishop of Capua

Saint Victor of Capua
- Died: 554
- Venerated in: Catholic Church
- Feast: October 17

Victor of Capua (Latin: Victor Capuanus, died 554) was a sixth-century bishop of Capua in Italy.

== Biography ==
Very little is known about Victor's life. He became bishop of Capua in February 541 and held the position until his death in April 554. His feast in the Roman Martyrology is on 17 October.

== Works ==
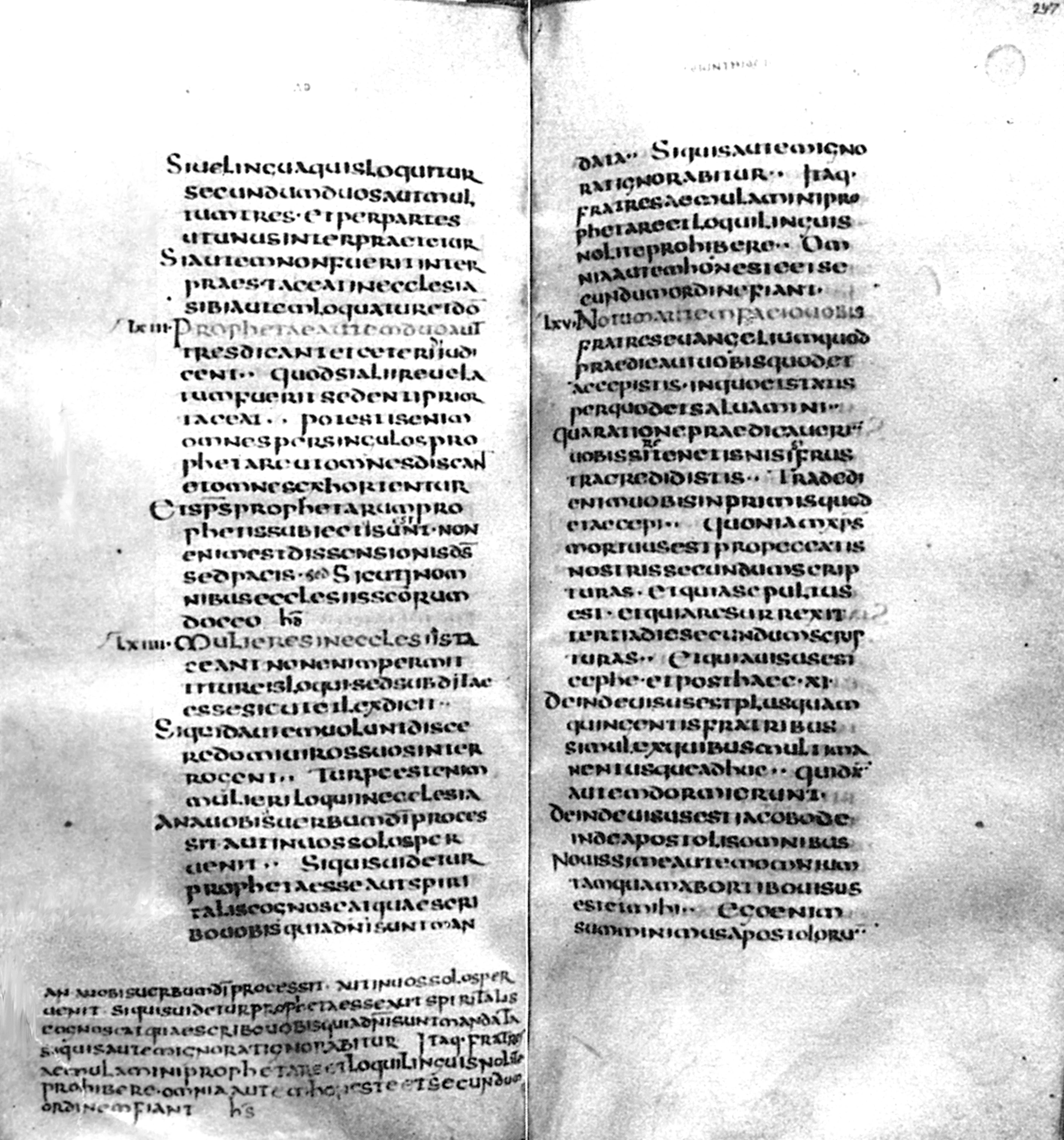
Pages 296–297 of the Codex Fuldensis

Victor's best known work is the Codex Fuldensis, which was written between 541 and 546 while he was bishop of Capua. The codex is an early manuscript of the Vulgate, and it contains the entirety of the New Testament as well as the apocryphal Epistle to the Laodiceans in a style imitative of Tatian's Diatessaron.

Other works include several commentaries on the Old and New Testament as well and a work on the Paschal Cycle which was praised and quoted in fragments by Bede. Victor also authored analyses of the genealogy of Jesus and Noah's Ark, all of which are lost.

He dedicated a codification of the order of pericopes in a lectionary was dedicated to Constantius of Aquino.
