= April DeConick =

American theologian

April D. DeConick is the Isla Carroll and Percy E. Turner Professor of New Testament and Early Christianity at Rice University in Houston, Texas. She came to Rice University as a full professor in 2006, after receiving tenure at Illinois Wesleyan University in 2004. DeConick is the author of several books in the field of Early Christian Studies and is best known for her work on the Gospel of Thomas and ancient Gnosticism.

== Early life and education ==
DeConick received her PhD in Near Eastern Studies at the University of Michigan in 1993. Her doctoral work was focused on rereading the Gospel of Thomas as a text that was composed by early second century Christians who were mystics associated with the Jewish Christian tradition from Jerusalem. It was supervised by Jarl Fossum with Gilles Quispel as her dissertation examiner. DeConick's work on the Gospel of Thomas as an early Christian text from Syrian Christianity had a big impact on the field, rethinking the text as a reflection of very early orthodox mysticism rather than Gnosticism.

== Academic career ==
DeConick is a historian of early Jewish and Christian thought. Her work focuses on New Testament and pre-Nicene literature, non-canonical gospels, gnostic literature and movements, mysticism and esotericism in early Christianity, new religious movements past and present, the biosocial study of religion, and a theoretical point of view called post-constructivism. She is known also for her original work on the Gospel of Judas, a Coptic Gnostic gospel rediscovered in 2006. Her work has been called "revisionist," challenging to seek answers beyond the conventional. When National Geographic released the first English translation of the Gospel of Judas, a second-century text discovered in Egypt in the 1970s, DeConick was the first scholar who seriously challenged the National Geographic "official" interpretation of a good Judas. She contended that the Gospel of Judas is not about a “good” Judas. Rather it represents a gospel parody about a “demon” Judas written by a particular group of Gnostic Christians known as the Sethians. DeConick published her criticisms in the New York Times and in her book called The Thirteenth Apostle: What the Gospel of Judas Really Says. She was featured in CNN's documentary on the Gospel of Judas that premiered in 2015 on the TV series "Finding Jesus.”
DeConick is the founder and executive editor of Gnosis: Journal of Gnostic Studies (Leiden: Brill) and a recruiting editor for the monograph series Nag Hammadi and Manichaean Studies (Leiden: Brill). She is active in the Society of Biblical Literature as the founding chair of the “Mysticism, Esotericism and Gnosticism in Antiquity Section,” and the past-chair of the Committee for the Status of Women in the Profession. DeConick also organized and chaired for many years the Early Jewish and Christian Mysticism Group. She is also affiliated with the North American Patristics Society, and the International Association for Coptic Studies.

== Honors ==
DeConick's book, The Gnostic New Age: How a Countercultural Spirituality Revolutionized Religion from Antiquity to Today, published by Columbia University Press in 2016, won the Figure Foundation Award for the best book published by a university press in philosophy and religion.

== Selected works ==
=== Articles ===
- Mysticism Before Mysticism: Teaching Christian Mysticism as a Historian of Religion (in Teaching Mysticism, (2011): 26-45.
- The Great Mystery of Marriage: Sex and Conception in Ancient Valentinian Traditions (Vigiliae Christianae 57, no. 3 (2003): 307-42.)
- The True Mysteries: Sacramentalism in the Gospel of Philip (Vigiliae Christianae 55, no. 3 (2001): 225-61.

=== Books ===
- The Gnostic New Age: How a Countercultural Spirituality Revolutionized Religion From Antiquity to Today (Columbia University Press, 2016)
- Holy Misogyny: Why the Sex and Gender Conflicts in the Early Church Still Matter (London: Continuum, 2011)
- The Thirteenth Apostle: What the Gospel of Judas Really Says (London: Continuum, 2007)
- The Original Gospel of Thomas in Translation: With a Commentary and New English Translation of the Complete Gospel (T&T Clark, 2007)
- Recovering the Original Gospel of Thomas: A History of the Gospel and its Growth(T&T Clark, 2006)
- Paradise Now: Essays on Early Jewish and Christian Mysticism (Edited; Society of Biblical Literature, 2006)
- Thomasine Traditions in Antiquity: The Social and Cultural World of the Gospel of Thomas (Co-editor; Brill, 2005)
- Voices of the Mystics: Early Christian Discourse in the Gospels of John, Thomas and Other Ancient Christian Literature (T&T Clark, 2001)
- Seek to See Him: Ascent and Vision Mysticism in the Gospel of Thomas (Brill, 1996)
