= Thomas Oden Lambdin =

American linguist (1927–2020)

- Born: October 31, 1927; Frederick, Maryland
- Died: May 8, 2020 (aged 92); Manchester, New Hampshire
- Education: Franklin & Marshall College; Johns Hopkins University (Ph.D., 1952)
- Occupations: Linguist, Scholar
- Organizations: Johns Hopkins University; Harvard University
- Known for: Research and teaching in Semitic and Egyptian languages; textbooks on Biblical Hebrew, Coptic, Ge'ez, Gothic
- Notable work: Introduction to Biblical Hebrew

Thomas Oden Lambdin (October 31, 1927 – May 8, 2020) was an American linguist and scholar of the Semitic and Egyptian languages.

== Early life and education ==
Lambdin was born on October 31, 1927 in Frederick, Maryland. Following his service in the U.S. Army and his deployment in Guam, Lambdin earned his Bachelor of Arts degree from Franklin and Marshall College in 1948. He received his Ph.D. in 1952 from the Johns Hopkins University Department of Near Eastern Studies, where his advisor was William Foxwell Albright; his dissertation was on "Egyptian Loanwords and Transcriptions in the Ancient Semitic Languages."

== Career ==
After earning his doctorate, Lambdin remained at Johns Hopkins University for eight years. In 1960, he joined Harvard University, and was appointed as an associate professor of Semitic Languages at Harvard in 1964. He retired from Harvard in 1983 and served as Professor Emeritus until his death.

He was admired not only for his research and his "tireless teaching", but for the quality of his introductory textbooks on Biblical Hebrew, Coptic, Ge'ez and Gothic language. The Festschrift published in his honor, Working with No Data: Semitic and Egyptian Studies Presented to Thomas O. Lambdin includes a full bibliography of his publications, as well as chapters by John Huehnergard and Richard J. Clifford about their experiences as his students.

Lambdin’s teaching was noted for its scope and intensity; at one point he taught year-long courses in five ancient languages simultaneously. At the same time, his textbooks have been praised for their clarity and pedagogical value. His scholarship also extended to translation work, notably the Coptic Gospel of Thomas in The Nag Hammadi library.

== Death ==
Lambdin died at his home in Manchester, New Hampshire, on May 8, 2020, at the age of 92.

== Works ==
- Lambdin, Thomas O. (1958). "The Bivalence of Coptic Eta and Related Problems in the Vocalization of Egyptian". Journal of Near Eastern Studies. 17 (3): 177–93. doi:10.1086/371466. S2CID 161100821.
- Thomas O. Lambdin. (1971). Introduction to Biblical Hebrew. London: Darton, Longman and Todd Ltd. ISBN 978-0-232-51369-1.
- Thomas O. Lambdin (1978). Introduction to Classical Ethiopic. Harvard Semitic Studies 24. Missoula, MT: Scholars Press. ISBN 0-89130-263-8.
- Thomas O. Lambdin (1983). Introduction to Sahidic Coptic. Macon, GA: Mercer University Press.
- Thomas O. Lambdin (2006). Introduction to the Gothic Language. Ancient Language Resources. Eugene, OR: Wipf & Stock.
