= Parable of the Wicked Husbandmen =

Parable taught by Jesus

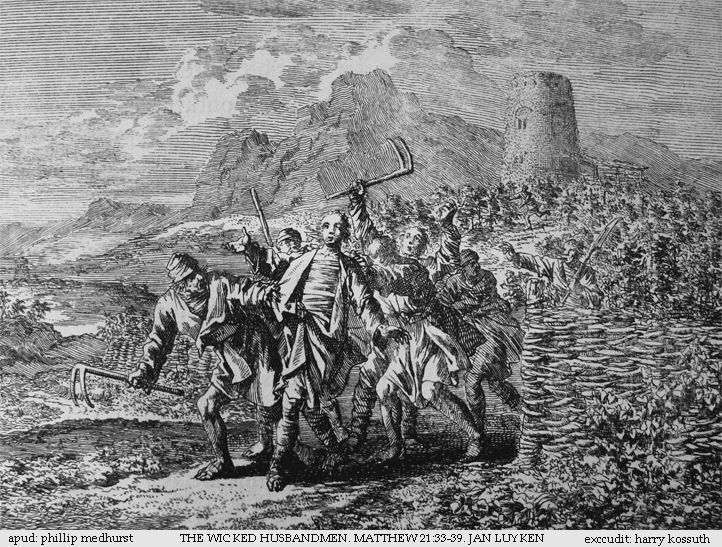
The Wicked Husbandmen from the Bowyer Bible, 19th century

The Parable of the Wicked Husbandmen, also known as the Parable of the Bad Tenants, is a parable of Jesus found in the Gospel of Matthew (Matthew 21:33–46), the Gospel of Mark (Mark 12:1–12) and the Gospel of Luke (Luke 20:9–19). It is also found in the non-canonical Gospel of Thomas. It describes a landowner (KJV: householder) planting a vineyard and letting it out to husbandmen (tenants in some translations) who failed in their duties.

A common Christian interpretation is that this parable was about the chief priests and Pharisees, and was given to the people present within the Temple in Jerusalem during the final week before the death of Jesus.

== The parable ==
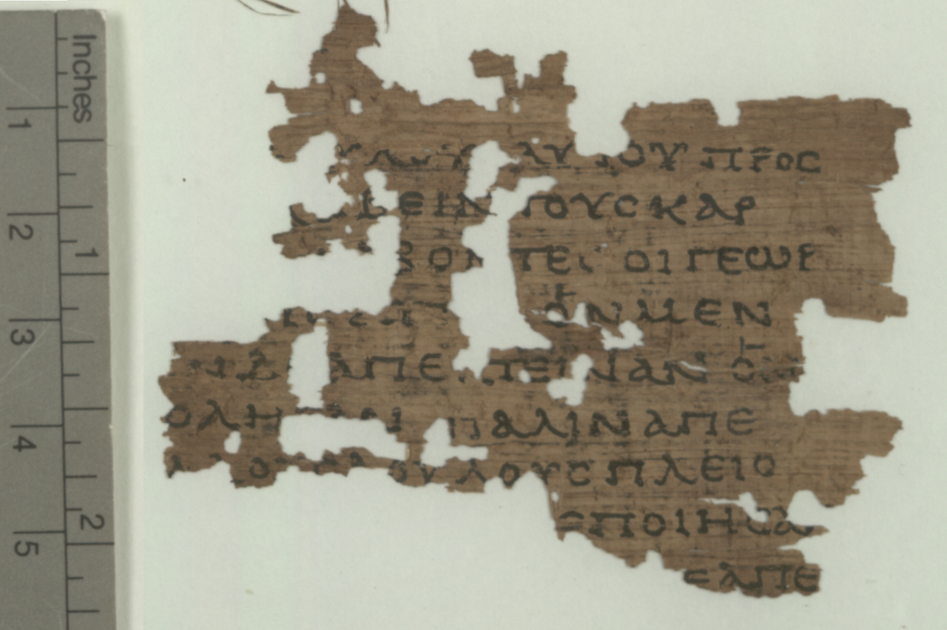
Part of the Greek text on Papyrus 104 (2nd century AD)

33 Hear another parable: There was a certain householder, which planted a vineyard, and hedged it round about, and digged a winepress in it, and built a tower, and let it out to husbandmen, and went into a far country:

34 And when the time of the fruit drew near, he sent his servants to the husbandmen, that they might receive the fruits of it.

35 And the husbandmen took his servants, and beat one, and killed another, and stoned another.

36 Again, he sent other servants more than the first: and they did unto them likewise.

37 But last of all he sent unto them his son, saying, They will reverence my son.

38 But when the husbandmen saw the son, they said among themselves, This is the heir; come, let us kill him, and let us seize on his inheritance.

39 And they caught him, and cast him out of the vineyard, and slew him.

40 When the lord therefore of the vineyard cometh, what will he do unto those husbandmen?

41 They say unto him, He will miserably destroy those wicked men, and will let out his vineyard unto other husbandmen, which shall render him the fruits in their seasons.

42 Jesus saith unto them, Did ye never read in the scriptures, The stone which the builders rejected, the same is become the head of the corner: this is the Lord's doing, and it is marvellous in our eyes?

43 Therefore say I unto you, The kingdom of God shall be taken from you, and given to a nation bringing forth the fruits thereof.

44 And whosoever shall fall on this stone shall be broken: but on whomsoever it shall fall, it will grind him to powder.

45 And when the chief priests and Pharisees had heard his parables, they perceived that he spake of them.

46 But when they sought to lay hands on him, they feared the multitude, because they took him for a prophet. – Matthew 21:33–46] (King James Version)

== Source tradition ==
The parable, according to Marcan priority, probably appeared first in Mark, then was copied and slightly altered by Matthew and Luke. Mark's source is in dispute, with the earliest tradition given by Papias as Mark's source being Peter. It is also found in the Gospel of Thomas as sayings 65–66, which some have suggested preceded the canonical Gospels, although its dating is still largely uncertain to scholars.

== Interpretation ==
Here is the version of this parable that appears in Thomas (Patterson–Meyer Translation):

65. He said, "A ... person owned a vineyard and rented it to some farmers, so they could work it and he could collect its crop from them. He sent his slave so the farmers would give him the vineyard's crop. They grabbed him, beat him, and almost killed him, and the slave returned and told his master. His master said, 'Perhaps he didn't know them.' He sent another slave, and the farmers beat that one as well. Then the master sent his son and said, 'Perhaps they'll show my son some respect.' Because the farmers knew that he was the heir to the vineyard, they grabbed him and killed him. Anyone here with two ears had better listen!"

66. Jesus said, "Show me the stone that the builders rejected: that is the keystone."

Verse 66 is a quote from Psalm 118:22–23. Many writers of the New Testament used this Psalm to sum up their understanding of Jesus' death as part of his role as the messiah. It is notable that the Hebrew word for son, ben, is almost the same as stone, 'eben, which might be what generated seeing Jesus as a stone. Since the synoptics state Jesus said this in the Temple, this could reflect their view of Jesus as replacing the function of the Temple, bringing God's presence to humanity.

This could be seen as referring to the new Church's belief that they had superseded Judaism through Jesus' death, resurrection and role as the messiah. Others think it might be a reference to the Roman destruction of Jerusalem as seen by Christians as God's punishment for Jesus' death and their assumption that their new communities were the new Temple.

Seeing Jesus as a "stone" to build on precedes Jerusalem's destruction, however. Paul, in his letter to the Romans chapter 9:33, refers to Jesus as a stone. Paul does not use the Psalms for his scriptural support but instead uses quotes from Isaiah 8:14 and 28:16. Luke stated, probably after Jerusalem's destruction, in Acts of the Apostles 4:11 that Peter used the same Psalm to describe Jesus shortly after Jesus' death. 1 Peter, which most scholars consider pseudepigraphal, uses both Isaiah and the Psalm as references in 2:6–8.

Matthew's version states the method of killing the third servant, stoning, which the other versions lack. Stoning might be a reference to Christian martyrs' deaths, perhaps the death of James the Just. Matthew also has the priests and leaders say that the husbandmen should be killed.

Irenaeus used this parable to defend the link between Judaism's God and Jesus, in his Adversus Haereses. If one sees the servants as the Jewish prophets, then the owner who sent them must then be the same father of the son in the story, who are God the Father and Jesus, so the God of the Jews must also be Jesus' father.

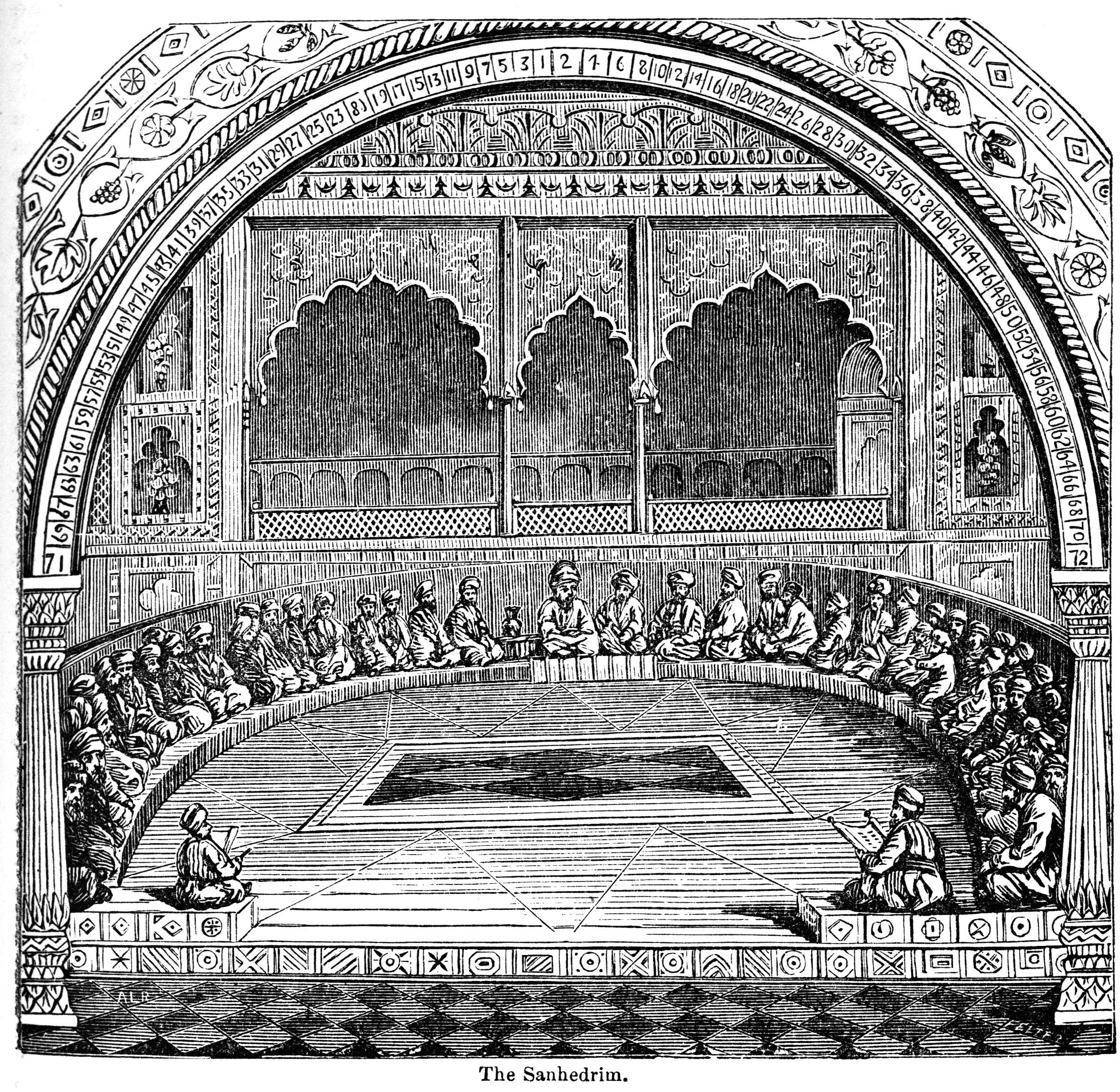
The Sanhedrin in the Temple in Jerusalem

All the synoptic versions of the parable state that the priests of the Sanhedrin understood that Jesus' parable was directed against them, and thus that they are the husbandmen. The term husbandman is translated as tenant or farmer in the New International Version and as vine-grower in the New American Standard Bible. Workers often tended absentee estates and if the owner had no heirs the workers would have the first right to the land. The tower and the winepress have been interpreted as "sanctuary" and "altar", respectively.

The description of the vineyard reflects the opening verses of Isaiah 5. Using a vineyard as a metaphor to describe Israel was a common practice for religious discourse at the time. It could also be God's covenant, or perhaps the world itself. The produce made at the vineyard might be a metaphor for all the good produced by the people, which the authorities are not sharing with God, and trying to keep for themselves.

The owner of the vineyard is God and the son is Jesus. The traditional interpretation about the owner leaving the vineyard is expressed by Erasmus to argue that God leaving humans the free will to act, as is said by Bede the Venerable: "He seems to leave the vineyard so as to leave the keepers of the vineyard free choice of action."

A common interpretation of the servants is that of the Jewish prophets, although they could be all of God's preceding messengers. The meaning of the "others" who will be given the vineyard is debated. Some proposed interpretations have seen them as other Jews, Gentiles (generally), Christians, or maybe even the Jewish Christians. They are usually seen as the new Christian community.

=== The possibility of tenants as greedy commercial farmers vs. poor farmers ===
Craig Evans surveys the use of "tenant" (γεωργοὶ cf. Matt 21:38) in lease agreements in antiquity to contextualize how these tenants should be viewed. He concludes that:

Interpreters should not assume that these farmers would necessarily have been understood as poor sharecroppers who out of desperation for land resorted to theft and murder. The farmers who entered into a legal agreement with the owner of the vineyard could very well have been understood by Jesus’ hearers as commercial farmers hungry for profits. Hence, their equation with the ruling priests would have been readily perceived. There is no reason to assume that the γεωργοὶ would necessarily have been understood as impoverished or marginalized. Their high-handed actions against the servants and son of the owner parallel Jeddous’ rough treatment of the emissaries of Zenon’s associate, while the owner’s military response parallels the action taken against the Senators of Salamis. These parallels from history are consistent with an interpretation of the parable that identifies the tenant farmers as the ruling priests.

— Evans (1996)

== See also ==
- Life of Jesus in the New Testament
- Luke 20
- Mark 12
- Matthew 21
- Ministry of Jesus
