= Papyrus Oxyrhynchus 5575 =

Greek papyrus fragment

Papyrus Oxyrhynchus 5575 (abbreviated as P. Oxy. 5575) is a second century papyrus fragment written in Greek containing quotes that appear to parallel multiple Gospels: Matthew, Luke, and Thomas. It contains the oldest extant quote that reflects material associated with the Gospel of Thomas and comes from the era of Early Christianity before the finalization of the New Testament canon. The papyrus fragment was published as part of Oxyrhynchus Papyri LXXXVII by the Egypt Exploration Society on August 31, 2023, after over a decade of study.

== Contents ==
The first words on the recto side may be part of Thomas 63:1–3 (similar to Luke 12:16–21), which is followed by a saying similar to Luke 12:22/Matt 6:25a (lines 1–5). Next is a saying similar to Thomas 27 (lines 6–10), and text similar to Luke 12:24/Matt 6:25b–26 (lines 11–14). On the verso side are words that appear to belong to Luke 12:27–28, 30b–31/Matt 6:28b–30, 32b–33, but with variants.

Papyrus Oxyrhynchus 5575
Recto (→)	Verso (↑)
... he died (?). [I tell] you: [do not] worry [about] your [life,] what you will eat, [or] about the body, what [you will wear.] For I tell you: [unless] you fast [from the world,] you will never find [the Kingdom,] and unless you ... the world, you [will never ...] the Father ... the birds, how ... and [your (?)] heavenly Father [feeds them (?).] You therefore ...	[Consider the lilies,] how they grow ... Solomon ... in [his] glory ... [if] the Father [clothes] grass which dries up and is thrown into the oven, [he will clothe (?)] you ... You [also (?)] therefore ... for [your] Father [knows what (?)] ... need you have. [Instead (?)] seek [his kingdom (?),] and [all these things (?)] will be given [to you (?)] ...

== See also ==
- Oxyrhynchus Papyri
- Gospel of Thomas
