= Stevan Davies =

Stevan L. Davies
- Born: 1948 (age 76–77); United States

Stevan L. Davies (born 1948) is an author and Emeritus Professor of Religious Studies at Misericordia University in Dallas, Pennsylvania. His most notable work has been in the analysis of Christian apocrypha, especially the Gospel of Thomas. He is married to Sally Watkins Davies and has two children, Michael L. Davies and Meredith G. Russell.

Davies holds a bachelor's degree from Duke University and a doctorate in philosophy from Temple University.

He was Professor of Religious Studies at Misericordia University from 1979 to 2015.

== Published works ==
=== Books ===
- Spirit Possession and the Origins of Christianity, Bardic Press, 2014
- The New Testament: An Analytical Approach, Polebridge Press, 2011
- The Infancy Gospels of Jesus Annotated & Explained: Apocryphal Tales from the Childhoods of Mary and Jesus, Skylight-Paths Press, 2009
- The Secret Book of John Annotated and Explained: The Gnostic Gospel, Skylight-Paths Press, 2005
- The Gospel of Thomas Annotated and Explained, Skylight-Paths Press, 2002 (Hardback edition: Shambala Press, 2004)
- Jesus the Healer: Possession, Trance, and the Origins of Christianity, Continuum Press, 1995
- The Gospel of Thomas and Christian Wisdom, Seabury/Harper and Row, 1983
- The Revolt of the Widows: The Social World of the Apocryphal Acts, Southern Illinois University Press, 1980

=== Book chapters ===
- “But I Say Unto You: ‘Who Is Elias?’” in: New Directions in Mormon Studies edited by Eric Mason and Quincy Newell, University of Illinois Press, 2013
- “The Gospel of Thomas,” in The Oxford Encyclopedia of the Books of the Bible, Oxford University Press, 2011.
- “The Gospel of Thomas,” in Eerdman's Dictionary of the Bible, edited by David Noel Freedman, Eerdmans, 2000
- “Women in the Third Gospel and the New Testament Apocrypha,” in Women Like This: New Perspectives on Jewish Women in the Greco-Roman World, edited by Amy-Jill Levine, Scholars Press, 1991

=== Articles ===
- "The Popul Vuh’s Myth of the Origin of Shamans," Community College Humanities Review, Volume 28, Fall 2008
- “Mark’s Use of the Gospel of Thomas," Neotestamentica, Vol. 30 No. 2 1996
- “The Christology and Protology of the Gospel of Thomas,” Journal of Biblical Literature, Vol. III No. 4, 1992
- '“Women, Tertullian and the Acts of Paul,” Semeia, 1986
- “John the Baptist and Essene Kashruth,” New Testament Studies, Vol. 29 No 4, 1983
- “The Lion Headed Yaldabaoth,” Journal of Religious History, Vol 11, No 4, 1981
- “Who is Called Barabbas?” New Testament Studies, Vol 27 No 1,1981
- “The Predicament of Ignatius of Antioch,” Vigiliae Christianae, Vol 30, 1976

=== Television appearances ===
- History Channel: contributor on Gnosticism – “The Real Face of Jesus”, 2010
- British Broadcasting Corporation: (Discovery Channel in USA); Miracles of Jesus Series: “Jesus’ Miracles of Healing” 2005
- National Geographic Channel - Science of the Bible Series: “Jesus as Healer” 2005
- British Broadcasting Corporation: (Discovery Channel in USA) - Ancient Evidence Series: “The Real Disciples of Jesus.” 2004
- British Broadcasting Corporation: (Discovery Channel in USA) - Ancient Evidence Series: “The Real Mary Magdalene.” 2004
- Arts and Entertainment Network production, on-camera contributor regarding the New Testament for the Biography Series program: “The Biography of Satan” 1998
