= Simon J. Gathercole =

British biblical scholar (born 1974)

Simon Gathercole
- Born: 8 July 1974 (age 52)
- Occupation: New Testament scholar
- Title: Professor of New Testament and Early Christianity at Fitzwilliam College, Cambridge

Academic background
- Education: University of Durham
- Thesis: After the New Perspective: works, justification and boasting in early Judaism and Romans 1-5 (2001)
- Doctoral advisor: James D.G. Dunn

Academic work
- Institutions: Cambridge University

Simon James Gathercole (born 8 July 1974) is a United Kingdom New Testament scholar, Professor of New Testament and Early Christianity, and Director of Studies at Fitzwilliam College, Cambridge.

== Biography ==
Gathercole completed a degree in Classics and Theology at Cambridge and then pursued doctoral research at Durham University under the supervision of James D. G. Dunn, with funding from the Arts and Humanities Research Council, the German Academic Exchange Service and Hatfield College. He also studied for short periods at the University of Tübingen and the Jewish Theological Seminary, New York. He was formerly Senior Lecturer in New Testament at the University of Aberdeen.

Drawn from his dissertation, his book Where is Boasting? (2002) was a critique of the New Perspective on Paul, and focused on Second-Temple Judaism and Romans 1-5.

Since 2007, Gathercole has served as editor of the Journal for the Study of the New Testament.

== Works ==
=== Thesis ===
- Gathercole, Simon J. (2001). After the New Perspective: works, justification and boasting in early Judaism and Romans 1-5 (Ph.D.). Durham, UK: Durham University.

=== Books ===
- Gathercole, Simon J. (2002). Where is Boasting: Early Jewish Soteriology and Paul's Response in Romans 1-5. Grand Rapids, MI: Eerdmans. ISBN 9780802839916. OCLC 50270358.
- ——— (2006). The Pre-existent Son: Recovering the Christologies of Matthew, Mark, And Luke. Grand Rapids, MI: Eerdmans. ISBN 9780802829016. OCLC 68786800.
- ———; Barclay, John M. G. (2006). Divine and human agency in Paul and his cultural environment. Library of New Testament studies. Vol. 335. London & New York: T & T Clark. ISBN 9780567084538. OCLC 78988350.
- ——— (2007). The Gospel of Judas: Rewriting Early Christianity. Oxford & New York: Oxford University Press. ISBN 9780191527531. OCLC 191028046.
- ——— (2012). The Composition of the Gospel of Thomas : original language and influences. Society for New Testament Studies: Monograph series. Vol. 151. Cambridge & New York: Cambridge University Press. ISBN 9781107009042. OCLC 753630580.
- ——— (2014). The Gospel of Thomas: introduction and commentary. Texts and editions for New Testament study. Vol. 11. Leiden & Boston: Brill. ISBN 9789004190412. OCLC 872222206.
- ——— (2015). Defending substitution : an essay on atonement in Paul. Acadia studies in Bible and theology. Grand Rapids, MI: Baker Academic. ISBN 9780801049774. OCLC 881440386.
- The Apocryphal Gospels (2021). Penguin Classics. ISBN 9780241340554
- ——— (2022). The Gospel and the Gospels. Grand Rapids, MI: Eerdmans. ISBN 978-0802877598. OCLC 1294289382.

=== As editor ===
- ———; Weeks, Stuart; Stuckenbruck, Loren T., eds. (2004). The Book of Tobit: texts from the principal ancient and medieval traditions: with synopsis, concordances, and annotated texts in Aramaic, Hebrew, Greek, Latin, and Syriac. Fontes et subsidia ad Bibliam pertinentes. Vol. 3. Berlin & New York: Walter de Gruyter. ISBN 9783110897029. OCLC 865508180.
- ———; Alexander, T. Desmond, eds. (2004). Heaven on Earth. Carlisle, UK: Paternoster Press. ISBN 9781842272725. OCLC 57403727.

=== Articles and chapters ===
- ——— (Winter 2003). "Romans 1-5 and the "weak" and the "strong": Pauline theology, pastoral rhetoric, and the purpose of Romans". Review & Expositor. 100 (1): 35–51. doi:10.1177/003463730310000103. S2CID 145656633.
- ——— (January 2012). "The Earliest Manuscript Title of Matthew's Gospel (BnF Suppl. gr. 1120 ii 3 / 𝔓4)". Novum Testamentum. 54 (3): 209–235. doi:10.1163/156853612X650084. S2CID 170993197.
- ——— (October 2018). "The Alleged Anonymity of the Canonical Gospels". The Journal of Theological Studies. 69 (2): 447–476. doi:10.1093/jts/fly113. S2CID 159837819.
