= Helmut Koester =

American scholar of the New Testament and early Christianity (1926–2016)

Helmut Heinrich Koester
- Born: December 18, 1926; Hamburg, Weimar Germany
- Died: January 1, 2016 (aged 89); Massachusetts, United States
- Occupations: Scholar of the New Testament and Early Christianity
- Spouse: Gisela Harrassowitz

Academic background
- Education: University of Marburg, Germany
- Thesis: Synoptic Tradition in the Apostolic Fathers (1954)

Academic work
- Institutions: Harvard Divinity School
- Notable works: Introduction to the New Testament (in two volumes)

Helmut Heinrich Koester (December 18, 1926 – January 1, 2016) was an American scholar who specialized in the New Testament and early Christianity at Harvard Divinity School. His research was primarily in the areas of New Testament interpretation, history of early Christianity, and archaeology of the early Christian period.

== Life ==
Koester was born in Hamburg, Germany. He served in the Wehrmacht Navy from 1943–1945 and was released from a POW camp in 1945 and studied under Rudolf Bultmann at the University of Marburg. He submitted his dissertation in 1954 and then became an assistant to Günther Bornkamm at the University of Heidelberg from 1954-1956. Koester began teaching at Harvard Divinity School in 1958 and became John H. Morison Research Professor of Divinity and Winn Research Professor of Ecclesiastical History in 2000. Koester was co-editor and chair of the New Testament editorial board of the commentary series "Hermeneia: A Critical and Historical Commentary on the Bible" published by Fortress Press (Minneapolis). He served as the president of the Society of Biblical Literature (1991), was member of the Studiorum Novi Testamenti Societas (SNTS) and was elected a Fellow of the American Academy of Arts and Sciences.

Koester was an ordained minister of the Lutheran Church. In 1953, he married Gisela Harrassowitz, with whom he had four children, named Reinhild, Almut, Ulrich, and Heiko. He had three grandchildren including Christopher, Lukas, and Alexander. He died on January 1, 2016, at the age of 89.

== Work ==
In his dissertation (published as Synoptische Überlieferung bei den Apostolischen Vätern, i.e. "Synoptic Tradition in the Apostolic Fathers"), Koester was able to demonstrate that much material in the so-called Apostolic Fathers that parallels elements in the Synoptic Gospels need not necessarily reflect dependence upon the written form of the Synoptics known to us. This was an extremely significant observation, and one with which all subsequent scholarship on early Christian gospel traditions would have to reckon. Among his numerous subsequent publications, his two-volume Introduction to the New Testament has become a standard reference work. Koester views the narratives of Jesus' virgin birth as having roots in Hellenistic mythology.

== Select works ==
=== Books ===
- ——— (1957). Synoptische Überlieferung bei den Apostolischen Vätern. TU. Vol. 65. Berlin: Akademie Verlag.
- ———; Robinson, James M. (1971). Trajectories through Early Christianity. Philadelphia, PA: Fortress. ISBN 9780800600587. OCLC 153829.
- ——— (1982). History, Culture, and Religion of the Hellenistic Age. Introduction to the New Testament. Vol. 1. New York: De Gruyter. ISBN 9783110814064. OCLC 857587519.
- ——— (1982). Introduction to the New Testament. Hermeneia: foundations and facets. Vol. 1. Minneapolis, MS: Fortress Press. ISBN 9780800621001. OCLC 8669669.
- ——— (1982). Introduction to the New Testament. Hermeneia: foundations and facets. Vol. 2. Minneapolis, MS: Fortress Press. ISBN 9780800621018. OCLC 8669669.
- ——— (1985). History and Literature of Early Christianity. Introduction to the New Testament. Vol. 2. New York: De Gruyter. ISBN 9783110812657. OCLC 979906796.
- ——— (1990). Ancient Christian Gospels. Harrisburg: Trinity Press International. ISBN 0334024501.
- ——— (2007). Paul & His World: Interpreting the New Testament in its Context. Minneapolis, MS: Fortress Press. ISBN 9780800638900. OCLC 71004165.
- ——— (2007). From Jesus to the Gospels: Interpreting the New Testament in its Context. Minneapolis, MS: Fortress Press. ISBN 9780800620936. OCLC 86117504.

=== Edited by ===
———, ed. (1995). Ephesos Metropolis of Asia: an interdisciplinary approach to its archaeology, religion, and culture. Harvard Theological Studies. Vol. 41. Valley Forge, PA: Trinity Press International. ISBN 9781563381560. OCLC 33133132.

== Sources ==
- Pearson, Birger A., ed. (1991). The Future of Early Christianity: essays in honor of Helmut Koester. Minneapolis, MS: Fortress Press. ISBN 9780800625214. OCLC 24378104.
- Smith, James D. III; Sellew, Philip H., eds. (2007). The Fabric of Early Christianity: Reflections in Honor of Helmut Koester by Fifty Years of Harvard Students, Presented on the Occasion of His 80th Birthday. Eugene, OR: Pickwick Publications. ISBN 9781597529747. OCLC 77498445.
