= Robert F. Shedinger =

American Professor of Religion

- Born: 23 November 1959 (age 66)

Academic background
- Education: Temple University; Eastern Baptist Theological Seminary
- Thesis: Tatian and the Jewish Scriptures

Academic work
- Discipline: religious studies
- Institutions: Luther College

Robert Frederick Shedinger (born 23 November 1959) is an American Professor of Religion at Luther College and he was the Chair of the Department of Religion from 2008-2011.

== Biography ==
=== Education ===
Shedinger received his B.S. in Civil Engineering Technology at Temple University in 1982 (Graduated Magna Cum Laude). In 1994 he received his M.Div. at Eastern Baptist Theological Seminary. In 1998 Shedinger received his M.A. in Religious Studies at Temple University. From 2000, he holds his Ph.D from Temple University in Religious Studies, with his dissertation: Tatian and the Jewish Scriptures (accepted with distinction) He also was Graduate Teaching Assistant while earning his Ph.D. in Religious Studies at Temple University.

=== Teaching ===
From 2000 to 2006, Shedinger served as Assistant Professor of Religion at Luther College. He was promoted to Associate Professor of Religion at Luther College from 2006 to 2014 and to Professor of Religion at Luther College in 2014.

=== Awards ===
Shedinger received the Award for Excellence in Biblical Studies conferred by the American Bible Society.

== Views ==
His research interests revolve around the question "What is Religion?", which includes the Syriac versional tradition of the New Testament, theoretical approaches to the study of religion, and Christian-Muslim relations in the contemporary world.

Shedinger initiated a hypothesis in which he proposes "that the theory of Tatianic dependence upon de OTP [Old Testament Peshitta] is tenuous at best", against Jan Joosten's reaction: "Tatianic use of the OT Peshitta has been stablished more strongly that before as a viable hypothesis." William Lawrence Petersen "enderses neither position", and according to Ulrich B. Schmid this debate has not generated a true consensus on the question of Tatianic use of the Old Testament Peshitta.

Shedinger has also been able to cite examples where the Shem Tob's Hebrew Gospel of Matthew coincides with many readings in the Greek Gospel of Matthew and those found only on 𝔓^{45}, thus supporting Howard's thesis that the Shem Tob's text was based on an ancient Hebrew text. Additionally he finds 67 other variants among ancient Greek texts "neither the Byzantine manuscript tradition nor the Vulgate and Latin tradition".

== Works ==
=== Thesis ===
- Robert Frederick Shedinger (2000). Tatian and the Jewish scriptures: a textual and philosophical analysis of the Old Testament citations in Tatian's Diatessaron (Dissertation: Ph. D. Temple University). OCLC 239853036.

=== Books ===
- Robert F Shedinger; Deborah J Spink (2001). Who killed Goliath?: reading the Bible with heart and mind. Valley Forge, PA: Judson Press. ISBN 9780817013745. OCLC 44802967.
- Robert F Shedinger (2003). Tatian and the Jewish scriptures: A Textual Philosophical Analysis of the Old Testament citations in Tatian's Diatessaron. Corpus scriptorum Christianorum Orientalium. Vol. 591. Leuven: Peeters; Hadleigh: BRAD. ISBN 9789042910423. OCLC 51270457.
- Robert F Shedinger (2009). Was Jesus a Muslim?: questioning categories in the study of religion. Minneapolis: Fortress Press. ISBN 9780800663254. OCLC 233543762.
- Robert F Shedinger (2012). Jesus. Oxford bibliographies., Islamic studies. [New York]: Oxford University Press. OCLC 858992332.
- Robert F Shedinger (2012). Radically open: transcending religious identity in an age of anxiety. Eugene, Oregon: Cascade Books. ISBN 9781620320426. OCLC 823041457.
- Robert F Shedinger (2015). Jesus and jihad: reclaiming the prophetic heart of Christianity and Islam. Eugene, OR: Cascade Books. ISBN 9781498220217. OCLC 913137261.
- Robert F Shedinger (2019). The mystery of evolutionary mechanisms: Darwinian biology's grand narrative of triumph and the subversion of religion. Eugene, Oregon, Cascade Books. OCLC 1049815298.

=== Articles ===
- Shedinger, Robert F. (2000). "Kuhnian Paradigms and Biblical Scholarship: Is Biblical Studies a Science?". Journal of Biblical Literature. 119 (3). The Society of Biblical Literature: 453–471. doi:10.2307/3268409. JSTOR 3268409.
- Shedinger, Robert F. (1999). "Did Tatian Use the Old Testament Peshitta? A Response to Jan Joosten". Novum Testamentum. 41 (3): 265–79. JSTOR 1561384.2026.
