= Diatessaron =

2nd century gospel harmony by Tatian

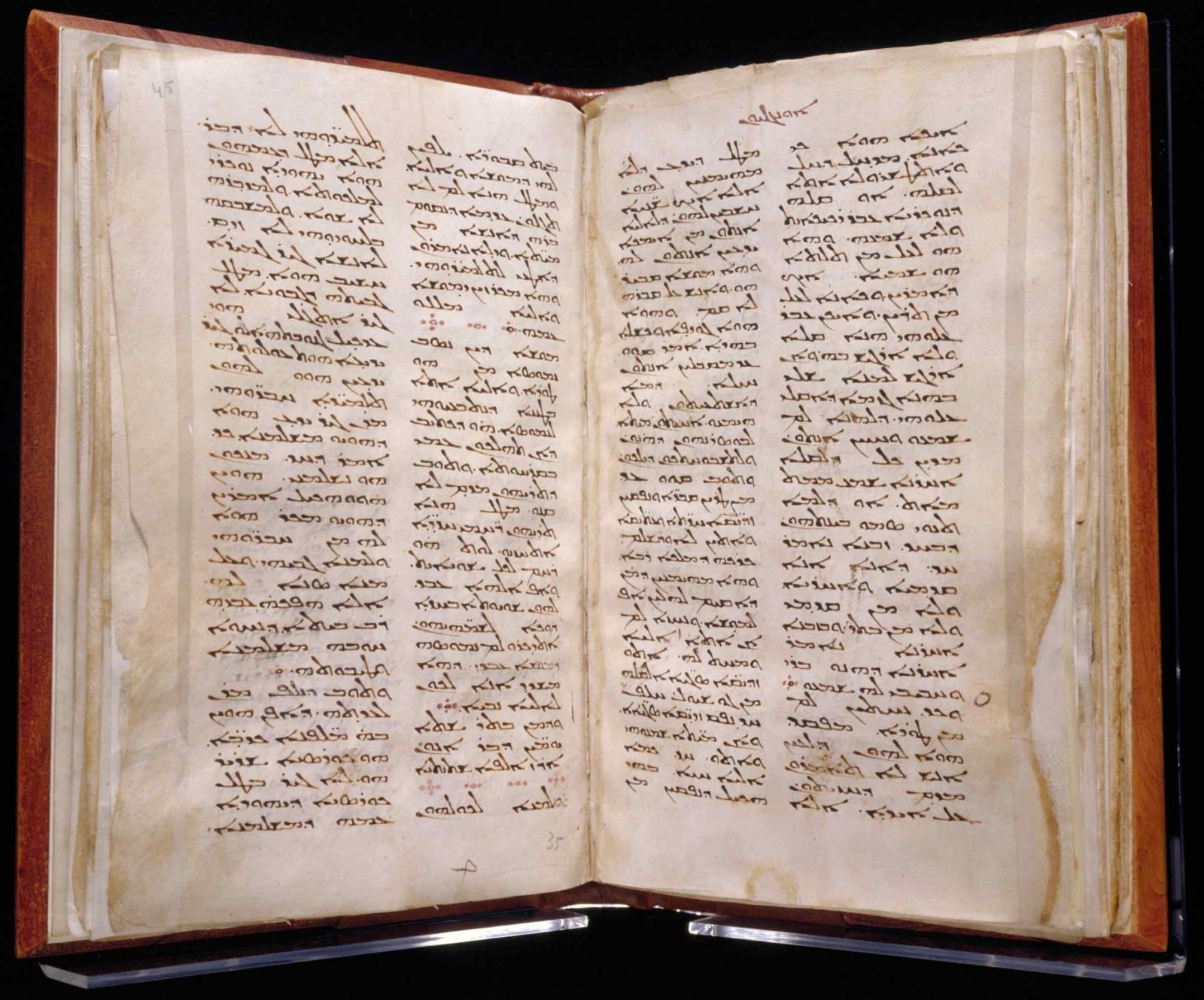
Parchment manuscript of the Ephrem's Commentary on the Diatessaron, from Egypt, late 5th or early 6th century, in the Chester Beatty Library

The Diatessaron (Syriac: ܐܘܢܓܠܝܘܢ ܕܡܚܠܛܐ, romanized: Ewangeliyôn Damhalltê; c. 166–169 AD) is the most prominent early gospel harmony. It was created in the Syriac language by Tatian, an Assyrian early Christian apologist and ascetic. Tatian sought to combine all the textual material he found in the four gospels – Matthew, Mark, Luke, and John – into a single coherent narrative of Jesus's life and death. However, and in contradistinction to most later gospel harmonists, Tatian appears not to have been motivated by any aspiration to validate the four separate canonical gospel accounts; or to demonstrate that, as they stood, they could each be shown as being without inconsistency or error.

Although widely used by early Syriac Christians, the original text has not survived. It was reconstructed in 1881 by Theodor Zahn from translations and commentaries.

== Terminology ==
The title Diatessaron comes from the Latin diatessarōn, meaning: "made of four [ingredients]"; this is derived in turn from Greek, διὰ τεσσάρων (dia tessarōn), meaning "out of four" (i.e., διά, dia, "at intervals of" and tessarōn [genitive of τέσσαρες, tessares], "four").

The Syriac name for this gospel harmony is 'ܐܘܢܓܠܝܘܢ ܕܡܚܠܛܐ' (Ewangeliyôn Damhalltê) meaning: "Gospel of the Mixed".

== Overview ==
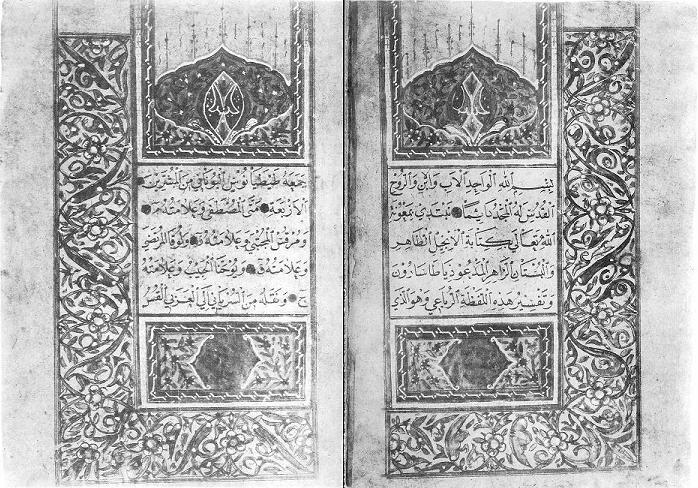
Arabic Diatessaron, translated by Abul Faraj al-Tayyib from Syriac to Arabic, 11th century

Tatian's harmony follows the gospels closely in terms of text but, in order to fit all the canonical material in, he created his own narrative sequence, which is different from both the synoptic sequence and John's sequence; and occasionally creates intervening time periods that are found in none of the source accounts. This sequence is coherent and consistent within itself, but not necessarily consistent with that in all or any of the separate canonical gospels; and Tatian apparently applies the same principle in respect of the narrative itself. Where the gospels differ from one another in respect of the details of an event or teaching, the Diatessaron resolves such apparent contradictions by selecting one or another alternative wording and adding consistent details from the other gospels; while omitting apparent duplicate matter, especially across the synoptics. Hence, in respect of the healing of the blind at Jericho the Diatessaron reports only one blind man, Bartimeaus, healed by Jesus when leaving the city according to the account in Mark 10:46ff (expanded with phrases from Luke 18:36–37); consequently omitting any separate mention of two unnamed blind men healed by Jesus leaving Jericho (Matthew 20:29ff), and also the healing by Jesus entering Jericho the previous day of a single unnamed blind man (Luke 18:35ff).

Otherwise, Tatian originally omitted altogether both of the different genealogies in Matthew and Luke, as well as Luke's introduction (Luke 1:1–4); and also did not originally include Jesus' encounter with the adulteress (the pericope adulterae: John 7:53–8:11). The pericope is present in western manuscripts believed to be based on the Diatessaron (e.g., Codex Fuldensis) but is generally considered to be a latter interpolation to the Gospel of John, with the Diatessaron itself often cited as an early textual witness in support of its omission.

Tatian added no significant wording to the textual material he took from the separate gospels. Only 56 verses in the canonical Gospels do not have a counterpart in the Diatessaron, mostly the genealogies and the pericope adulterae. The final work is about 72 per cent the length of the four gospels put together; around a quarter of the text of the separate gospels being adjudged by Tatian to be duplicated. (McFall, 1994).

In the early Church, the gospels at first circulated independently, with Matthew the most popular. The Diatessaron is notable evidence for the authority already enjoyed by the gospels by the mid- to late-2nd century. Within twenty years after Tatian's harmony was written, Irenaeus was expressly arguing for the authoritative character of the Four Gospels. It is unclear whether Tatian intended the Diatessaron to supplement or replace the four separate gospels; but both outcomes came to pass in different churches. The Diatessaron became adopted as the standard lectionary text of the gospels in some Syriac-speaking churches from the late 2nd to the 5th century, until it gave way to the four separate Gospels such as the Syriac Sinaitic gospels, or later in the Peshitta version. At the same time, in the churches of the Latin west, the Diatessaron circulated as a supplement to the four gospels, especially in the Latin translation.

== Recensions and translations ==
A number of recensions of the Diatessaron are extant. The earliest, part of the Eastern family of recensions, is preserved in 4th century theologian Ephrem the Syrian's Commentary on Tatian's work, which itself is preserved in two versions: an Armenian translation preserved in two copies, and a copy of Ephrem's original Syriac text dated to the late 5th or early 6th century, which has been edited by Louis Leloir (Paris, 1966).

Many other translations have been made, sometimes including substantial revisions to the text. There are translations into Arabic, Latin, Old Georgian, Old High German, Middle High German, Middle English, Middle Dutch and Old Italian. There is a Persian harmony that seems to have borrowed some readings from the Diatessaron. There are also Parthian texts with borrowings from the Diatessaron. The Arabic translation was made by Ibn al-Tayyib in the early 11th century from the original Syriac.

== Tatian's harmony ==
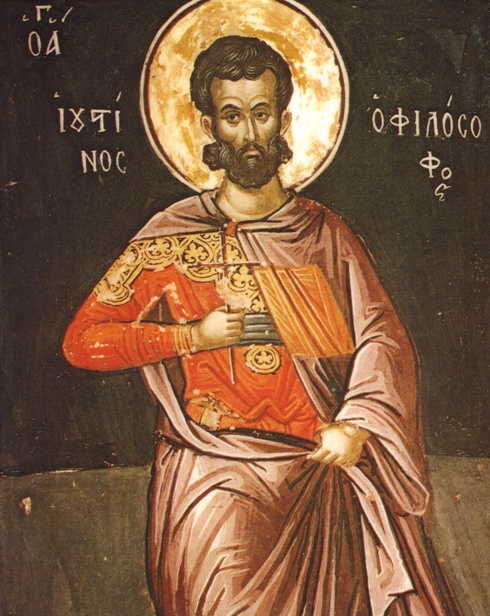
Tatian was a pupil of 2nd-century Christian convert, apologist, and philosopher Justin Martyr

Tatian was an Assyrian who was a pupil of Justin Martyr in Rome, where, Justin says, the apomnemoneumata (recollections or memoirs) of the Apostles, the gospels, were read every Sunday. When Justin quotes the synoptic Gospels, he tends to do so in a harmonised form, and Helmut Koester and others conclude that Justin must have possessed a Greek harmony text of Matthew, Luke and Mark.

If so, it is unclear how much Tatian may have borrowed from this previous author in determining his own narrative sequence of Gospel elements. It is equally unclear whether Tatian took the Syriac Gospel texts composited into his Diatessaron from a previous translation, or whether the translation was his own. Where the Diatessaron records Gospel quotations from the Jewish Scriptures, the text appears to agree with that found in the Syriac Peshitta Old Testament rather than that found in the Greek Septuagint—as used by the original Gospel authors. The majority consensus is that the Peshitta Old Testament preceded the Diatessaron, and represents an independent translation from the Hebrew Bible. Resolution of these scholarly questions remained very difficult so long as no complete version of the Diatessaron in Syriac or Greek had been recovered; while the medieval translations that had survived—in Arabic and Latin—both relied on texts that had been heavily corrected to conform better with later canonical versions of the separate Gospel texts.

There is scholarly uncertainty about what language Tatian used for its original composition, whether Syriac or Greek.

== Diatessaron in Syriac Christianity ==
The Diatessaron was used as the standard Gospel text in the liturgy of at least some sections of the Syrian Church for three centuries and was quoted or alluded to by Syrian writers. Ephrem the Syrian wrote a commentary on it, the Syriac original of which was rediscovered only in 1957, when a manuscript acquired by Sir Chester Beatty in 1957 (now Chester Beatty Syriac MS 709, Dublin) turned out to contain the text of Ephrem's commentary. The manuscript constituted approximately half of the leaves of a volume of Syriac writings that had been catalogued in 1952 in the library of the Coptic monastery of Deir es-Suriani in Wadi Natrun, Egypt. Subsequently, the Chester Beatty library was able to track down and buy a further 42 leaves, so that now approximately eighty per cent of the Syriac commentary is available (McCarthy 1994). Ephrem did not comment on all passages in the Diatessaron, and nor does he always quote commentated passages in full; but for those phrases that he does quote, the commentary provides for the first time a dependable witness to Tatian's original; and also confirms its content and their sequence. .

Theodoret, bishop of Cyrrhus on the Euphrates in upper Syria in 423, suspecting Tatian of having been a heretic, destroyed copies of the Diatessaron.

According to an English translation of Theodoret's Compendium of Heretical Fables:

Tatian the Syrian was first a sophist, and then he also became a student of the divine Justin the martyr. [...] This man also composed the so-called Gospel of the Four [Greek: διὰ τεσσάρων, dia tessaron], cutting out the genealogies, and the other things which show the Lord born according to the flesh from the seed of David. [...] And I myself found more than two hundred such books held in honor in the churches in our area, and having collected them all, I put them away, and I substituted the Gospels of the four evangelists.

Muslim scholar Ali J. Ataie argues that Waraqah ibn Nawfal, a Christian heretical cleric related to Muhammad's wife Khadija, may have seen the first granted revelation as in continuity with previous gospels and accepting his prophethood after interpreting and correlating from the Diatessaron.

== Vernacular harmonies derived from the Diatessaron ==
No Christian tradition, other than some Syriac ones, has ever adopted a harmonized Gospel text for use in its liturgy. However, in many traditions, it was not unusual for subsequent Christian generations to seek to provide paraphrased Gospel versions in language closer to the vernacular of their own day. Frequently such versions have been constructed as Gospel harmonies, sometimes taking Tatian's Diatessaron as an exemplar; other times proceeding independently. Hence from the Syriac Diatessaron text was derived an 11th-century Arabic harmony (the source for the published versions of the Diatessaron in English); and a 13th-century Persian harmony. The Arabic harmony preserves Tatian's sequence exactly, but uses a source text corrected in most places to that of the standard Syriac Peshitta Gospels; the Persian harmony differs greatly in sequence, but translates a Syriac text that is rather closer to that in Ephrem's commentary.

A Vetus Latina version of Tatian's Syriac text appears to have circulated in the West from the late 2nd century; with a sequence adjusted to conform more closely to that of the canonical Gospel of Luke; and also including additional canonical text (such as the Pericope Adulterae), and possibly non-canonical matter from the Gospel of the Hebrews. With the gradual adoption of the Vulgate as the liturgical Gospel text of the Latin Church, the Latin Diatessaron was increasingly modified to conform to Vulgate readings. In 546 Victor of Capua discovered such a mixed manuscript; and, further corrected by Victor so as to provide a very pure Vulgate text within a modified Diatessaron sequence and to restore the two genealogies of Jesus side-by-side, this harmony, the Codex Fuldensis, survives in the monastic library at Fulda, where it served as the source text for vernacular harmonies in Old High German, Eastern Frankish and Old Saxon (the alliterative poem 'Heliand'). The older mixed Vulgate/Diatessaron text type also appears to have continued as a distinct tradition, as such texts appear to underlie surviving 13th–14th century Gospel harmonies in Middle Dutch, Middle High German, Middle French, Middle English, Tuscan and Venetian; although no example of this hypothetical Latin sub-text has ever been identified. The Liège Diatessaron is a particularly poetic example. This Latin Diatessaron textual tradition has also been suggested as underlying the 16th century Islam-influenced Gospel of Barnabas (Joosten, 2002).

== Use of the word "God" ==
Robert F. Shedinger writes that in quotations to the Old Testament where the great uncial codices have κύριος and the Hebrew OT manuscripts יהוה (YHWH), Tatian wrote the term "God". Pavlos D. Vasileiadis reports that "Shedinger proposed that the Syriac Diatessaron, composed some time after the middle of the second century CE, may provide additional confirmation of Howard's hypothesis (Tatian and the Jewish Scriptures, 136–140). Additionally, within the Syriac Peshitta is discernible the distinction between κύριος rendered as ܡܪܝܐ (marya, which means "lord" and refers to the God as signified by the Tetragrammaton; see Lu 1:32) and ܡܪܢ (maran, a more generic term for "lord"; see Joh 21:7)." R. F. Shedinger holds that after יהוה, θεός could be a term before κύριος became the standard term in the New Testament Greek copies.

Shedinger's work has been strongly criticized. Since Tatian's Diatessaron is known only indirectly from references to it in other works, Shedinger's dissertation is based on his collection of 69 possible readings, only two of which, in the judgment of William L. Petersen, reach the level of probability. Peterson complains of Shedinger's "inconsistent methodology" and says that the surviving readings do not support his conclusions. Petersen thinks the dissertation should never have been accepted for a doctoral degree, in view of "the illogical arguments, inconsistent standards, philological errors, and methodological blunders that mar this book. [...] the errors are so frequent and so fundamental that this volume can contribute nothing to scholarship. What it says that is true has already been said elsewhere, with greater clarity and perspective. What it says that is new is almost always wrong, plagued [...] with philological, logical, and methodological errors, and a gross insensitivity to things historical (both within the discipline, as well as the transmission-history of texts). Reading this book fills one with dismay and despair. It is shocking that a work which does not rise to the level of a master's thesis should be approved as a doctoral dissertation; how it found its way into print is unfathomable. One shudders to think of the damage it will do when, in the future, it is cited by the ignorant and the unsuspecting as "demonstrating" what it has not." Jan Joosten's review of Shedinger's work is also condemnatory. In his judgment "Shedinger's study remains unconvincing, not only in the final conclusions but also in the details of the argument."

== See also ==
- Dura Parchment 24
- Papyrus 25
- Eusebian Canons
- Old High German Tatian
