= Louis Leloir =

Belgian Benedictine monk (1911–1992)

Dom Louis Leloir, O.S.B., (1911–1992), originating from Namur, Belgium, was a Benedictine monk at the Abbey of Clervaux, Clervaux, Luxembourg. His preoccupations were with oecumenical relations, especially with Judaism, and with research into early monasticism, Armenian and Syriac patristics and apocryphal literature. Leloir was ordained in 1935, studied at the Pontifical Biblical Institute in Rome, and was also at the Abbey of St. Jerome, Rome. He was granted his doctoral degree (summa cum laude) from the Biblicum in 1956 for his dissertation on the witness of Ephrem the Syrian to the Diatessaron.

== Selected works ==
- Commentaire de l'Evangile concordant ou Diatesseron, par Ephrem de Nisibe, traduit du syriaque et de l'arménien, par Louis Leloir, Cerf, coll. Sources Chrétiennes no. 121, 1966.
- Le moine selon la tradition arménienne, Pères Mékhitaristes de Venise, 1969.
- Désert et Communion - témoignage des Pères du désert recueillis à partir des "Paterica" arméniens, Bellefontaine, 1978.
- Ecrits apocryphes sur les Apôtres, traduit de l'édition arménienne de Venise, Corpus Christianorum: Series Apocryphorum, 2 vol., 1986, 1992.
- "La "lectio divina" chez les Pères du désert", La Vie Spirituelle, no. 740, 2001.
- "Les Pères du désert et saint Benoît. Un apophtegme d'Antoine", Nouvelle Revue Théologique, no. 102-2, 1980.

A further 22 works by Louis Leloir are listed on Karsruher Virtueller Katalog search engine REGESTA IMPERII published by Akademie Der Wissenschaften unter der Literatur Mainz.
