= Henri-Charles Puech =

Henri-Charles Puech (French pronunciation: [ɑ̃ʁi ʃaʁl pɥɛʃ]; 20 July 1902, Montpellier – 11 January 1986, aged 83) was a French historian who long held the chair of History of religions at the Collège de France from 1952 to 1972.

== Biography ==
A philosopher by training, he was interested in Greek philosophy, especially in hermetism and neoplatonism, before turning to the study of Christian doctrines of the early centuries, a discipline he long taught in the École pratique des hautes études. His teaching had a great influence on the development of patristics studies in the second half of the twentieth in France. But it is primarily as a result of the discovery of new documents in the study of Manichaeism and the various systems of Gnostic thought that he gained international recognition.

A long collaborator of the Revue de l'histoire des religions before he directed it, he presided the Association internationale pour l'étude de l'histoire des religions from 1950 to 1965.

== Honours ==
- Officier of the Légion d'honneur (1963)
- Commandeur of the Ordre of the Palmes académiques (1965)
- Commandeur of the Ordre national du Mérite (1969)

== Work ==
- 1970: Histoire des religions, 3 vol., Éditions Gallimard
- 1978: En quête de la gnose, Paris, Gallimard, series "Bibliothèque des Sciences Humaines", 2 volumes Tome 1 : La Gnose et le Temps. Tome 2 : Sur l'évangile selon Thomas
- 1979: Sur le manichéisme et autres essais, Paris, Flammarion, series "Idées et recherches"
