= Tatian =

2nd-century Syriac Christian writer and theologian

Tatian of Adiabene, or Tatian the Syrian or Tatian the Assyrian, (/ˈteɪʃən, -iən/; Latin: Tatianus; Ancient Greek: Τατιανός; Classical Syriac: ܛܛܝܢܘܣ; c. 112 – c. 180 AD) was an Assyrian Christian writer and theologian of the 2nd century.

Tatian's most influential work is the Diatessaron, a Biblical paraphrase, or "harmony", of the four gospels that became the standard text of the four gospels in the Syriac-speaking churches until the 5th-century, after which it gave way to the four separate gospels in the Peshitta version. He was controversial in his own age due to his Gnostic influences, leading Russell to state Tatian "lived in the border between orthodox and Gnostic theology".

== Life ==
Concerning the date and place of his birth, little is known beyond what Tatian tells about himself in his Oratio ad Graecos, chap. xlii (Ante-Nicene Fathers, ii. 81–82): that he was born in "the land of the Assyrians", scholarly consensus is that he died c. AD 185, perhaps in Adiabene.

He travelled to Rome, where he first encountered Christianity. During his prolonged stay in Rome, according to his own representation, his abhorrence of the pagan cults sparked deep reflections on religious problems. Through the Old Testament, he wrote, he grew convinced of the unreasonableness of paganism. He adopted the Christian religion and became the pupil of Justin Martyr. During this period Christian philosophers competed with Greek sophists. Like Justin, Tatian opened a Christian school in Rome.

Knowledge of Tatian's life following the death of Justin in AD 165 is to some extent obscure. Irenaeus remarks (Haer., I., xxviii. 1, Ante-Nicene Fathers, i. 353) that after the death of Justin, he was expelled from the church for his Encratitic (ascetic) views, as well as for being a follower of the Gnostic leader Valentinius. Eusebius refers to a belief that Tatian had founded the Encratitic sect. It is clear that Tatian left Rome, perhaps to reside for a while in either Greece or Alexandria, where he may have taught Clement of Alexandria. Epiphanius relates that Tatian established a school in Mesopotamia, the influence of which extended to Antioch in Syria, and was felt in Cilicia and especially in Pisidia.

The early development of the Church of the East furnishes a commentary on Tatian's attitude in practical life. Thus, for Aphrahat, baptism conditions the taking of a vow in which the catechumen promises celibacy. This shows how firmly Tatian's views were established in the Syriac Christian area, and it supports the supposition that Tatian was the missionary of the countries around the Euphrates.

== Writings ==
His Oratio ad Graecos (Address to the Greeks) condemns paganism as worthless, and praises the reasonableness and high antiquity of Christianity. As early as Eusebius, Tatian was praised for his discussions of the antiquity of Moses and of Jewish legislation, and it was because of this chronological section that his Oratio was not generally condemned.

His other major work was the Diatessaron, a "harmony" or synthesis of the four New Testament Gospels into a combined narrative of the life of Jesus. Ephrem the Syrian referred to it as the Evangelion da Mehallete ("The Gospel of the Mixed"), and it was practically the only gospel text used in Assyria during the 3rd and 4th centuries.

In the mid 5th century the Diatessaron was replaced in those Assyrian churches that used it by the four original Gospels. Rabbula, Bishop of Edessa, ordered the priests and deacons to see that every church should have a copy of the separate Gospels (Evangelion da Mepharreshe), and Theodoret, Bishop of Cyrus, removed more than two hundred copies of the Diatessaron from the churches in his diocese. The Syriac Sinaitic manuscript of gospels was produced in between AD 411 and 435 as a result of his edict.

A number of recensions of the Diatessaron are extant. The earliest, part of the Eastern family of recensions, is preserved in Ephrem's Commentary on Tatian's work, which itself is preserved in two versions: an Armenian translation preserved in two copies, and a copy of Ephrem's original Syriac text from the late 5th/early 6th century, which has been edited by Louis Leloir (Paris, 1966). Other translations include translations made into Arabic, Persian, and Old Georgian. A fragment of a narrative about the Passion found in the ruins of Dura-Europos in 1933 was once thought to have been from the Diatessaron, but more recent scholarly judgement does not connect it directly to Tatian's work.

The earliest member of the Western family of recensions is the Latin Codex Fuldensis, written at the request of bishop Victor of Capua in 545 AD. Although the text is clearly dependent on the Vulgate, the order of the passages is distinctly how Tatian arranged them. Tatian's influence can be detected much earlier in such Latin manuscripts as the Old Latin translation of the Bible, in Novatian's surviving writings, and in the Roman Antiphony. After the Codex Fuldensis, it would appear that members of the Western family led an underground existence, popping into view over the centuries in an Old High German translation (c. 830), a Dutch (c. 1280), a Venetian manuscript of the 13th century, and a Middle English manuscript from 1400 that was once owned by Samuel Pepys.

In a lost writing entitled On Perfection according to the Doctrine of the Savior, Tatian designates matrimony as a symbol of the tying of the flesh to the perishable world and ascribed the "invention" of matrimony to the devil. He distinguishes between the old and the new man; the old man is the law, the new man the Gospel. Other lost writings of Tatian include a work written before the Oratio ad Graecos that contrasts the nature of man with the nature of the animals, and a Problematon biblion, which aimed to present a compilation of obscure Scripture sayings.

== Theology ==
The starting-point of Tatian's theology is a strict monotheism which becomes the source of the moral life. Originally, the human soul possessed faith in one God, but lost it with the fall. In consequence, under the rule of demons, man sank into the abominable error of polytheism. By monotheistic faith, the soul is delivered from the material world and from demonic rule and is united with God. God is spirit (pneuma), but not the physical or stoical pneuma; he was alone before the creation, but he had within himself potentially the whole creation. Some scholars consider Tatian's creation theology as the beginning of teaching "ex nihilo" (creation from "nothing").

The means of creation was the dynamis logike ("power expressed in words"). At first there proceeded from God the Logos who, generated in the beginning, was to produce the world by creating matter from which the whole creation sprang. Creation is penetrated by the pneuma hylikon, "world spirit," which is common to angels, stars, men, animals, and plants. This world spirit is lower than the divine pneuma, and becomes in man the psyche or "soul," so that on the material side and in his soul man does not differ essentially from the animals; though at the same time he is called to a peculiar union with the divine spirit, which raises him above the animals. This spirit is the image of God in man, and to it man's immortality is due.

The first-born of the spirits, identified with Satan, fell and caused others to fall, and thus the demons originated. The fall of the spirits was brought about through their desire to separate man from God, in order that he might serve not God but them. Man, however, was implicated in this fall, lost his blessed abode and his soul was deserted by the divine spirit, and sank into the material sphere, in which only a faint reminiscence of God remained alive. Demons since acquire more material bodies. Tatian identified the pagan gods as demon, stating their leader was called Zeus. They use their knowledge and power to lure men into believing in destiny, magic, astrology and medicine, the latter of which is actually a demonic deception.

As by freedom man fell, so by freedom he may turn again to God. The Spirit unites with the souls of those who walk uprightly; through the prophets he reminds men of their lost likeness to God. Although Tatian does not mention the name of Jesus, his doctrine of redemption culminates in his Christology.

== Historiography ==
Unlike Justin, who had related the new Christian doctrine to philosophy, Tatian manifests a violent rejection of the forms of philosophical literature with which he is familiar and consequently turns to a safer literary genre: the writing of history.

He thus recapitulates his treatise:

Thus I believe I have summarily but with all my rigor analyzed the treatises of the sages, their 'chronologies' (χρόνοι) and their archives (ναγραφαί), each one in particular" (Tatian Oratio ad Graecos 41.2-3).

Tatian gives the voice for the first time in the Christian lexicon to ναγραφή, annals or documentary chronology. Tatian claims that the Greeks learned historiography from the Egyptians (Oratio ad Graecos 1.1), who possessed exact techniques for chronology (38.1). For the Syriac the Greeks are skillful literati, bad philosophers, but they can never be good historians, for "for those who have a disjointed chronology it is impossible to say what is true of history" (31.4). The Greeks are embellishers of language and, in general, with respect to productive and artistic techniques they are skilled imitators, not creators or discoverers: "stop calling imitations inventions" (Oratio ad Graecos 1.1). He then asserts that the Greeks received from other cultures all the disciplines that they managed to practice: divination by dreams, prognostication by the stars, observation of the flight of birds, the art of sacrifice, astronomy, magic, geometry, the alphabet, poetry, singing, the mysteries, plastic arts, anagraphic records, the manufacture of musical instruments and metallurgy (1.1-2) he specifies in each case the nation from which the knowledge that the Greeks have of the arts comes. However, although he does not recognize the inventive capacity of the Greeks, Tatian describes himself as a prudent historian on the model of Thucydides, whom he never names. He presents himself as a scholar of documentation "with all my rigor <for you>" (Oratio 41.2.13) Thucydides' principle. He also distinguishes between annals and documents that are within the historian's reach and things that fall outside his direct knowledge (Oratio ad Graecos 20.2), another of Thucydides' principles. He then accepts the caution of the Greek historians who rejected the mythological 'archaeology' with which the ancient ethnographers and historians (Titus Livy) had covered the dark path between the known facts and the legendary origin of each city or ethnic group. Another characteristic of the rigorous historian is the personal inspection of places and cities with the discernment of the various types of documentation and sources:

Well then, all these things I do not expound because I learned them from another but because, traveling through many lands I have been a teacher of your own doctrines and have examined many arts and conceptions and finally I was able to study with attention the variety of statues brought by you to the city of Rome. For I do not seek to confirm my doctrines, as the vulgar do, with opinions foreign to my own, but 'I wish to compose anagraphs' (τὴν ἀναγραφὴν συντάσσσειν βούλομαι) on all those things which by myself I have understood (Oratio ad Graecos 35.1).

What Tatian seems to propose is thus not a philosophy, theology, or exegesis of some revealed text, but a historical truth that attentive study can achieve. Nor does he do mythology because in impugning the mythologists as a whole, he uses an argument consonant with the critical historians: Greek theology is mythology, literary invention, with no content of truth. For the first time the voice μυθολογία appears in the Christian lexicon (Oratio ad Graecos 40.1); it specifically signifies the falsification of the philosophy of Moses perpetrated by the Greeks. Their poetry is shameful but, nevertheless, not false in an absolute way, because the 'gods' exist and act: they are the 'demons', who impinge on the deviation of human behavior and are the ones who manage the destructive and evil culture of the whole Greek παιδεία. Greek theology, then, is seen not as a praeparatio evangelica but as a degradatio mosaica, that is, as an imitative corruption of the writings of the Bible (40.1). Consequently, he ends up sustaining several theses, the main one being that Moses is older than all the legislators and writers of humanity (31; 36.2-40.1); that there is no plurality of gods but creational monarchy (Oratio ad Graecos 29.2); that there is no plurality of worlds but only one with only one final judgment to come, which is to be universal (Oratio ad Graecos 6.1). The literary genre of the Oratio is still that of apologetics, with elements of diatribe and protreptic. Sterling has called it "apologetic historiography."

== See also ==
- Greek Gospel of the Egyptians
