= Ebionites =

Early Christian movement

Ebionites (Ancient Greek: Ἐβιωναῖοι, romanized: Ebiōnaîoi, derived from the Hebrew word אֶבְיוֹנִים, ʾEḇyōnīm, meaning 'the poor' or 'poor ones') were an adoptionist Mosaic law-observant Jewish-Christian movement that existed in and around Transjordan during the early centuries of the Common Era. They first appear in heresiographies from the latter half of the second century. Since original writings by Ebionites are scarce, fragmentary and contested, much of what is known or conjectured about them derives from the polemical reports by their proto-orthodox and later orthodox Christian opponents, the Church Fathers (Irenaeus, Origen, Eusebius, and Epiphanius of Salamis), who generally portrayed Ebionites as a heretical sect doctrinally distinct from other judaizing Jewish-Christian sects, such as the Nazarenes.

Most Church Fathers characterize Ebionites as holding a functional adoptionist Christology that rejects the belief that Jesus was a divine person (God the Son) at any stage of his earthly life, whether before (pre-existence), during (incarnation), or after it (exaltation), and instead presents him as a righteous human being who, through faithful observance of the Law of Moses, was adopted by God at his baptism to fulfill the role of prophet and Jewish Messiah. Condemning Paul as a false apostle and an apostate from the Law, Ebionites are said to have used a Hebrew version of the Gospel of Matthew, or one of the Jewish-Christian gospels, as their only additional scripture alongside the Hebrew Bible, and to have maintained faithful observance of the commandments of the Abrahamic and Mosaic covenants as binding on all followers of Jesus, with an emphasis on his authoritative teachings on the Law.

Some patristic heresiologists recognize variations in Christology among Ebionites: a majority did not believe that Jesus was born of a virgin, affirming that he was the natural son of Joseph and Mary, while a minority believed in the virgin birth, with both groups rejecting belief in the divinity of Jesus. Some scholars have suggested that the reported disagreement over the virgin birth reflects a patristic conflation of the Ebionites with the closely related Jewish-Christian Nazarenes, who accepted the virgin birth, and that the Ebionites themselves may have uniformly rejected it. Epiphanius is the only Church Father who claims Ebionites held a separationist "angelic possession" Christology, opposed animal sacrifice and embraced vegetarianism. Some modern commentators regard many of Epiphanius's additional details as unreliable, so the theological diversity among Ebionites he describes cannot be taken at face value.

Critical scholars judge that the Church Fathers' condemnation of Ebionites as "heretics" reflects the inherently polemical perspective of Christian heresiographies. However, scholars debate whether or not core Ebionite beliefs rooted in late Second Temple Judaism, especially their emphasis on covenant faithfulness and their expectation of a fully human Messiah in the mold of a "prophet like Moses", preserve, whether through direct inheritance or later reconstruction, traditions resembling those of the early Jerusalem church under the leadership of James the Just, the brother of Jesus, and possibly certain elements of the teachings of the historical Jesus himself.

== Name ==
The hellenized Hebrew term Ebionite was first applied by Irenaeus in the second century without making mention of Nazarenes (c. 180 CE). Origen wrote "for Ebion signifies 'poor' among the Jews, and those Jews who have received Jesus as Christ are called by the name of Ebionites." Tertullian was the first to write against a heresiarch called Ebion; scholars believe he derived this name from a literal reading of Ebionaioi as 'followers of Ebion', a derivation now considered mistaken for lack of any more substantial references to such a figure. The term the poor (Greek: ptōkhoí) was still used in its original, more general sense. Modern Hebrew still uses the Biblical Hebrew term the needy for almsgiving to the needy at Purim.

Scholar James Tabor argues that Ebionites most likely named themselves after "the poor in spirit", that is, people whose economic and social poverty foster spiritual humility and a conscious dependence on God. He connects this self-designation to the first of nine in-groups mentioned in the Beatitudes of Jesus in Matthew 5:3, who are described as blessed and as to whom the kingdom of heaven belongs.

== History ==
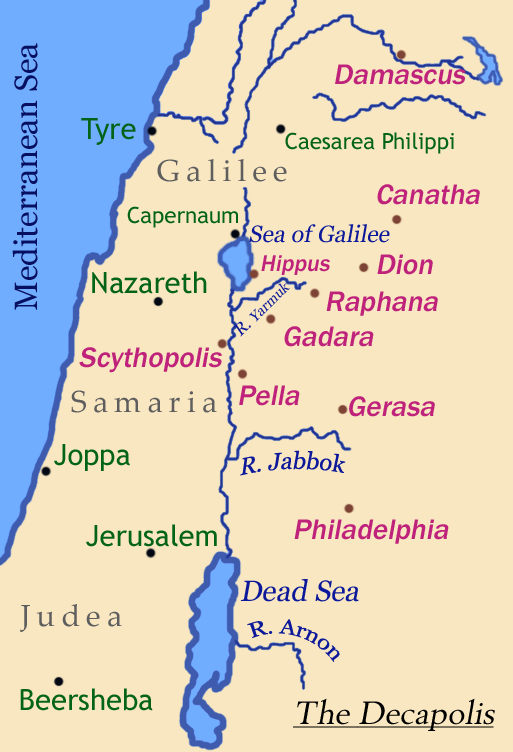
Map of the Decapolis showing the location of Pella.

=== Emergence ===
Irenaeus (c. 180) documents the first use the term Ebionites to name a movement he labeled as a heretical sect of "Judaizers" for "stubbornly clinging to the Law".

Cerinthus, again, a man who was educated in the wisdom of the Egyptians, taught that the world was not made by the primary God, but by a certain Power far separated from him, and at a distance from that Principality who is supreme over the universe, and ignorant of him who is above all. He represented Jesus as having not been born of a virgin, but as being the son of Joseph and Mary according to the ordinary course of human generation, while he nevertheless was more righteous, prudent, and wise than other men. Moreover, after his baptism, Christ descended upon him in the form of a dove from the Supreme Ruler, and that then he proclaimed the unknown Father, and performed miracles. But at last Christ departed from Jesus, and that then Jesus suffered and rose again, while Christ remained impassible, inasmuch as he was a spiritual being. Those who are called Ebionites agree that the world was made by God; but their opinions with respect to the Lord are similar to those of Cerinthus and Carpocrates. They use the Gospel according to Matthew only, and repudiate the Apostle Paul, maintaining that he was an apostate from the law. As to the prophetical writings, they endeavour to expound them in a somewhat singular manner: they practise circumcision, persevere in the observance of those customs which are enjoined by the law, and are so Judaic in their style of life, that they even adore Jerusalem as if it were the house of God.

— Irenaeus, Against Heresies I, 26

Origen (c. 212) remarks that the name derives from the Hebrew word evyon, meaning 'poor'. Epiphanius of Salamis (c. 310–320 – 403) gives the most complete account in his heresiology called Panarion, denouncing eighty heretical sects, among them the Ebionites. Epiphanius mostly gives general descriptions of their religious beliefs and includes quotations from their gospels, which have not survived. According to the Encyclopædia Britannica, the Ebionite movement "may have arisen about the time of the destruction of the Jewish Temple in Jerusalem" (70 CE). The tentative dating of the origins of this movement depends on Epiphanius writing three centuries later and relying on information for the Ebionites from the Book of Elchasai, which may not have had anything to do with the Ebionites.

Paul talks of his collection for the "poor among the saints" in the early Jerusalem church, but this is generally taken as meaning the poorer members of the church as a whole.

The actual number of movements described as Ebionites is difficult to ascertain, as the contradictory patristic accounts in their attempt to distinguish various movements sometimes confuse them with each other. Other movements mentioned are the Carpocratians, the Cerinthians, the Elcesaites, the first century Nazarenes and the Sampsaeans, most of whom were Jewish Christian sects who held gnostic or other beliefs rejected by the Ebionites. Epiphanius, however, mentions that a sect of Ebionites came to embrace some of these beliefs despite keeping their name.

As the Ebionites are first mentioned as such in the second century, their earlier history and any relation to the Jerusalem church remains obscure and a matter of contention. There is no evidence linking the origin of the later movement of the Ebionites with the First Jewish-Roman War of 66–70 CE or with the Jerusalem church led by James. Eusebius relates a tradition, probably based on Aristo of Pella, that the early Christians left Jerusalem just prior to the war and fled to Pella, Jordan beyond the Jordan River, but does not connect this with Ebionites. They were led by Simeon of Jerusalem (d. 107) and during the Second Jewish-Roman War of 115–117, they were persecuted by the Jewish followers of Bar Kochba for refusing to recognize his messianic claims. As late as Epiphanius (310–403), members of the Ebionite movement resided in Nabatea, and Paneas, Moabitis, and Kochaba in the region of Bashan, near Adraa. From these places, they dispersed and went into Asia (Anatolia), Rome and Cyprus.

According to Harnack, the influence of Elchasaites places some Ebionites in the context of the gnostic movements widespread in Syria and the lands to the east.

=== Disappearance ===
After the end of the First Jewish–Roman War, the importance of the early Jerusalem church began to fade. Jewish Christianity became dispersed throughout the Jewish diaspora in the Levant, where it was slowly eclipsed by proto-orthodox Christianity, which then spread throughout the Roman Empire without competition from Jewish Christian movements. Once the Jerusalem church was eliminated during the Bar Kokhba revolt, which ended in 136 CE, the Ebionites gradually lost influence and followers. Although some scholars, such as Hyam Maccoby, argued the decline of the Ebionites was due to marginalization and persecution by both Jews and Christians, Maccoby's views as expressed in his works from the 1980s and 1990s have been nearly universally rejected by scholars. Following the defeat of the rebellion and the subsequent expulsion of Jews from Judea, Jerusalem became the Gentile city of Aelia Capitolina. Many of the Jewish Christians residing at Pella renounced their Jewish practices at this time and joined the mainstream Christian church. Those who remained at Pella and continued in obedience to the Law were labeled heretics. In 375, Epiphanius records the settlement of Ebionites on Cyprus, but by the 5th century, Theodoret of Cyrrhus reported that they were no longer present in the region.

The Ebionites are attested as definitely existing, though in marginal communities, down to the 5th century. Some modern scholars argue that the Ebionites survived much longer and identify them with a sect encountered by the historian Abd al-Jabbar ibn Ahmad around the year 1000. There is another possible reference to Ebionite communities that has them existing around the 11th century in northwestern Arabia, in Sefer Ha'masaot, the "Book of the Travels" of Rabbi Benjamin of Tudela, a rabbi from Spain. These communities were located in two cities, Tayma and "Tilmas", possibly Saada in Yemen. The 12th-century Muslim historian Muhammad al-Shahrastani mentions Jews living in nearby Medina and Hejaz who accepted Jesus as a prophetic figure and followed traditional Judaism, rejecting mainstream Christian beliefs. Some scholars propose that interactions between Ebionite communities and early Muslims played a role in shaping the Islamic perspective on Jesus.

== Beliefs and practices ==
=== Judaism, Gnosticism and Essenism ===
Most patristic sources portray Ebionites as Jews who faithfully observed the Law of Moses, revered Jerusalem as the holiest city and restricted table fellowship only to God-fearing Gentiles who converted to Judaism.

Some Church Fathers describe some Ebionites as departing from traditional Second Temple period Jewish principles of faith and practice. For example, Methodius of Olympus stated that Ebionites believed that the prophets spoke only by their own power and not by the power of the Holy Spirit. Epiphanius of Salamis stated that Ebionites held a separationist "angelic possession" Christology, engaged in excessive ritual washing, denied parts of the Law deemed obsolete or corrupt, opposed animal sacrifice, practiced vegetarianism and celebrated a commemorative meal annually on or around Passover with unleavened bread and water only, in contrast to the daily Christian Eucharist. The reliability of Epiphanius's account of Ebionites is questioned by some scholars. Modern scholar Shlomo Pines, for example, argues that the heterodox beliefs and practices he ascribes to some Ebionites originated in Gnostic Christianity rather than Jewish Christianity and are characteristics of the Jewish Elcesaite sect, which Epiphanius mistakenly attributed to Ebionites.

While mainstream biblical scholars do suppose some Essene influence on the nascent Jewish-Christian church in some organizational, administrative and cultic respects, some scholars go beyond that assumption. Regarding Ebionites specifically, a number of scholars have different theories on how Ebionites may have developed from an Essene Jewish messianic sect. Hans-Joachim Schoeps argues that the conversion of some Essenes to Jewish Christianity after the siege of Jerusalem in 70 CE may be the source of some Ebionites adopting Essene beliefs and practices, while some conclude that Essenes did not become Jewish Christians, but still had an influence on Ebionites.

=== On John the Baptist ===
In the Gospel of the Ebionites, as quoted by Epiphanius, John the Baptist and Jesus are portrayed as vegetarians. Epiphanius states that Ebionites had amended "locusts" (Ancient Greek: ἀκρίδες, romanized: akrídes) to "honey cakes" (Ancient Greek: ἐγκρίδες, romanized: enkrídes). This emendation is not found in any other New Testament manuscript or translation, though a different vegetarian reading is found in a late Slavonic version of Josephus' War of the Jews. Pines and other modern scholars propose that Ebionites were projecting their own vegetarianism onto John the Baptist.

The strict vegetarianism of Ebionites may have been a reaction to the cessation of animal sacrifices after the destruction of the Jerusalem Temple in 70 CE and a safeguard against the consumption of unclean meat in a pagan environment. Scholar James Tabor, however, argues that Ebionite disdain for eating meat and the Temple sacrifice of animals is due to their preference for the ideal pre-Flood diet and what they took to be the original form of worship. In this view, Ebionites had an interest in reviving the traditions inspired by pre-Sinai revelation, especially the time from Enoch to Noah, though this view is unattested.

=== On Jesus the Nazarene ===
Most Church Fathers portray Ebionites as holding a functional adoptionist Christology that rejects the belief that Jesus was a divine person (God the Son) at any stage of his earthly life, whether before (pre-existence), during (incarnation), or after it (exaltation), and instead presents him as a righteous human being who, through faithful observance of the Law of Moses, was adopted by God at his baptism to fulfill the role of prophet and Jewish Messiah. Origen (Contra Celsum 5.61) and Eusebius (Historia Ecclesiastica 3.27.3) recognize variations in Christology among Ebionites: a majority did not believe Jesus was born of a virgin, affirming he was the natural son of Joseph and Mary, while a minority believed in the virgin birth, with both groups rejecting belief in the divinity of Jesus. Some later patristic sources, especially Epiphanius, attribute to certain Ebionites a Christology resembling that of the gnostic heresiarch Cerinthus, in which a created heavenly Christ, identified as one of the archangels, descends upon Jesus at his baptism and departs before his passion.

According to most patristic sources, Ebionites held that Jesus's role as the Messiah was to call for repentance, teach proper observance of the Law, and embody covenant faithfulness. Epiphanius alone claims that Ebionites believed Jesus came to abolish animal sacrifices through prophetic proclamation. Many modern scholars infer that Ebionites did not believe Jesus was a cosmic savior-redeemer who suffered and died by crucifixion through intentional self-sacrifice as a liberating atonement from the enslaving powers of sin and death, an undoing of Adam's transgression, or an opening for universal reconciliation. According to this non-atonement reconstruction of Ebionite theology, Jesus was revered as the culminating figure in a long line of true prophets, whose righteous life and martyrial death perfectly exemplified the covenant faithfulness God called Israel to strive for and provided repentant Israelites with a model for imitation. By contrast, Bart D. Ehrman argues that the Ebionites understood Jesus's death as a voluntary, perfect and final sacrifice for the sins of the world, fulfilling God's promises to Israel and rendering animal sacrifices unnecessary.

The Jewish-Christian gospels differ in their treatment of the resurrection of Jesus. The Gospel of the Ebionites seems to end before the Passion of Jesus, leaving its position unclear, while the Gospel of the Hebrews includes an appearance of the risen Jesus to his brother James the Just, and the Gospel of the Nazarenes preserves resurrection stories similar to the Gospel of Matthew. Some modern scholars argue that Ebionites most likely affirmed Jesus's resurrection as vindication of his role as the Messiah and as an end-time sign of the coming universal resurrection of the dead and the annihilation of the wicked, while rejecting Paul’s reinterpretation of the resurrection as God’s confirmation that Jesus's death was a universally atoning sacrifice.

=== On James the Just ===
Some Church Fathers report that the Ebionites, like several other Jewish Christian groups, revered James the Just, brother of Jesus, as the legitimate successor to Jesus and the authoritative leader of the early Jerusalem church, in contrast to later proto-orthodox traditions that emphasized Peter's preeminence. Modern scholarship broadly accepts that James became the central leader of the Jerusalem movement after Jesus's death. The Ascents of James within the Pseudo-Clementine literature is related to Ebionites. Another often-cited connection appears in William Whiston's notes to his 1737 translation of Antiquities of the Jews by Josephus, where he argued from fragments of Hegesippus that Ebionites interpreted the Book of Isaiah as foretelling the martyrdom of James.

Many contemporary scholars reject the once-dominant evolutionary model according to which a "high Christology" emerged only gradually in late Christianity. Instead, a substantial body of scholarship argues that reverence for Jesus as a heavenly, exalted, and in some cases pre-existent figure appeared within the earliest decades of the Christian movement, including in traditions reflected in Paul's letters. Richard Bauckham argues that the Jerusalem church under James already possessed a form of “high Christology,” while the Ebionites represented a later stream of Jewish Christianity that emphasized Jesus's humanity and prophetic role. Bauckham and others therefore distinguish the Ebionites from the Nazarenes, whom they regard as closer continuators of the original Jerusalem church and more accepting of Paul’s mission to Gentiles.

Other scholars challenge this reconstruction and argue for stronger continuity between the Jerusalem church and later Ebionite traditions. Robert Eisenman, Gerd Ludemann, John Painter, Michael Goulder, and James Tabor contend that Ebionite theology may preserve elements of an earlier Jerusalem-centered form of Christianity focused on James as apostolic founder, uncompromising covenant faithfulness, and a more explicitly Jewish understanding of Jesus. In this critical interpretation, portrayals of the Ebionites as merely a late heretical sect reflect retrospective proto-orthodox polemics rather than neutral historical description.

=== On Paul the Apostle ===
Ebionites rejected the Pauline Epistles, and, according to Origen, they viewed Paul as a false apostle and an apostate from the Law. Ebionites may have been spiritual and biological descendants of the "super-apostles" — talented and respected Jewish Christian ministers in favour of mandatory circumcision of converts — who sought to undermine Paul in Galatia and Corinth.

Epiphanius relates that Ebionites opposed Paul, whom they saw as responsible for the idea that Gentile Christians did not have to be circumcised or follow the Law of Moses, and named him an apostate from Judaism. Epiphanius further relates that some Ebionites alleged that Paul was a Greek who converted to Judaism in order to marry the daughter of a High Priest of Israel, but apostatized when she rejected him.

== Writings ==
No writings of Ebionites have survived outside of a few quotes by others and they are in uncertain form. The Recognitions of Clement and the Clementine Homilies, two third century Christian works, are regarded by general scholarly consensus as largely or entirely Jewish Christian in origin and reflect Jewish Christian beliefs. The exact relationship between Ebionites and these writings is debated, but Epiphanius's description of some Ebionites in Panarion 30 bears a striking similarity to the ideas in the Recognitions and Homilies. Scholar Glenn Alan Koch speculates that Epiphanius likely relied upon a version of the Homilies as a source document. Some scholars also speculate that the core of the Gospel of Barnabas, beneath a polemical medieval Muslim overlay, may have been based upon an Ebionite or gnostic document. The existence and origin of this source continues to be debated by scholars.

John Arendzen classifies the Ebionite writings into four groups.

=== Gospel of the Ebionites ===
Irenaeus stated that Ebionites used the Gospel of Matthew exclusively. Eusebius of Caesarea wrote that they used only the Gospel of the Hebrews. From this, the minority view of James R. Edwards and Bodley's Librarian Edward Nicholson claim that there was only one Hebrew gospel in circulation, Matthew's Gospel of the Hebrews. They also note that the title "Gospel of the Ebionites" was never used by anyone in the early church. Epiphanius contended that the gospel Ebionites used was written by Matthew and called the "Gospel of the Hebrews". Because Epiphanius said that it was "not wholly complete, but falsified and mutilated", writers such as Walter Richard Cassels and Pierson Parker consider it a different "edition" of Matthew's Hebrew Gospel; however, internal evidence from the quotations in Panarion 30.13.4 and 30.13.7 suggest that the text was a gospel harmony originally composed in Greek.

Mainstream scholarly texts, such as the standard edition of the New Testament apocrypha edited by Wilhelm Schneemelcher, generally refer to the text Jerome cites as used by Ebionites as the "Gospel of the Ebionites", though this is not a term current in the early church.

=== Clementine literature ===
The collection of New Testament apocrypha known as the Clementine literature included three works known in antiquity as the Circuits of Peter, the Acts of the Apostles and a work usually titled the Ascents of James. They are specifically referenced by Epiphanius in his polemic against Ebionites. The first-named books are substantially contained in the Homilies of Clement under the title of Clement's Compendium of Peter's itinerary sermons and in the Recognitions attributed to Clement. They form an early Christian didactic fiction to express Jewish Christian beliefs, such as the primacy of James the Just, brother of Jesus; their connection with the episcopal see of Rome; and their antagonism to Simon Magus, as well as gnostic doctrines. Scholar Robert E. Van Voorst opines of the Ascents of James (R 1.33–71), "There is, in fact, no section of the Clementine literature about whose origin in Jewish Christianity one may be more certain". Despite this assertion, he expresses reservations that the material is genuinely Ebionite in origin.

=== Symmachus ===
Symmachus produced a translation of the Hebrew Bible in Koine Greek, which was used by Jerome and is still extant in fragments, and his lost Hypomnemata, written to counter the canonical Gospel of Matthew. Although lost, the Hypomnemata is probably identical to De distinctione præceptorum mentioned by Ebed Jesu (Assemani, Bibl. Or., III, 1). The identity of Symmachus as an Ebionite has been questioned in recent scholarship.

=== Elcesaites ===
Hippolytus of Rome reported that a Jewish Christian, Alcibiades of Apamea, appeared in Rome teaching from a book which he claimed to be the revelation which a righteous man, Elchasai, had received from an angel, though Hippolytus suspected that Alcibiades was himself the author. Shortly afterwards, Origen recorded a sect, the Elcesaites, with the same beliefs. Epiphanius claimed Ebionites also used this book as a source for some of their beliefs and practices (Panarion 30.17). Epiphanius explains the origin of the name Elchasai to be Aramaic El Ksai, meaning "hidden power" (Panarion 19.2.1). Scholar Petri Luomanen believes the book to have been written originally in Aramaic as a Jewish apocalypse, probably in Babylonia in 116–117.

== Religious and critical perspectives ==
=== Christianity ===
The mainstream Christian view of Ebionites is partly based on interpretation of the polemical views of the Church Fathers, who portrayed them as heretics for rejecting many of the proto-orthodox Christian beliefs of Jesus and allegedly having an improper fixation on the Law of Moses at the expense of the grace of God. In this view, Ebionites may have been the descendants of a Jewish Christian sect within the early Jerusalem church which broke away from its proto-orthodox theology, possibly in reaction to the Council of Jerusalem compromise of 50 CE.

=== Islam ===
Islam charges Christianity with having distorted the pure monotheism of the God of Abraham through the doctrines of the Trinity and through the veneration of icons. Paul Addae and Tim Bowes write that Ebionites were faithful to the original teachings of the historical Jesus and thus shared the Islamic view of Jesus' humanity and also rejected proto-orthodox theories of atonement. Furthermore, the Islamic view of Jesus is compatible with the view of a minor sect within Ebionites who embraced rather than disputed the virgin birth of Jesus.

Hans Joachim Schoeps observes that the Christianity which Muhammad, the prophet of Islam, was likely to have encountered on the Arabian peninsula "was not the state religion of Byzantium but a schismatic Christianity characterized by Ebionite and Monophysite beliefs":

Thus we have a paradox of world-historical proportions, viz., the fact that Jewish Christianity indeed disappeared within the Christian church, but was preserved in Islam and thereby extended some of its basic ideas even to our own day. According to Islamic doctrine, the Ebionite combination of Moses and Jesus found its fulfillment in Muhammad.

— Hans Joachim Schoeps, Jewish Christianity

Irfan Shahîd, a Palestinian Christian scholar in the field of Oriental studies, counters that there is no evidence that Ebionites remained until the 7th century, much less that they had a presence in Mecca.

=== Judaism ===
The counter-missionary group Jews for Judaism favorably mentions historical Ebionites in their literature in order to argue that "Messianic Judaism", as promoted by missionary groups such as Jews for Jesus, is Pauline Christianity misrepresenting itself as Judaism. In 2007, some Messianic commentators expressed concern over a possible existential crisis for the Messianic movement in Israel due to a resurgence of Ebionitism, specifically the problem of Israeli Messianic leaders apostatizing from the belief in the divinity of Jesus.

== See also ==
- Adoptionism
- Christian–Jewish reconciliation
- Christianity and Judaism
- Christianity in the 1st century
- Cerinthus
- Conversion to Judaism
- Covenantal nomism
- Diversity in early Christian theology
- Early Church of Jerusalem
- Gospel of the Ebionites
- Hebrew Roots
- Heresy in Christianity
- History of Christianity
- Jewish–Christian gospels
- Judaizers
- List of heresies in the Catholic Church
- Nazarenes
- Pauline Christianity
- Proto-orthodox Christianity
- Psilanthropism
- Restorationism

== Bibliography ==
- Akers, Keith (2000). The Lost Religion of Jesus: Simple Living and Nonviolence in Early Christianity. Lantern Books.
- Atkins, J.D. (2019). The Doubt of the Apostles and the Resurrection Faith of the Early Church: The Post-resurrection Appearance Stories of the Gospels in Ancient Reception and Modern Debate. Mohr Siebeck.
- Butz, Jeffrey (2010). The Secret Legacy of Jesus. Inner Traditions. ISBN 978-1-59477-307-5.
- G. Uhlhorn (1894). "Ebionites". In Philip Schaff (ed.). A Religious Encyclopaedia or Dictionary of Biblical, Historical, Doctrinal, and Practical Theology. Vol. 2 (3rd ed.). pp. 684–685.
- Goranson, Stephen (1992). "Ebionites". In D Freedman (ed.). The Anchor Bible Dictionary. Vol. 2. New York: Doubleday. pp. 260–1.
- Gregory, Andrew (2017). The Gospel according to the Hebrews and the Gospel of the Ebionites. New York: Oxford University Press.
- Loke, Andrew Ter Ern (2017), The Origin of Divine Christology, vol. 169, Cambridge University Press, ISBN 978-1108191425
- J. M. Fuller (1999). "Ebionism and Ebionites". In Henry Wace (ed.). A Dictionary of Christian Biography and Literature to the End of the Sixth Century A.D., with an Account of the Principal Sects and Heresies. Hendrickson Publishers. ISBN 1-56563-460-8.
- Wilson, Barrie (2008). How Jesus Became Christian - The early Christians and the transformation of a Jewish teacher into the Son of God. Orion. ISBN 978-0-297-85200-1.
