= Ibn Karram =

Muslim scholar and theologian (806–868)

Muhammad ibn Karram

Personal life
- Born: 190 H/ 806 CE
- Died: 255 H/ 868 CE
- Era: Early Islamic (Abbasid Era)
- Main interest(s): Aqeedah, Hadith
- Notable idea: Iman-Iqrar Equivalence
- Notable work(s): Kitab 'Azab al-Qabr, Kitab al-Tawhid
- Occupation: Scholar of Islam

Religious life
- Religion: Islam
- Denomination: Karramiyya (Note: However, Ibn Taymiyyah did not consider him to have been an anthropomorphist.)
- Jurisprudence: Hanafi

Muslim leader
- Influenced by: Muqatil ibn Sulayman
- Influenced: Ibn Taymiyyah

Abu 'Abd Allah Muhammad ibn Karram al-Sijistani (Arabic: أبو عبد الله محمد بن كَرَّام السجستاني) was an ascetic, hellfire preacher, hadith narrator, and a literalist theologian who founded the Karramiyya sect. His views were considered heretical, schismatic, and abominable by the majority of Sunni scholars. He was accused of holding the doctrine of anthropomorphism, and that his chief theological doctrine was that God is a substance (jawhar) and that he had a body (jism); for which reason his followers were commonly called the "Mujassima" (corporealists) and "Mushabbiha" (anthropomorphists). (Note: The Mujassima (corporealists), as indicated by their name, are those who maintain that God has a body, whose rationalized views on God's corporeality resembled the Stoic ideas of the early Christian theologians. Accordingly, they were literalists: hence the derogatory terms Mushabbiha (anthropomorphists) and Hashwiyya (roughly, "know-nothings") applied to them by the Ash'aris and Maturidis.)

Some sources reported that he was of Arab descent, and his lineage belongs to the Bani Nizar, or Bani Turab (the people or sons of Turab), and according to some, to the Arab tribe of the Banu Nadhir. It has been said that Ibn Taymiyya (d. 728/1328) took inspiration from him.

== Name ==
His name was Abu 'Abd Allah Muhammad ibn Karram ibn 'Arraf (or 'Iraq) ibn Khuraya (or Khizana or Hizaba) ibn al-Bara' al-Sijistani al-Nisapuri.

== Biography ==
He was born in Zaranj in Sijistan, in around 190/806. He traveled to Khurasan and studied with Ahmad b. Harb, Ibrahim b. Yusuf, 'Ali b. Hujr in Marw, and 'Abd Allah b. Malik in Herat. Then he moved to Mecca and stayed there five years. Then he returned back to his home country Sijistan, and went to Nisapur and studied with Ahmed Bin Harb before the local governor Tahir b. 'Abd Allah (230–48/844–62) expelled him, because his teachings caused unrest and strife within society. Then he went to the Levant and returned to Nisapur to preach to the masses. His preaching attracted large crowds. In his speeches, he was opposed and attacked both Sunni and Shi'a theology. For this reason, the Tahirid governor Muhammad b. Tahir b. 'Abd Allah jailed him for eight years. After his release from the jail in 251/865, he traveled to Jerusalem.

Ibn Kathir in al-Bidaya wa al-Nihaya (The Beginning and the End) and Muhammad ibn Ahmad al-Maqdisi (c. 945–991) in Ahsan al-Taqasim fi Ma'rifat al-Aqalim (The Best Divisions for Knowledge of the Regions), both of them confirmed that Ibn Karram preached his controversial views while sitting near the "column of the cradle of Jesus, where many people used to meet him." Due to his views about iman (belief), his books were burned and he was expelled from Jerusalem by the governor to Ramla.

== Books ==
There are several books attributed to Ibn Karram, such as Kitab al-Tawhid (Book of the Unification), and Kitab 'Azab al-Qabr (Book of the Torment of the Grave), but none of them remain today. However, his beliefs are mentioned in a number of tabaqat works (biographical dictionaries) and heresiographical works, including Maqalat al-Islamiyyin (The Ideas of the Muslims) by Abu al-Hasan al-Ash'ari (d. 324/936), Al-Farq bayn al-Firaq (The Difference between the Sects) by 'Abd al-Qahir al-Baghdadi (d. 429/1037), al-Tabsir fi al-Din by Abu al-Muzaffar al-Isfarayini (d. 471/1078), Kitab al-Milal wa al-Nihal (The Book of Religions and Creeds) by Abu al-Fath al-Shahristani (d. 548/1153), and I'tiqadat Firaq al-Muslimin wa al-Mushrikin by Fakhr al-Din al-Razi (d. 606/1210).

== Theological views ==
According to heresiographical works, Ibn Karram is considered one of the Murji'a who held that iman (faith or belief) to be only acknowledgment with the tongue, without the need for recognition by the heart, and confirmation by acts.

He used to say: "Allah is a body unlike bodies" and "Allah is firmly seated on the throne and He is in person on the upper side of it." He and his adherents accepted the materialistic pictures of God found in the Qur'an and tried to understand them in human terms. The followers of Ibn Karram were unsure "whether Allah is as big as his throne, whether it is equal to his breadth." 'Abd al-Qahir al-Baghdadi gave an exhaustive description of their doctrines in al-Farq bayn al-Firaq.

In his book, which is entitled 'Azab al-Qabr (The Punishment of the Grave), he described God as He is high above, localized on the Throne, and that God touches His Throne and that the Throne is a place for Him, and that He is sitting on it. He wrote also that God is a Unit of essence and a Unit of substance, had a body with flesh, blood, and limbs, and had direction and so could move from one point to another. He affirmed the beatific vision (seeing God in the hereafter) without securing the doctrine against its potential spatial implications. (Note: The Qur'an states that God will be seen in Paradise in person, which mentioned in Surat al-Qiyama (75:22-23): "Some faces on that Day will be radiant (with contentment), looking towards their Lord". The seeing God in the afterlife became a pillar of the Ash'ari and the Maturidi schools. But the Nature, Perfection, and Attributes of God being all infinite, and exalted above comprehension or encompassing, and the Understanding of Man not only finite, but also of small Extent. According to the Ash'aris and the Maturidis, God will be seen in the Hereafter by the believers, but with the rule of Bila Kayf ("without considering how and without comparison").)

== Scholarly views on him ==
Although he claimed to be a follower of Abu Hanifa, his theological views were criticized by the Hanafis, such as Abu Bakr al-Samarqandi (d. 268/881–2), al-Hakim al-Samarqandi (d. 342/953), Abu al-Yusr al-Bazdawi (d. 482/1089), Abu al-Mu'in al-Nasafi (d. 508/1114), and al-Saffar al-Bukhari (d. 534/1139).

He was accused of being a fabricator of Hadith by several scholars, including Ibn Hibban (d. 354/ 965), al-Dhahabi (d. 748/1348), Ibn Kathir (d. 774/1373), and Ibn Hajar al-'Asqalani (d. 852/1449), all of them confirmed that the reporting of Ibn Karram is unreliable, because he is a fabricator.

Salah al-Din al-Safadi (d. 764/1363) in his work, entitled: Al-Wafi bi al-Wafayat (Arabic: الوافي بالوفيات, lit. 'The Complement to the Deaths'), described him as a deviant and misguided anthropomorphist, and he said that Ibn Karram was praised by Ibn Khuzayma (d. 311/923) and met him more than once.

Ibn Taymiyya (d. 728/1328) in his book Sharh al-'Aqida al-Asfahaniyya (Arabic: شرح العقيدة الأصفهانية) defended him, as he stated in his own words:

Sharh al-'Aqida al-Isfahaniyya

Abu 'Abd Allah Muhammad ibn Karram was also raised up in Sijistan and its aspects, supporting the doctrine of Ahl al-Sunna wa al-Jama'a (the Sunnis), the affirmers of God's attributes, the Qadr (predestination, fate, or the divine destiny) and love of the Sahaba (the Companions of the Prophet Muhammad) and so on, and countering/responding to the Jahmiyya, the Mu'tazila, the Rafida (refusers, rejectionists or defectors; often used as a derogatory term for Shi'ites) and others, and agreed with them on the basis of their articles in which they said what they said, and disagreed with them in their requirements, as Ibn Kullab and al-Ash'ari disagreed with them, but those are affiliated with the Sunna and Hadith, while Ibn Karram is affiliated with the doctrine of the Ahl al-Ra'y (people of reasoned opinion, often referring to the Hanafis).

وقام أيضاً أبو عبد الله محمد بن كَرَّام بسجستان ونواحيها ينصر مذهب أهل السنة والجماعة، والمثبتة للصفات والقدر وحب الصحابة وغير ذلك، ويرد على الجهمية والمعتزلة والرافضة وغيرهم، ويوافقهم على أصول مقالاتهم التي بها قالوا ما قالوا، ويخالفهم في لوازمها، كما خالفهم ابن كلاب والأشعري، لكن هؤلاء منتسبون إلى السنة والحديث، وابن كرام منتسب إلى مذهب أهل الرأي

— Ibn Taymiyya, "Sharh al-'Aqida al-Isfahaniyya". p. 378.

== Death ==
He died in Bayt al-Maqdis (Jerusalem) in Safar in the year 255 AH/869 CE, and was buried at Bab Ariha (Gate of Jericho).

== See also ==
- Muqatil ibn Sulayman
- Hisham ibn al-Hakam
