= Clementine literature =

Category of Christian religious romance

The Clementine literature (also referred to as the Clementine Romance or Pseudo-Clementine Writings) is a late antique third-century Christian romance containing an account of the conversion of Clement of Rome to Christianity, his subsequent life and travels with the apostle Peter and an account of how they became traveling companions, Peter's discourses, and finally Clement's family history and eventual reunion with his family. To reflect the pseudonymous nature of the authorship, the author is sometimes referred to as Pseudo-Clement. In all likelihood, the original text went by the name of Periodoi Petrou ("Circuits of Peter"); sometimes historians refer to it as the "Grundschrift" ("Basic Writing").

Though lost, the original survives in two recensions known as the Clementine Homilies and the Clementine Recognitions. The overlap between the two has been used to produce a provisional reconstruction of the Circuits of Peter. Respectively, the original titles for these two texts were the Klementia and the Recognitions of the Roman Clement. Both were composed in the fourth-century. In turn, there was plausibly a second-century document (referred to as the Kerygmata Petrou ("Preaching of Peter")) that was used as a source for the original Clementine literature text. The Kerygma is thought to consist of a letter from Peter to James, lectures and debates of Peter, and James's testimony about the letters recipients.

Some believe that the original was lost due to the substantially greater popularity of its recensions in the Homilies and Recognitions. These were so popular that translations and recensions of them appeared in Syriac, Greek, Latin, Ethiopic, Arabic, Slavonic, and Georgian. Vernacular versions also appeared in Icelandic, Old Swedish, Middle High German, Early South English, and Anglo-Norman.

== Overview ==
Two versions of this romance have survived:

- Clementine Homilies (H), consisting of the Epistle of Peter, the Adjuration (also called Contestation) and finally the Epistle of Clement, all followed by twenty numbered books. The books are each called a "Homily", but more accurately, they are theological-philosophical dialogues.
- Clementine Recognitions (R), for which the original Greek has been lost but exists in a Latin translation produced by Rufinus of Aquileia in 406.

Quotations of the original are also available from the writings of Origen, the Apostolic Constitutions of Epiphanius, the Chronicon Paschale, and possibly, the Cave of Treasures and the writings of Lactantius.

Two later epitomes of the Homilies also exist, and there is a partial Syriac translation, which includes passages from both the Recognitions (specifically books 1–3), and the Homilies (books 10–14), preserved in two Syriac British Library manuscripts, one of which was written in the year 411. Fragments of the Clementine literature are also known in Arabic, Classical Armenian, and Old Church Slavonic. Though H and R largely correspond in wording and content, and have a similar length and framework, there is material that is distinctive to both.

It is now almost universally held that H and R are two versions of an original and longer Clementine romance that largely covered the content in the extant versions.

== Law ==
Gentile and Jewish law is an important focus of the Clementine literature. It sharpens the divide between the two forms of these laws as was earlier witnessed in the canonical Acts of the Apostles. Jews need to follow all of the Law of Moses described in the Torah (though they are not discussed in detail) whereas gentiles need to follow the teachings of Jesus. However, unlike previous writings which comment on gentile and Jewish law, the Clementine literature goes further insofar as it holds the position that Jews do not need Jesus to attain salvation; in turn, gentiles do not need the Law of Moses either. Hence, the text endorses an ethnic separation between Jews and gentiles. The Homilies even say that a pagan might be saved through temperance and virtue (13.20.2). For the Clementine literature, Mosaic law has an ongoing validity despite what it believes to have been some partial level of corruption after it was composed. In addition, gentiles are subject to attacks by demons if they fail to follow gentile law as modelled off of the Decrees of the Apostles. Jesus, whose purpose was to save the gentiles, is himself said to confirm the Law, but also abrogate parts of it that were erroneously added. Beyond the stipulations of the Decree of the Apostles, it is also stipulated that one must wash after sexual intercourse and perhaps before prayer. Pigs and wine are associated with demons.

== Christology and prophetology ==
In the Homilies, all prophets are instantiations of the same pre-existent divine being, but in different bodies. Only the last one of these, Jesus, is the Messiah. The Recognitions also state that the heavenly pre-existent Jesus "took a Jewish body and was born among the Jews." This idea is likely to have originated from the Book of Elchasai written in the early second century, where all prophets are incarnations of the same pre-existent Christ in different bodies, all bearing the same message, but again only the last of them being the Messiah. In turn, the Elchasaites thought that the pre-existent Christ was the first angel, created by God.

The prophets serve as an important conduit by which the Pseudo-Clementine describes its christology. In particular, seven prophets from the Torah are repeatedly mentioned as ideal figures, whose authority is accepted: Adam, Enoch, Noah, Abraham, Isaac, Jacob, Moses. Other figures are not included. For example, John the Baptist (Homilies 2.23) is portrayed negatively as the teacher of Simon Magus, who in turn is the arch-villain of the novel. Ebionite influence at some point made Simon Magnus represent the Apostle Paul, whom the Ebionites hated. This influence is stronger in the Homilies than in the Recognitions. The view of these prophets is very high, as the sins they are described as having committed in the Old Testament are denied. More importantly, these prophets, who are called "the seven pillars of the world", are actually forms by which the pre-existent Jesus himself appeared. Jesus also appeared to these prophets. The Clementine literature also describes Jesus in a way that contrasts starkly with his portrayal in other extant sources. It says little of his life, crucifixion or resurrection. Jesus is frequently designated as the "True Prophet". And although the True Prophet is "full of divinity" and is the "son of God", he himself is not God "nor did he proclaim himself that he was God".

== Cosmology ==
The Clementine literature speaks of cosmology, including in section 1.27–71 of the Syriac version. In so doing, it primarily follows the Genesis creation narrative: God creates the heavens and the Earth; creates the firmament to divide the heavenly waters into the upper and lower waters; partitions the cosmos into one abode for angels and another abode for humans; creates a separation between dry land and the seas; then creates mountains, rivers, springs, and other structures to provide a suitable living space for humans; adorns the heavens with stars; creates the sun and moon to provide light and to follow one another; creates living things which culminates in the making of man. The firmament is said to be made of solid ice occupying the space between the Earth and the first heaven. Furthermore, the Clementine literature describes the sun and moon as "indicators" insofar as they constitute signs (as opposed to causes) of the events to come on Earth. This coincides with the views of the church father Origen. Furthermore, Abraham is depicted as an astrologer who teaches astrology to the Egyptian kings.

The Clementine literature occasionally describes the cosmology of pagans. Two parallel episodes occur in the Recognitions, 10:17 and 10:30, which describes a myth analogous to the cosmic egg in association with traditions attached to Orpheus: there is first a primordial chaos which, over time, solidified into an egg. As is with an egg, a creature began to grow inside, until at some point it broke open to produce a human that was both male and female (i.e. androgynous) named Phanetas. When Phanetas appeared, a light shone forth that resulted in "subsance, prudence, motion, and coition," and these in turn resulted in the creation of the heavens and the earth. In the first account, the description of the myth is attributed to Clement, who finds it to be ridiculous. In the second account, it is described in a serious manner by a "good pagan" named Nicetas.

== Scholarly interpretations ==
Historian Paula Fredriksen treats the Celementine literature as evidence for an alternative strand of Christianity that maintained a positive relationship with Jewish law and practice. She bases this interpretation on the observation that, in this literature, Paul is never mentioned by name and may be referred to obliquely as Peter's "enemy", and that Jesus is presented as a prophet in a line stretching from Moses, and salvation is depicted as coming through Moses for Jews and through Jesus for gentiles, with each path considered legitimate. She also notes that the word "Christian" does not appear in reference to gentile Christ-followers, who are instead called "God-fearers". She reads this literature as showing that law-observant, Jewishly oriented forms of Christianity persisted well into the imperial period, despite being denounced as heretical by Church Fathers such as Eusebius and Epiphanius.

== Redactional history ==
A substantial part of the first book of R (chs. 27–71) differs from the form and content of the rest of the work and appears to involve the addition of at least three originally distinct works:

- A creation account and history of Israel terminating with the coming of Jesus (chs. 27–42).
- A treatise dealing with the question of whether Jesus should be understood as "the eternal Christ", and discusses his priestly and salvatory role (chs. 44–52). This contains material similar to the Epistle to the Hebrews and the First Epistle to the Thessalonians.
- A section which may correspond to material in the Ascents of James according to Epiphanius of Salamis (chs. 53–71).

Fred Lapham concludes that with "so complicated a process of transmission and redaction as these several documents present" it would be unwise to draw any conclusions about the date and origins of the Clementine literature — although he does offer a tentative theory. "It is more than likely that a collection of Petrine teachings, and a book of Peter's journey, independently circulated in the Palestinian and Syrian regions during the early second century, and were brought together to form the base document of the Homilies."

== Date ==
Scholarly hypotheses have placed the date of the Clementine Recognitions and Homilies between the second and fourth centuries. The earliest manuscripts, composed in the Syriac language, are from the fifth century. In 406, Tyrannius Rufinus produced a translation of the text from Greek into Latin. For these reasons, the present consensus places these texts in the mid-fourth century, originating perhaps in Syria.

An entry on the Clementine literature in the Catholic Encyclopedia provides an extensive overview of the literature on the date of these texts up until 1908, when the entry was originally written.

== Reception and influence ==
The earliest witness to the Clementine literature is found in the works of Eusebius:

And now some have only the other day brought forward other wordy and lengthy compositions as being Clement's, containing dialogues of Peter and Appion, of which there is absolutely no mention in the ancients. Ecclesiastical History, 3.38

Next we find the Clementines used by Ebionites c. 360. They are quoted as the Periodi by St. Jerome in 387 and 392 (On Galatians 1:18, and Adv. Jovin., 1:26). Around 408, Paulinus of Nola in a letter to Rufinus mentions having himself translated a part or all, perhaps as an exercise in Greek. The Opus imperfectum above mentioned has five quotations. It is apparently by an Arian of the beginning of the 5th century, possibly by a bishop called Maximus.

=== Translations ===
==== Syriac ====
The Syriac recension combines text from the Recognitions and Homilies: the first part corresponds to Recognitions 1–3, whereas the second part corresponds to Homilies 10–14, although into this second section the editor occasionally imports phrases and clauses from Recognitions 7. In addition, Homilies 12.25–33 is omitted, and instead of Homilies 13, picks up at Recognitions 7.25–32 before resuming to Homilies 13.8.1. The editor not only mixed portions of the two texts, which were both available to him, but also at times summarized the text especially when differences existed between the accounts.

The Syriac recension of the Clementine literature had already been composed in the early fifth century at the latest, as one Syriac language manuscript (Brit. Libr. Add. 12,150) containing substantial portions of the text already appears in 411. The Syriac translation of the Recognitions was also known to Ephrem the Syrian in his Commentary on the Diatessaron from 373, and so it must predate this time as well. Another Syriac manuscript (Brit. Libr. Add. 14,609) containing an entirely independent translation of it then appears again in the 6th century. The Apostolic Constitutions also found their way into the Octateuch of Clement which was translated into Syriac in the 7th century. Eastern Christian tradition was widely influenced by the Syriac version of this text. These Syriac manuscripts provide a witness to the text of the Pseudo-Clementines over half a millennium older than the oldest extant Greek manuscripts.

==== Latin ====
C. 400, the monk and theologian Rufinus also translated both texts of the Clementine literature into Latin. This translation is the primary strand by which the Recognitions have survived today.

==== Arabic and Ge'ez ====
Translations were also made into Ge'ez and Arabic.

=== Quran ===
Holger Zellentin has studied the intertextuality of the Quran vis-a-vis the Clementine literature in the field of Quranic studies. Insofar as the Judeo-Christian group as described according to the Didascalia Apostolorum can be corroborated in the Clementine literature, such practices are also found in the Quran. Nevertheless, despite the congruences, the Quran is not to be framed within a notion of a Jewish Christianity but within broader late antique Christian discourses which encapsulated these ideas.

- According to the Quran, jinn are created from fire. The Clementine literature claims that there are various classes of angels and that the lowest class of them mixed with humans; upon doing so and becoming accustomed to their sinful lifestyles, they were transformed into fire and flesh (Pseudo-Clementines, 8:13).
- Both the Clementine literature and the Quran forbid consumption of carrion (dead carcasses), animals eaten or mangled by other animals, and divided meat. The Quran appears to continue the trend found earlier in the Clementine literature of providing increasingly specific dietary restrictions.
- Both propound the notion of purification, including maintaining ritual purity by abstaining from sex with a woman until after they complete their cycle of menstruation.
- Despite their long list of purity laws, both remain silent on the question of circumcision. In addition, both texts only consider Shabbat incumbent on Jews, but not on gentiles.

=== Modern times ===
William Gaddis's first novel The Recognitions takes its name, and inspiration, from these works. While writing a short parody of Faust in 1948, Gaddis read James Frazer's The Golden Bough, where he learned that Goethe's plot for Faust was derived from the Clementine Recognitions. Gaddis noted that this first Christian novel was a work that posed as one having been written by a disciple of St. Peter. Thus it was an original work posed as something else, in some sense a fraud, became a source for the Faust legend. From this point, Gaddis began to expand his work on Faust as a full novel.

== See also ==
- Pseudo-Dionysius the Areopagite

== Editions ==
- The Pseudo-Clementines (3rd–4th cen. AD). Trans. A. Roberts and J. Donaldson in Ante-Nicene Fathers, Eerdmans 1978.
- In 2014, F. Stanley Jones published an English translation of the Syriac recension of the Pseudo-Clementine literature.
