= Ascents of James =

2nd-century Christian text

The Ascents of James (Greek: Anabathmoi Iacobou) is the title of a lost work briefly described in a heresiology known as the Panarion (30.16.6–9), (Note: Bauckham 2003, p. 164; Bauckham limits the identification of the work Epiphanius calls the Ascents of James to Pan. 30.16.7.) by Epiphanius of Salamis; it was used as a source for a polemic against a Jewish Christian sect known as the Ebionites. The document advocated the abolition of the Jewish sacrifices, esteemed James, the brother of Jesus as the leader of the Jerusalem church, and denigrated Paul of Tarsus as a Gentile and an opponent of Jewish Law.

A Jewish Christian source document thought to be embedded within the Pseudo-Clementine Recognitions (1.27 or 1.33–71) (Note: Bauckham 2003, p. 164; according to Jones 1998, p. 147, the source document extends from 1.27–71; according to Van Voorst 1989, p. 45, it extends from 1.33.3–71.5.) and conventionally referred to by modern scholars as the Ascents of James may be related to the otherwise lost work mentioned by Epiphanius. (Note: Bauckham 2003, pp. 164–5 and Van Voorst 1989, pp. 45–6 adopt the convention Ascents of James to refer to the Clementine source, whereas Jones 1998, pp. 147–8 rejects the assignment. The relationship between the two documents, if any, remains uncertain.) Distinguishing features of the text include an advocacy for the observance of Mosaic Law and the elimination of the Jewish sacrifices. Paul is portrayed as a "certain hostile person" who prevents James from converting the Jewish people to Christianity (1.70.1–8). The text recounts the salvation history of Israel from Abraham to Jesus from a Jewish Christian perspective. Jesus is depicted as the anticipated prophet-like Moses who was sent by God to complete the work of Moses by abolishing the sacrifices in order to redeem Israel.

== Sources ==
- Bauckham, Richard (2003). "The Origin of the Ebionites". In Tomson, Peter J.; Lambers-Petry, Doris (eds.). The Image of the Judeo-Christians in Ancient Jewish and Christian Literature. Brill. pp. 162–81. ISBN 978-3-16-148094-2.
- Jones, F. Stanley (1998) [1995]. An Ancient Jewish Christian Source on the History of Christianity: Pseudo-Clementine Recognitions 1.27–71. Scholars Press/SBL. ISBN 978-0-7885-0450-1.
- Van Voorst, Robert E. (1989). The Ascents of James: History and Theology of a Jewish–Christian Community. Scholars Press/SBL. ISBN 978-1-55540-293-8.
- Van Voorst, Robert E. (2000). "James, Ascents of". In Freedman, David Noel; Myers, Allen C.; Beck, Astrid B. (eds.). Eerdman's Dictionary of the Bible. Wm. B. Eerdmans Publishing. p. 670. ISBN 978-0-8028-2400-4.
