= Book of Elchasai =

Lost prophetic book, written during the reign of Trajan

The Book of Elchasai or the Book of Elxai is a lost prophetic book, written during the reign of Trajan (reigned 98–117), that contained laws and apocalyptic prophecies pertaining to Jewish Christian and Gnostic doctrines. It is known only from fragments quoted in the early Christian writings of Hippolytus of Rome, Eusebius, Epiphanius of Salamis, and Origen. The book was used by a number of Transjordanian sects, including Ebionites, Essenes, Nazarenes, and especially by Elcesaites who based their origins on it. (Note: Luomanen highlights the later adoption of the book by Ebionites as evidence that the book contained teachings favorable to the Ebionites, and further argues that their adoption of the book marks a distinct separation from Judaism.)

== Content ==
According to Hippolytus's Refutation of All Heresies, the Book of Elchasai was the source of a number of Elcesaite beliefs and practices. It encourages following the Law (including circumcision), as well as ascetic practices. Sexual desire is presented as wickedness, but a sin that could be cured through baptism. The book uses numbers and measures to foretell the future and further advocates healing rituals, as well as following a schedule based on astrology. The universe is held to be governed by principles created by God, who is called "the great and most high God". God's son (Christ, also called "the mighty king") along with the Holy Spirit (who is a female entity) are depicted as angels of enormous size. Christ is held to have lived on earth repeatedly through reincarnation, sometimes arriving through virgin births. Seven witnesses are called to confirm the teachings of Elchasai. (Note: The seven witnesses are identified as heaven, water, the holy spirits (plural), the angels of prayer, oil, salt, and earth.) The book is also apocalyptic, expatiating on an impending crisis. It condemns sacrifices and rejects the eating of meat.

== History ==
The Book of Elchasai was written around the Parthian War of 114–117 AD in Aramaic by a Mesopotamian Jew. The purpose of the book may have been to bring comfort to Jews surviving the massacre during the war. The book describes angelic beings of "stupendous" size and their announcement of universal destruction. These beings revealed the requirements which would allow absolution on the judgment day. Similar enormous angels are also described in 3 Enoch such as Metatron, but Elchasai is particularly describing Christ and the Holy Spirit. The book contains a prediction of a war among wicked angels. Over hundred years later, a Hellenistic version of this manuscript was used by Syrian Judeo-Christians. Epiphanius considered this book heretical.

Alcibiades of Apamea was described by Hippolytus as a "strange demon" having possession of this book. Hippolytus argued against Alcibiades' claims that the book was "a secret writing" and those who listened to the message of the book would receive remission of all their sins.

== Ibn al-Nadim ==
Elchasai is considered to be a historical figure by some. The Kitāb al-Fihrist references a manuscript, written by Muslim scholar Ibn al-Nadim in which he identifies Elchasai instituting the Babylonian baptists sect of Mughtasilah (practitioners of ablution) or katharioi. One of the followers of Elchasai was Mani, who joined Elchasai when he was only four years old by his father who was a convert to the Mughtasilah sect. Mani went on to form his own Gnostic sect known as the Manicheans.

== Bibliography ==
- Aune, David Edward (2003). The Westminster Dictionary of New Testament and Early Christian Literature and Rhetoric. Westminster John Knox Press. p. 145. ISBN 9780664219178.
- Broadhead, Edwin Keith (2010). Jewish Ways of Following Jesus: Redrawing the Religious Map of Antiquity. Mohr Siebeck. pp. 214, 215. ISBN 9783161503047.
- Klijn, A.F.J.; Reinink, G.J. (1974). "Elchasai and Mani". Vigiliae Christianae. 28 (1–4): 277–289. doi:10.1163/157007275x00240. JSTOR 1583233.
- Joseph, Simon J. (2016). "The Jewish Christian Rejection of Animal Sacrifice". Jesus and the temple: the crucifixion in its Jewish context. Cambridge University Press. pp. 178–179. doi:10.1017/CBO9781316408933.007. ISBN 978-1-107-12535-3.
- Luomanen, Petri (2011). Recovering Jewish-Christian Sects and Gospels. BRILL. pp. 42–44, 49. ISBN 9789004217430.
- Luttikhuizen, Gerard P. (1987). "The Book of Elchasai: a Jewish Apocalypse" (PDF). Aula Orientalis. 5: 101–6.
- Luttikhuizen, Gerard P. (2006). Gnostic Revisions of Genesis Stories And Early Jesus Traditions. BRILL. ISBN 9789004145108.
- Schäfer, Peter (2011). The Origins of Jewish Mysticism. Princeton University Press. pp. 313, 315. ISBN 9780691142159.
- Yuri, Stoyanov (2000). The Other God: Dualist Religions from Antiquity to the Cathar Heresy. Yale University Press. p. 102. ISBN 9780300082531.
