= Ibn Mu'adh (disambiguation) =

Ibn Mu'adh, meaning the son of Mu'adh, may refer to:

- Sa'd ibn Mu'adh: a companion of the Islamic prophet Muhammad.
- Ibn Muʿādh al-Jayyānī
- Yahya ibn Mu'adh al-Razi
