= Elkasai =

Religious leader

Elkesai (also known as Elkasai, Elksai, Elchasai and Elxai) was a religious leader and prophet who is believed to have lived in the late 1st century CE and early 2nd century CE. He is primarily known through references in Christian, Manichaean, and other religious texts. Elkesai is associated with a religious movement known as the Elkesaites or Elkesaians, generally considered the founder of Elkesaism, which had significant influence on early Christian Gnostic and heterodox communities.

== Life and teachings ==
Little is known about the life of Elkesai, and much of what is known comes from secondary sources that mention him and his teachings. His religion (Elkesaism) appears to have emerged in the region of Mesopotamia. The primary source of information about Elkesai is the account of Hippolytus of Rome, a 3rd-century Christian theologian, who describes Elkesai as a prophet who claimed to have received a new revelation from an angel, argued to be Jesus Christ. This revelation was contained in a book called the "Book of Elkesai" (also known as "Apocalypse of Elchasai"), which included teachings on baptism, dietary laws, and esoteric knowledge.

Mani was viewed by Manichaens as a reformer of the sect of Elkasai.
