= Ahmad ibn Harb =

Ahmad ibn Harb al-Nisaburi was a noted ascetic of Nishapur, a reliable traditionist and a fighter in the holy wars. He visited Baghdad in the time of Ahmad ibn Hanbal and taught there; he died in Islamic golden age 234 (849) at the age of 85. He was a teacher of Karram (d. 255/869), who was the founder of the anthropomorphic Karramiyya movement.
