= Collyridianism =

Ancient group alleged to have worshipped Mary, mother of Jesus, as a goddess

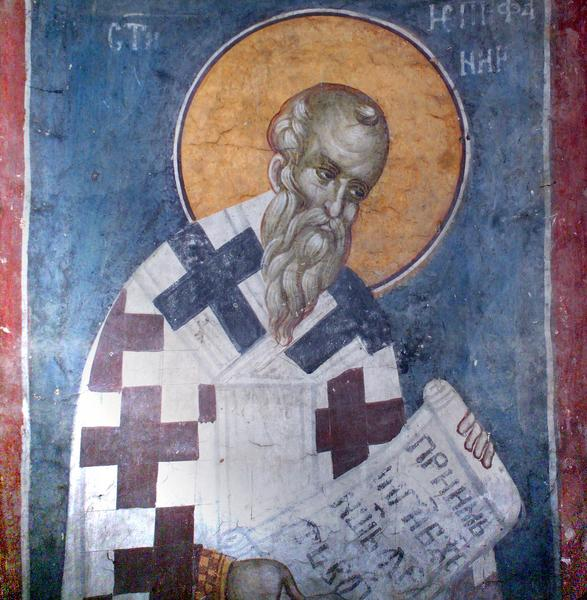
Epiphanius of Salamis (church father, ca. 310–20 – 403), fresco at Gracanica monastery, near Lipljan in Kosovo

Collyridianism (or Kollyridianism) is an alleged Christian heresy whose adherents are described as having worshiped Mary, the mother of Jesus, as a goddess.

The existence of the Collyridians is doubtful: they are only mentioned in the Panarion of Epiphanius and possibly in the Quran. According to Epiphanius, this sect originated in Thrace and Scythia before spreading to Arabia, although origins in Syria or Asia Minor have also been suggested, and was supposedly composed entirely of women. The name comes from the Greek term collyris (Greek: κολλυρίς), referring to the "baked cakes" Epiphanius claimed were offerings to Mary.

== Existence ==
The existence of this sect is seen as doubtful by many scholars. The theologian Karl Gerok strongly disputed the existence of the Collyridians, describing it as improbable that a sect composed only of women could have lasted for as long as described by Epiphanius. Likewise, the problem with the only source for the existence of this sect being a heresiographical tractate by Epiphanius has been seen by Samuel Zwemer and Averil Cameron as reason to doubt that this movement ever existed.

== In the Quran ==
The Quran occasionally refers to Mary being taken as a goddess by Christians in Surah 5 (5:73, 5:75, 5:116). Some have connected these references to the Collyridian sect.

However, research in Quranic studies suggests that "the Quranic accusations that Christians claim Mary as God can be understood as a rhetorical statement." For example, David Thomas states that verse 5:116 need not be seen as describing actually professed beliefs but rather as giving examples of shirk (claiming divinity for beings other than God) and a "warning against excessive devotion to Jesus and extravagant veneration of Mary, a reminder linked to the central theme of the Qur'an that there is only one God and He alone is to be worshipped." Similarly, Gabriel Said Reynolds, Sidney Griffith and Mun'im Sirry argue that the verse is to be understood as a rhetorical statement to warn against the dangers of deifying Jesus or Mary.
