= Ancoratus =

Catechetical work by Epiphanius of Salamis

The Ancoratus is a catechetical work by Epiphanius of Salamis that examines some dogmatic themes in light of the heresies of the fourth century. He does not devote much space to developing heretical doctrines or their confutation as in the Panarion, but he explains the Christian dogma from Bible and tradition.

This work also includes two professions of faith. One of them composed by Epiphanius himself and the other is the one normally used at that time during the rite of baptism by the church of Salamis. It was later adopted by the Council of Constantinople in 381.
