= Fire and brimstone =

Expression referring to God's wrath

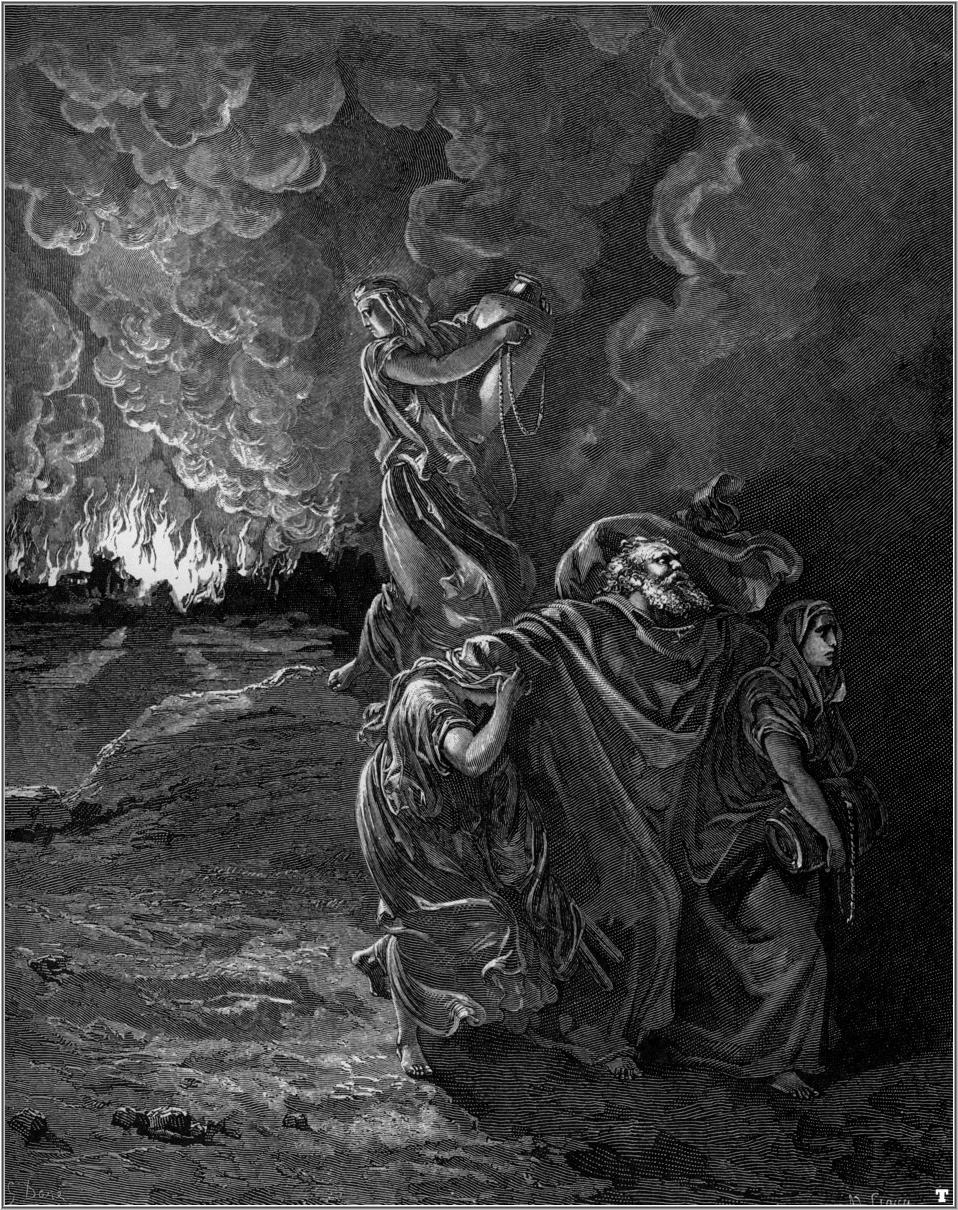
Lot and his family flee from Sodom, one of Gustave Doré's illustrations for La Grande Bible de Tours.

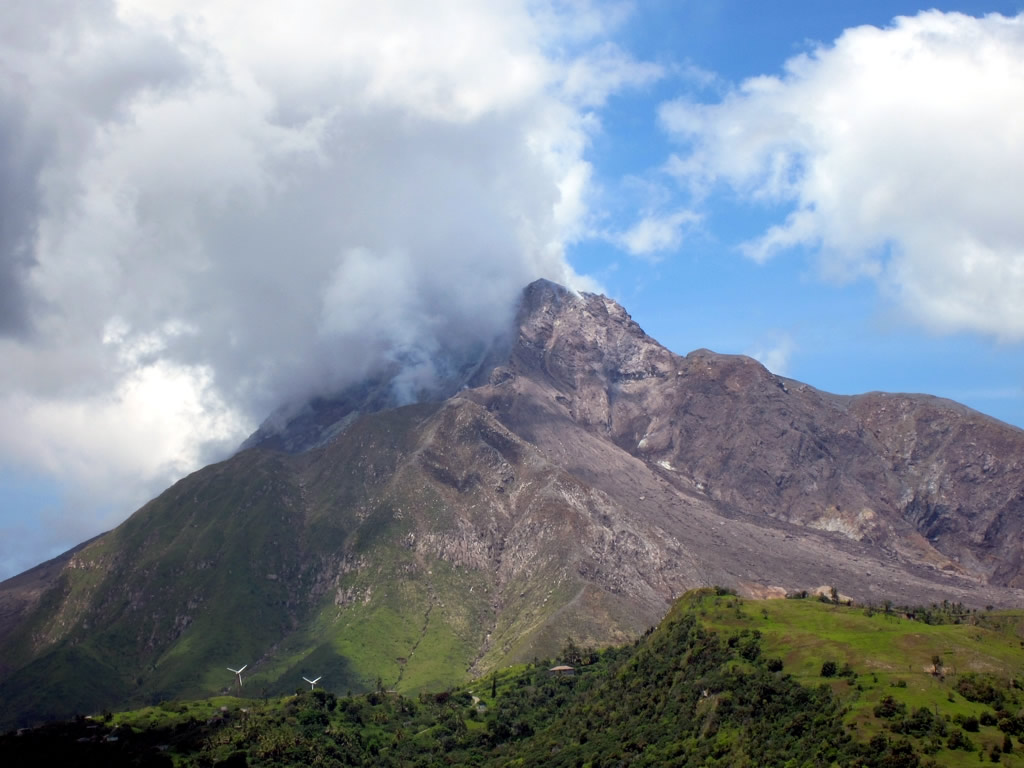
Steam and gas rising from a volcano, which the phrase "fire and brimstone" is intended to evoke.

Fire and brimstone (Biblical Hebrew: גָּפְרִית וָאֵשׁ gofrīt wāʾēš; Ancient Greek: πῦρ καὶ θεῖον) is an idiomatic expression referring to God's wrath found in both the Old and New Testaments. In the Bible, it often appears in reference to the fate of the unfaithful. Brimstone, an archaic term for sulfur, evokes the acrid odor of sulfur dioxide, which is stated to be given off by lightning strikes. The association of sulfur with divine retribution is common in the Bible.

The English translation "fire and brimstone" is found in the 1611 Christian King James Version of the Old Testament and also in the 1917 translation of the Jewish Publication Society. The 1857 Leeser translation of the Tanakh inconsistently uses both "sulfur" and "brimstone" to translate גָּפְרִ֣ית וָאֵ֑שׁ. The translation used by the 1985 New JPS is "sulfurous fire" while the 1978 Christian New International Version translation uses "burning sulfur."

Used as an adjective, fire-and-brimstone often refers to a style of Christian preaching that uses vivid descriptions of judgment and eternal damnation to encourage repentance especially popular during historical periods of Great Awakening.

== Etymology ==
According to Strong's Concordance, the term translated as "brimstone", the Hebrew gofrīt, is the adjectival form of gōfer (גֹפֶר), which is used earlier in the Hebrew Bible to denote the wood which was used to build Noah's Ark. In this view, the term would not denote sulfur, but instead, some sort of derivative of the wood or its tree, which was presumably flammable. Strong concludes that gofrīt must therefore refer to the plant's resin, as resin's flammable nature was both known and widely exploited during ancient times.

The Septuagint translates the Hebrew term as theîon (θεῖον), a word which shares the root of the verb thumiáō (θυμιάω), which means "to burn, to smoke". This unambiguously refers to sulfur, as Pliny the Elder writes that the substance was widely used as a fumigant, medicine, and bleaching agent. Compounding this, the Targum Jonathan translates the Hebrew gofrīt as kīvrētāʾ (Aramaic: כִּבְרֵיתָא), a term used several times in the Talmud for a substance which was used to bleach clothing.

== References in the Old Testament ==
The Old Testament uses the phrase "fire and brimstone" in the context of divine punishment and purification. In Genesis 19, God destroys Sodom and Gomorrah with a rain of fire and brimstone (Hebrew: גׇּפְרִ֣ית וָאֵ֑שׁ), and in Deuteronomy 29, the Israelites are warned that the same punishment would fall upon them should they abandon their covenant with God. Elsewhere, divine judgments involving fire and sulfur are prophesied against Assyria (Isaiah 30), Edom (Isaiah 34), Gog (Ezekiel 38), and all the wicked (Psalm 11).

The breath of God, in Isaiah 30:33, is compared to brimstone: "The breath of Yahweh, like a stream of brimstone, doth kindle it."

English translations of verses mentioning brimstone in the Tanakh (1917 JPS)
Location	Text
Genesis 19:24	Then the LORD caused to rain upon Sodom and upon Gomorrah brimstone and fire from the LORD out of heaven;
Deuteronomy 29:23	...and that the whole land thereof is brimstone, and salt, and a burning, that it is not sown, nor beareth, nor any grass groweth therein, like the overthrow of Sodom and Gomorrah, Admah and Zeboiim, which the Lord overthrew in His anger, and in His wrath;
Isaiah 30:33	For a hearth is ordered of old; Yea, for the king it is prepared, Deep and large; The pile thereof is fire and much wood; The breath of the Lord, like a stream of brimstone, doth kindle it.
Isaiah 34:9	And the streams thereof shall be turned into pitch, And the dust thereof into brimstone, And the land thereof shall become burning pitch.
Ezekiel 38:22	And I will plead against him with pestilence and with blood; and I will cause to rain upon him, and upon his bands, and upon the many peoples that are with him, an overflowing shower, and great hailstones fire, and brimstone.
Psalm 11:6	Upon the wicked He will cause to rain coals; Fire and brimstone and burning wind shall be the portion of their cup.
Job 18:15	There shall dwell in his tent that which is none of his; Brimstone shall be scattered upon his habitation.

== In Christianity ==
Fire and brimstone frequently appear as agents of divine wrath throughout the Christian Book of Revelation culminating in chapters 19–21, wherein Satan and the ungodly are cast into a lake of fire burning with brimstone (Greek: λίμνην τοῦ πυρὸς τῆς καιομένης ἐν θείῳ, limnēn tou pyros tēs kaiomenēs en theiō). The fire that appears in such passages is "eternal," unlike the bodies or souls of people.

English translations of verses mentioning brimstone in Christian New Testament (KJV)
Location	Text
Luke 17:29	But the same day that Lot went out of Sodom it rained fire and brimstone from heaven, and destroyed them all.
Revelation 9:17	And thus I saw the horses in the vision, and them that sat on them, having breastplates of fire, and of jacinth, and brimstone: and the heads of the horses were as the heads of lions; and out of their mouths issued fire and smoke and brimstone.
Revelation 9:18	By these three was the third part of men killed, by the fire, and by the smoke, and by the brimstone, which issued out of their mouths.
Revelation 14:10	The same shall drink of the wine of the wrath of God, which is poured out without mixture into the cup of his indignation; and he shall be tormented with fire and brimstone in the presence of the holy angels, and in the presence of the Lamb:
Revelation 19:20	And the beast was taken, and with him the false prophet that wrought miracles before him, with which he deceived them that had received the mark of the beast, and them that worshipped his image. These both were cast alive into a lake of fire burning with brimstone.
Revelation 20:10	And the devil that deceived them was cast into the lake of fire and brimstone, where the beast and the false prophet are, and shall be tormented day and night for ever and ever.
Revelation 21:8	But the fearful, and unbelieving, and the abominable, and murderers, and whoremongers, and sorcerers, and idolaters, and all liars, shall have their part in the lake which burneth with fire and brimstone: which is the second death.

== Islamic reference ==
The story of prophet Lot finds mention in several Qur'anic passages, especially Chapter 26 (Ash-Shu'ara):160-175 which reads: "The people of Lut rejected the apostles. Behold, their brother Lut said to them: "Will ye not fear (God)? "I am to you an apostle worthy of all trust. "So fear God and obey me. "No reward do I ask of you for it: my reward is only from the Lord of the Worlds. "Of all the creatures in the world, will ye approach males, "And leave those whom God has created for you to be your mates? Nay, ye are a people transgressing (all limits)!" They said: "If thou desist not, O Lut! thou wilt assuredly be cast out!" He said: "I do detest your doings." "O my Lord! deliver me and my family from such things as they do!" So We delivered him and his family,- all Except an old woman who lingered behind. But the rest We destroyed utterly. We rained down on them a shower (of brimstone): and evil was the shower on those who were admonished (but heeded not)! Verily in this is a Sign: but most of them do not believe. And verily thy Lord is He, the Exalted in Might Most Merciful."

== History ==
According to Josephus, "Now this country is then so sadly burnt up, that nobody cares to come at it;... It was of old a most happy land, both for the fruits it bore and the riches of its cities, although it be now all burnt up. It is related how for the impiety of its inhabitants, it was burnt by lightning; in consequence of which there are still the remainders of that divine fire; and the traces (or shadows) of the five cities are still to be seen,..." (The Jewish War, book IV, end of ch. 8, in reference to Sodom.)

Puritan preacher Thomas Vincent (an eyewitness of the Great Fire of London) authored a book called "Fire and Brimstone in Hell", first published in 1670. In it he quotes from Psalm 11:6 "Upon the wicked he shall rain snares, fire and brimstone, and a horrible tempest, this shall be the portion of their cup."

Preachers such as Jonathan Edwards and George Whitefield were referred to as "fire-and-brimstone preachers" during the First Great Awakening of the 1730s and 1740s. Edwards' "Sinners in the Hands of an Angry God" remains among the best-known sermons from this period. Reports of one occasion when Edwards preached it said that many of the audience burst out weeping, and others cried out in anguish or even fainted.

==== Sulfur and lightning ====
Sulfur’s role as a symbol of divine wrath and punishment may come from its association with lightning. For centuries, lightning was thought to cause a sulfur smell when it struck, and was therefore linked with it, including in religious contexts. In the 12th century, the Byzantine scholar John Tzetzes discussed the different associations around the word theion in his Chiliades, mentioning different meanings such as sulfur, incense (which he links to the breath of the immortals) and thunder, as well as it referring to "bewildering" and "amazing" things, the stars, souls, and angels. He explains that thunder is divine fire, and that it gives off a strong smell resembling sulfur. Lightning being sulfurous is a very ancient belief, mentioned by ancient Roman authors and present in the works of Homer, where descriptions of the divine lightning of Zeus mention sulfur several times (in the Iliad, it strikes in front of the horses of Diomedes, causing a smell of sulfur and flames, at another point, Hector is compared to an oak uprooted by Zeus' lightning, smelling of sulfur, while in the Odyssey, it strikes a ship, filling it with sulfurous smoke). The 18th century theologian Jonathan Edwards considered lightning to be "a string of brimstone".

Lightning does not actually contain sulfur or produce sulfur odorants. Ozone would later be identified, in the 19th century, as the element behind the smell of lightning, but even then, people unfamiliar with ozone were said to still commonly misidentify the smell as brimstone. In a somewhat ironic twist, after the discovery of ozone, a popular Victorian belief started to attribute health benefits to sea air due to its smell, which was thought to be caused by a high ozone content. That smell is in fact caused by dimethyl sulfide, a sulfur compound.

== See also ==
- Hellfire preaching
- Afterlife
- Fear of God
- First Great Awakening § Conviction of sin
- Hell
- Sermon § Protestantism
- Sinners in the Hands of an Angry God
