= Yahya ibn Mu'adh al-Razi =

Sufi teacher (830–871)

Yaḥyā ibn Muʿādh al-Rāzī (Arabic: أبو زكريا يحيى بن معاذ بن جعفر الرازي; full name Abū Zakariyyā Yaḥyā ibn Muʿādh ibn Jaʿfar al-Rāzī) (830–871 CE) was a Muslim Sufi who taught in Central Asia. One of the first to teach Sufism in mosques, he left a number of books and sayings. In addition to his emphasis on rajāʾ, the hope for Jannah and for Allah's forgiveness, he was renowned for his perseverance in worship and his great scrupulousness in matters of religion. A disciple of Ibn Karram, he left his native town of Rey and resided for a time in Balkh, afterward proceeding to Nishapur where he died in 871 at the age of forty-one.
