= Gerard Luttikhuizen =

Dutch scholar of early Christianity

Gerard P. Luttikhuizen (born 1940) is a Dutch scholar of early Christianity, the New Testament and other early Christian writings, and a Coptologist. He has worked at the University of Groningen throughout his career, first as a lecturer in 1969–1988, and as a full professor after 1988. He took emeritus status in 2005.

His areas of research include Gnosticism and the Nag Hammadi library, the ancient Coptic Church and Coptic language documents, the influence of Hellenistic philosophy on early Christianity and Gnosticism, and Jewish Christian sects including the Elcesaites and the religious community that influenced Mani.

== Biography ==
Luttikhuizen was born in 1940 in Schoorl, The Netherlands. He was educated at the Catholic University of Nijmegen from 1964 to 1969 where he studied theology, Koine Greek, and the New Testament. He also spent 1968 to 1969 learning classical Coptic at the University of Münster, studying under Martin Krause. He joined the University of Groningen afterward in 1969 as a lecturer. His thesis on "The Revelation of Elchasai" (on the Elcesaites) was presented in 1984 and published in book form in 1985. He published Gnostische Geschriften I in 1986, a translation of the Gospel of Mary, Gospel of Philip, and Letter of Peter to Philip into the Dutch language.

He became a full professor at Groningen in 1988, served as dean of the Department of Theology and Religious Studies from 1990 to 1993, and became chair of the department later. Luttikhuizen had a fellowship at the Netherlands Institute for Advanced Study in the Humanities and Social Sciences in 2001–2002. He took emeritus status in 2005 and retired from teaching, although he continued to publish articles and research.

== Works ==
Books by Luttikhuizen include:

- The Revelation of Elchasai: Investigations into the Evidence for a Mesopotamian Jewish Apocalypse of the Second Century and its Reception by Judeo-Christian Propagandists (1985) (online scan)
- Gnostische Geschriften I: Het Evangelie naar Maria, Het Evangelie naar Filippus, De Brief van Petrus aan Filippus (1986)
- De Veelvormigheid van het Vroegste Christendom (2002, 3rd edition 2005)
  - Translated into English as The Diversity of Earliest Christianity (2012) (online scan)
  - Written for a popular audience, rather than his scholarly-focused books.
- Luttikhuizen, Gerard P. (2006). Gnostic Revisions of Genesis Stories and Early Jesus Traditions. Nag Hammadi and Manichaean Studies 58. Brill. doi:10.1163/9789047417057. ISBN 978-90-474-1705-7.

Books with collections of scholarly articles he has edited include:

- Text and Testimony: Essays on New Testament and Apocryphal Literature in Honour of A.F.J. Klijn (1988), with Tjitze Baarda, Anthony Hilhorst, and Adam S. van der Woude
- Interpretations of the Flood (1998), with Florentino García Martínez
- Eeuwig Kwetsbaar: Hedendaagse Kunst en Religie (1998), with Regnerus Steensma
- Paradise Interpreted: Representations of Biblical Paradise in Judaism and Christianity (1999)
- The Creation of Man and Woman: Interpretations of the Biblical Narratives in Jewish and Christian Traditions (2000)
- Eve's Children: The Biblical Stories Retold and Interpreted in Jewish and Christian Traditions (2003)
- Jerusalem, Alexandria, Rome: Studies in Ancient Cultural Interaction in Honour of A. Hilhorst (2003), with Florentino García Martínez
- Waar Haalden de Gnostici hun Wijsheid Vandaan? (2016), with Abraham Bos

A festschrift was written in his honor in 2005:

- The Wisdom of Egypt: Jewish, Early Christian, and Gnostic Essays in Honour of Gerard P. Luttikhuizen (2005)
