= Hellfire preaching =

Hell-fire preaching is a religious term that refers to preaching which calls attention to the final destiny of the impenitent, which usually focuses extremely on describing the painful torment in the Hereafter as a method to invite people to religion. There may be degrees of emphasis, and degrees of extent to which hell is emphasized in the khutbah (sermon or speech in Islam).

== Notable hellfire preachers ==
=== Christians ===
- Jonathan Edwards
- Charles Grandison Finney
- W. P. Nicholson
- Jack Hyles
- Oliver B. Greene
- Bob Jones III

=== Muslims ===
- Ibn Karram
- Muhammad Hussein Yacoub

== See also ==
- Expository preaching
- Extemporaneous preaching
- Fire and brimstone
- Preacher
