= Panarion =

Book by Epiphanius of Salamis about Christian heresies

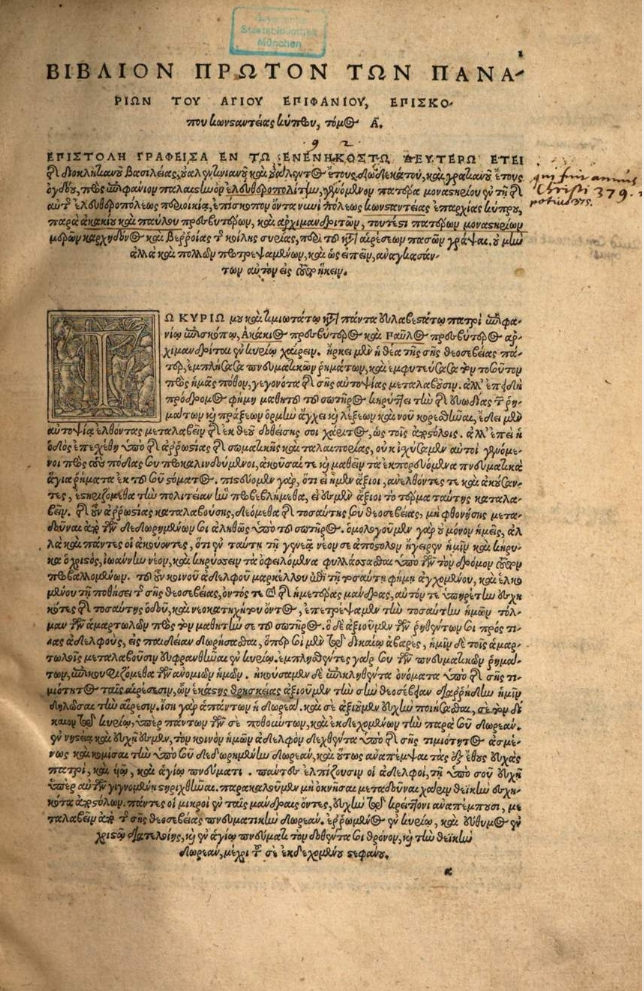
Epiphanius. Panarion. Edition of 1544

In early Christian heresiology, the Panarion (Koine Greek: Πανάριον, derived from Latin panarium, meaning "bread basket"), to which 16th-century Latin translations gave the name Adversus Haereses (Latin: "Against Heresies"), is the most important of the works of Epiphanius of Salamis. It was written in Koine Greek beginning in AD 374 or 375, and issued about three years later, as a treatise on heresies, with its title referring to the text as a "stock of remedies to offset the poisons of heresy." It treats 80 religious sects, either organized groups or philosophies, from the time of Adam to the latter part of the fourth century, detailing their histories, and rebutting their beliefs. The Panarion is an important source of information on the Jewish–Christian gospels, the Gospel of the Ebionites, and the Gospel of the Hebrews.

The treatise can be considered a sequel to the Ancoratus (374), which takes the form of a letter to the church of Syedra in Pamphylia, describing how the "barque" of the church can counteract the contrary winds of heretical thought, and become "anchored" (ἀγχυρωτός); hence the title of the work; the Ancoratus even outlines the content of the Panarion within its text.

== Content ==
The treatise begins with two proems: a table of contents, and a description of Epiphanius's methods and purpose in writing. The work is divided into three books, with a total of seven volumes. It ends with what has since been called De Fide, a short description of the orthodox catholic faith of the Great Church.

The number of sects covered in the work is based on Song of Songs 6:8-9, quoted below in the original Hebrew, and in the English translation from JPS 1917:

ח שִׁשִּׁים הֵמָּה מְלָכוֹת, וּשְׁמֹנִים פִּילַגְשִׁים; וַעֲלָמוֹת, אֵין מִסְפָּר.	8 There are threescore queens, and fourscore concubines, and maidens without number.
ט אַחַת הִיא, יוֹנָתִי תַמָּתִי	9 My dove, my undefiled, is but one;

Epiphanius interpreted the fourscore (80) concubines as sects, who take the name of Christ without being truly matrimonial; the threescore queens as the generations from Adam to Jesus; the one dove as the true wife, the church; and the numberless virgins as all the philosophies unrelated to Christianity.

The first section of the first of the three books contains an account of 20 heretical sects before the time of Jesus; the remaining portion is occupied with the description of 60 sects of Christianity. However, the total number of sects is actually 77, because three of the first 20 are general names: Hellenism, Samaritanism, and Judaism. In the editions of the Panarion, each heresy is numbered in order; hence it is customary to quote the Panarion as follows: Epiphanius, Haer. N [the number of the heresy].

The general form, though not universal, in which Epiphanius described each sect included four parts: a brief mention of the sect's relationship to previously mentioned sects; a description of the sect's beliefs; a lengthy refutation of its doctrine, including arguments from the scriptures and reductio ad absurdum of their beliefs; a comparison of the sect to a repulsive animal, particularly a snake.

Necessarily much of the information in this large compilation varies in value. The Panarion reflects the character of Epiphanius and his method of working. Sometimes, his intense passion prevents him from inquiring carefully into the doctrines he opposes. Thus, on his own avowal (Haer., lxxi), he speaks of Apollinarianism on hearsay. At Constantinople, he had to acknowledge to the Origenist monks, whom he opposed, that he was not acquainted with either their school or their books, and that he only spoke from hearsay (Sozomen, Hist. eccl., VIII, xl). There is, however, much information not found elsewhere. Chapters devoted only to the doctrinal refutation of heresies are rare. As an apologist, Epiphanius appeared generally weak to Photius.

The Panarion furnishes very valuable information concerning the religious history of the fourth century, either because the author confines himself to transcribing documents preserved by him alone, or because he writes down his personal observations. With regard to Hieracas (Haer., lxvii), he makes known a curious Egyptian sect by whom asceticism and intellectual work were equally esteemed. In connection with the Melitians of Egypt (Haer., lxviii), he has preserved important fragments of contemporary Egyptian history of this movement. With regard to Arianism (Haer., lxix), he provides an apocryphal letter of Constantine. He transcribes two letters of Arius. He is the only one to give us any information concerning the Gothic sect of the Audians (Haer., lxx), as well as the Arabian sect of the Collyridians. He has made use of the lost report of the discussion between Photinus (Haer., lxxi), and Basil of Ancyra. He has transcribed a very important letter from Bishop Marcellus of Ancyra (Haer., lxxii) to Pope Julius, and fragments of the treatise of Acacius of Caesarea against Marcellus. With regard to the Semiarians (Haer., lxxiii), he gives in the Acts of the Council of Ancyra (358) a letter from Basil of Ancyra and one from George of Laodicea, and the stenographic text of a singular sermon of Melitius at the time of his installation at Antioch. In the chapter dealing with the Anomeans (Haer., lxxvi) he has preserved a monograph of Aetius.

Epiphanius also wrote the Anacephalaeoses, as an epitome, or abridged version, of his Panarion. Augustine used them as the basis for his Contra Omnes Haereses, "Against all Heresies".

== Translations ==
The original text was written in Koine Greek. Three Latin versions were published in the 16th and 17th centuries, from writers focused on ecclesiastical interests. Since then, writers have been interested in the historical content of the text itself.

An Old Church Slavonic translation was made, probably at the Preslav school during the reign of Tsar Simeon I of Bulgaria in the early 10th century. It is preserved in the 12th-century kormchaya of Ephraim. A full Russian translation was published in the 19th century. A partial translation exists in German and another in English (by Philip Amidon).

The first English translation of the entire Panarion was published in 1987 (Book I) and 1993 (Books II and III), by Frank Williams. This was based on Karl Holl's edition, released in 1915 (Book I), 1922 (Book II), and 1933 (Book III), totaling 1500 pages.
