= Heresiology =

Study of heresy

In theology or the history of religion, heresiology is the study of heresy, and heresiographies are writings about the topic. Heresiographical works were common in both medieval Christianity and Islam.

Heresiology developed as a part of the emerging definition of Christian orthodoxy. Church scholars studied and documented the teachings of various Christian sects in order to clearly distinguish between those they accepted as orthodox and those they rejected as heretical. Other Christian communions developed their own competing heresiological traditions as well.

Early Christian heresiologists included figures such as Irenaeus of Lyon, Hippolytus of Rome, and Epiphanius of Salamis, who wrote from a Christian apologetic perspective.

In Islam, heresiology surveyed both the various Muslim sects, and also other religions such as Christianity and Judaism. Some, like Abu Mansur al-Baghdadi and Ibn Hazm wrote polemical works, arguing the falseness of sects and religions other than their own. Others, like al-Shahrastani's Al-Milal wa al-Nihal, took a more impartial approach closer to modern religious studies works.

== See also ==
- Doxography – similar outlines of philosophies

== Bibliography ==
- Bauer, Walter (1971). Orthodoxy and Heresy in Earliest Christianity. Philadelphia: Fortress Press. ISBN 0-8006-1363-5. (original edition 1934; on-line: Updated Electronic English Edition by Robert A. Kraft, 1993)
- Berzon, Todd S. (2016). Classifying Christians. Ethnography, Heresiology, and the Limits of Knowledge in Late Antiquity. Berkeley: University of California Press. ISBN 9780520284265.
- Le Boulluec, Alain (1985). La notion d'hérésie dans la littérature grecque. Paris: Etudes Augustiniennes.
  - The Notion of Heresy in Greek Literature in the Second and Third Centuries. New York: Oxford University Press. 2022.
