= Pierson Parker =

American scholar (1905–1995)

Pierson Parker (May 27, 1905 – December 13, 1995) was an American New Testament scholar. He was professor of New Testament at the General Theological Seminary during the 1960s. He was best known for his work on the origins and priority of the Gospels.

After Morton Smith had published his two books on the Secret Gospel of Mark, Pierson published a somewhat critical review in The New York Times, wondering whether the document was “an early Christian cover-up” and saying that the passages “read not like Mark’s work but like a late and not wholly successful imitation” made before the time of Clement of Alexandria.

Pierson was also involved in the Today's English Version 1976.

== Personal life ==
He was the son of Alvin Pierson and Susie Estelle (née Williams) Parker. He was born in Shanghai, China. He married Mildred Ruth Sorg on the June 12, 1933. They had one son, Peter Pierson.

== Works ==
=== Thesis ===
- Parker, Pierson (1933). Ancient citations of the gospel according to the Hebrews: a critical study (MA). Berkeley, CA: Pacific School of Religion. OCLC 63762660.
- ——— (1934). A Partial Reconstruction of the Gospel according to the Hebrews (Ph.D.). Berkeley, CA: Pacific School of Religion. OCLC 64034916.

=== Books ===
- ——— (1953). The Gospel before Mark. Chicago, IL: University of Chicago Press. OCLC 3051141.
- ——— (1957). Inherit the Promise: six keys to New Testament thought. Greenwich, CT: Seabury Press. OCLC 383102.
- ——— (1958). Christ our Hope: six clues to New Testament thought. London: SPCK. OCLC 6428901.

=== Chapters ===
- ——— (1975). "The kinship of John and Acts". In Neusner, Jacob; Smith, Morton (eds.). Christianity, Judaism and other Greco-Roman cults.
- ——— (1976). "Introduction". Good news in Matthew: Matthew in Today's English version. Cleveland, OH: Collins & World. ISBN 9780529054029. OCLC 3866828.
- ——— (1977). "Crucifixion". In Burrick, G. A. (ed.). Interpreter's Dictionary of the Bible. Vol. 1. Philadelphia, PA: Fortress Press. p. 747.
- ——— (1983). "The posteriority of Mark". In Farmer, William Reuben (ed.). New Synoptic Studies: the Cambridge Gospel Conference and beyond.

=== Journal articles ===
- ——— (1940). "A Proto-Lukan Basis for the Gospel According to the Hebrews". Journal of Biblical Literature. 59: 471–478.
- ——— (1941). "The Meaning of 'Son of Man'". Journal of Biblical Literature. 60: 151–57.
- ——— (1956). "Two Editions of John". Journal of Biblical Literature. 75: 303–314.
- ——— (July 1964). "In Praise of 1611". Anglican Theological Review. 3: 251–60.
