= Al-Milal wa al-Nihal =

Book by Muhammad al-Shahrastani

- Original title: الملل والنحل
- Language: Arabic
- Subject: Comparative religion
- Genre: Non-fiction
- Media type: Print (Hardcover & Paperback)

Kitāb al-Milal wa al-Nihal (Arabic: كتاب الملل والنحل, The Book of Sects and Creeds), written by the Islamic scholar Muhammad al-Shahrastani (d. 1153 CE), is a non-polemical study of religious communities and philosophies that had existed up to his time, considered to be the first systematic study of religion. It was written around 1127-1128 and divides religions between sects which have written doctrines and creeds and that which do not.

A French translation of the book by Gimaret, Monnot and Jolivet was sponsored by UNESCO (Livre des religions et des sectes. Leuven, Peeters: vol. I, 1986, Vol. II, 1993).

== Contents ==
The book goes through six different major sectarian divisions and then the subdivisions within them, including:

1. Mu'tazilism
2. Jabriyya
3. Sifatiyya
4. Kharijites
5. Murji'ah
6. Shia Islam

== See also ==
- Al-Farq bayn al-Firaq
- List of Sunni books
