= Alcibiades of Apamea =

Alcibiades of Apamea (fl. 230) was a Jewish Christian member of, or possibly even founder of, the Elcesaites. Of the several cities called Apamea it is Apamea in Syria which is intended. He is known only from the accounts of Hippolytus of Rome in his Refutations (Refutatio omnium haeresium, Book 10 ch. 9–13), where he follows on from Hippolytus' attacks on Pope Callixtus I:

Hippolytus 10.9

— The doctrine of this Callistus having been noised abroad throughout the entire world, a cunning man, and full of desperation, one called Alcibiades, dwelling in Apamea, a city of Syria, examined carefully into this business. And considering himself a more formidable character, and more ingenious in such tricks, than Callistus, he repaired to Rome; and he brought some book, alleging that a certain just man, Elchasai, had received this from Serae, a town of Parthia, and that he gave it to one called Sobiai. And the contents of this volume, he alleged, had been revealed by an angel whose height was 24 schoenoi, which make 96 miles, and whose breadth is 4 schoenoi, and from shoulder to shoulder 6 schoenoi; and the tracks of his feet extend to the length of three and a half schoenoi, which are equal to fourteen miles, while the breadth is one schoenos and a half, and the height half a schoenos. And he alleges that also there is a female with him, whose measurement, he says, is according to the standards already mentioned. And he asserts that the male (angel) is Son of God, but that the female is called Holy Spirit. By detailing these prodigies he imagines that he confounds fools, while at the same time he utters the following sentence: "that there was preached unto men a new remission of sins in the third year of Trajan's reign."
