= Al-Shahrastani =

Persian historian of religions and Islamic scholar (1086–1153)

Tāj al-Dīn Abū al-Fath Muhammad ibn `Abd al-Karīm ash-Shahrastānī
- تاج الدين أبو الفتح محمد بن عبد الكريم الشهرستاني
- Title: Nā’ib (Deputy) of the chancellery for Sanjar, the Saljūq ruler of Khurāsān

Personal life
- Born: al-Shahrastani; 1086 CE Shahristān, Khorasan (province of Persia)
- Died: 1153 Shahristān, Khorasan
- Era: Islamic Golden Age
- Region: Shahristān, Khorasan
- Main interest(s): History, theology, Kalam, philosophy, historiography, Islamic jurisprudence
- Notable work(s): Al-Milal wa al-Nihal, Nihayat al-Iqdam fi 'Ilm al-Kalam

Religious life
- Religion: Islam
- Denomination: Sunni
- Jurisprudence: Shafi'i
- Creed: Ash'ari

Muslim leader
- Influenced by: Al-Juwayni
- Influenced: Sayf al-Din al-Amidi

Tāj al-Dīn Abū al-Fath Muhammad ibn `Abd al-Karīm ash-Shahrastānī (Arabic: تاج الدين أبو الفتح محمد بن عبد الكريم الشهرستاني; 1086–1153 CE), also known as Muhammad al-Shahrastānī, was an influential Seljuk Persian historian of religions, a historiographer, Islamic scholar, philosopher and theologian. His book, Kitab al-Milal wa al-Nihal (lit. The Book of Sects and Creeds) was one of the pioneers in developing an objective and philosophical approach to the study of religions.

== Life ==
Very few things are known about al-Shahrastānī's life. He was born in 1086 CE, in the town of Shahristān, (Khorasan, province of Persia) where he acquired his early traditional education. Later, he was sent to Nīshāpūr where he studied under different masters who were all disciples of the Ash`ari theologian al-Juwaynī (d. 1085). At the age of thirty, al-Shahrastānī went to Baghdad to pursue theological studies and taught for three years at the prestigious Ash`ari school, the Nizamiyya of Baghdad. Afterwards, he returned to Persia where he worked as Nā’ib (Deputy) of the chancellery for Sanjar, the Saljūq ruler of Khurāsān. At the end of his life, al-Shahrastānī went back to live in his native town, where he died in the year 1153.

== Works ==
Al-Shahrastani distinguished himself by his desire to describe in the most objective way the universal religious history of humanity.

This is reflected in his Kitab al-Milal wa al-Nihal (The Book of Sects and Creeds), a monumental work, which presents the doctrinal points of view of all the religions and philosophies which existed up to his time. The book was one of the earliest systematic studies of religion, and is noted for its non-polemical style and scientific approach. A French translation of the book by Gimaret, Monnot and Jolivet was sponsored by UNESCO (Livre des religions et des sectes. Peeters: 1986, 1993).

Al-Shahrastani's philosophical and theological thoughts manifested in his other major works, which include:

- The Nihāyat al-aqdām fī 'ilm al-kalām (The End of Steps in the Science of Theology) presents different theological discussions and shows the limits of Muslim theology (kalam).
- The Majlis is a discourse, written during the mature period of his life, delivered to a Twelver Shi`ite audience.
- The Musara`at al-Falasifa (The Struggle with Philosophers) criticizes Ibn Sina (Avicenna)’s doctrines by emphasizing some peculiar Isma'ili arguments on the division of beings.
- The Mafatih al-Asrar wa-masabih al-abrar (The Keys of the Mysteries and the Lamps of the Righteous) introduces the Qur’an and gives a complete commentary on the first two chapters of the Qur’an.

== Religious belief ==
Although self-identified as an Ash'ari in terms of theology and a Shafi’i in terms of law, as can be seen in his books, Al-Milal wa al-Nihal, and Nihayat al-Iqdam fi 'Ilm al-Kalam, a few of his contemporaries accused him of covertly being an Isma'ili, and modern scholars believe that he was actually an Isma’ili practicing taqiya, or dissimulation, based on statements throughout his writings that correspond strongly with Isma’ili mysticism and its central doctrine of the Imamate.

Al-Shahrastani was amongst those attracted by the "new preaching" (da'wah jadidah) which Hasan-i Sabbāh, the Isma'ili da'i and founder of the medieval Nizari Isma'ili state, initiated. This preaching sought to spread the idea that humanity is always in need of infallible and divine teaching, which can only be provided by a divinely appointed guide. Al-Shahrastani tried to keep this a secret, but it was revealed by his student Al-Sam'ani. His works include a Quranic commentary that is infused with Isma’ili terminology, in which he hinted at his conversion by a "pious servant of God" who taught him how to find the esoteric (batin) meaning of the Quran. In his Kitab Al-musara'ah (Book of the wrestling match), al-Shahrastani criticizes Avicenna's belief that God is the involuntary necessitating cause of the world, and he also provides support for the Ismaili thesis that God is beyond being and nonbeing.

== Christian commentary ==
In Kitab al-Milal wa al-Nihal, al-Shahrastani records a portrayal of Christianity very close to the orthodox tenets while continuing the Islamic narrative:

“The Christians. (They are) the community (umma) of the Christ, Jesus, son of Mary (peace upon him). He it is who was truly sent (as prophet; mab'uth) after Moses (peace upon him), and who was announced in the Torah. To him were (granted) manifest signs and notable evidences, such as the reviving of the dead and the curing of the blind and the leper. His very nature and innate disposition (fitra) are a perfect sign of his truthfulness; that is, his coming without previous seed and his speaking without prior teaching. For all the (other) prophets the arrival of their revelation was at (the age of) forty years, but revelation came to him when he was made to speak in the cradle, and revelation came to him when he conveyed (the divine message) at (the age of) thirty. The duration of his (prophetic) mission (da'wa) was three years and three months and three days."

Al-Shahrastani also explains the differences between Christians in Kitab al-Milal wa al-Nihal regarding the incarnation (tajassud):

"They affirmed that God has three hypostases (aqanim). They said that the Creator (may he be exalted) is one substance (jawhar), meaning by this what is self-subsistent (al-qa'im bi-n-nafs), not (what is characterized by) spatial location and physical magnitude; and he is one in substantiality, three in hypostaticity (uqnumiyya). By the hypostases they mean the attributes (sifat), such as existence, life and knowledge, and the father, the son and the holy spirit (ruh al-qudus). The (hypostasis of) knowledge clothes itself and was incarnated, but not the other hypostases."

== Bibliography ==
Works and studies in English

- al-Shahrastānī, The Summa philosophiae, (Kitāb Nihāyatu ʼl-Iqdām fī ʽIlmi ʼl –Kalām), edited with a translation by Alfred Guillaume, London, Oxford University Press 1934.
- Muhammad b. 'Abd al-Karim Shahrastani, Muslim Sects and Divisions. The Section on Muslim Sects in Kitab al-Milal wa 'l-Nibal, translated by A. K.Kazi and J. G.Flynn, London, Kegan Paul International 1984 (reprint New York, Routledge 2013).
- al-Shahrastānī, Struggling with the Philosopher: A Refutation of Avicenna's Metaphysics, translation by Wilferd Madelung and Toby Mayer of Kitāb Muṣāraʿat al-falāsifa, London, Tauris, 2001.
- al-Shahrastānī, Keys to the Arcana: Shahrastānī's Esoteric Commentary on the Qurʼan: A Translation of the Commentary on Sūrat al-Fātiḥa, by Toby Mayer; with the Arabic text reproduced from the edition by M.A. Adharshab, New York, Oxford University Press, 2009.
- Bruce B. Lawrence, Shahrastani on the Indian Religions, Preface by Franz Rosenthal, The Hague, Mouton, 1976 (with the translation of Shahrastânï's Kitäb al-milal wan-nihal Part II, Book III, Section Β 'Ära al-hind'l, The Views of the Indians, pp. 33–62).
- Steigerwald, Diana, "The Divine Word (Kalima) in Shahrastani's Majlis." In Studies in Religion/Sciences religieuses, vol. 25.3, 1996, pp. 335–52.
- Steigerwald, Diana, "Al-Shahrastānī’s Contribution to Medieval Islamic Thought." In Todd Lawson (ed.), Reason and Inspiration in Islam: Theology, Philosophy and Mysticism in Muslim Thought. Essays in Honor of Hermann Landolt. London: I.B. Tauris, 2005, pp. 262–273.

Works and studies in French

- Al-Shahrastānī, Livre des religions et des sectes, traduction par Daniel Gimaret, Guy Monnot, Jean Jolivet, Louvain, Peeters et UNESCO, 1986–1993 (two volumes)
- Al-Shahrastānī, Majlis: Discours sur l'ordre et la création. (Majlis-i maktub-i Shahrastāni-i munʿaqid dar Khwārazm. Edited by Muḥammad Riżā R. Jalāli Naʾini) traduction française de Diane Steigerwald), Sainte-Foy (Québec): Les Presses de l'Université Laval 1999.
- Jolivet, Jean, "Al-Shahrastânî critique d'Avicenne dans la lutte contre les philosophes (quelques aspects)," Arabic Sciences and Philosophy, 2000, vol. 10, pp. 275–292.
- Monnot, Guy, "Islam: exégèse coranique." Annuaire de l'École Pratique des Hautes Études. Section des sciences religieuses, sur Shahrastani:
  - "L'Introduction de Shahrastâni à son commentaire coranique inédit", Tome 92, 1983–1984. 1983. pp. 305–316;
  - "La Sourate d'ouverture dans le commentaire coranique inédit de Shahrastânï", Tome 93, 1984–1985. 1984. pp. 293–303;
  - "Le commentaire coranique inédit de Shahrastânî (suite)", Tome 94, 1985–1986. 1985. pp. 347–351;
  - "La Sourate de la Vache dans le commentaire coranique inédit de Shahrastânî", Tome 95, 1986–1987. 1986. pp. 253–259;
  - "« Les clefs des mystères » de Shahrastânî", Tome 96, 1987–1988. 1987. pp. 237–243;
  - "« Les clefs des mystères > de Sharastânî (suite)", Tome 97, 1988–1989. 1988. pp. 249–255.
- Monnot, Guy, 1996 «Shahrastani», su: Encyclopédie de l'islam, 1996, vol. 9, pp. 220–22.
- Monnot, Guy, 1999 Book review of La pensée philosophique et théologique de Shahrastani (m. 548/1153) by Diane Steigerwald in: Bulletin critique des annales islamologiques, vol. 15, pp. 79–81.
- Monnot, Guy, 2001 Book review of Majlis-i maktub-i Shahrastani-i mun'aqid dar Khwarazm. Ed. Muhammad Rida R. Jalali Na'ini and translated into French by Diane Steigerwald in Majlis: Discours sur l'ordre et la création. Sainte-Foy (Québec): Les Presses de l'Université Laval in Bulletin critique des annales islamologiques, vol. 17.
- Steigerwald, Diana, 1995 "L'Ordre (Amr) et la création (khalq) chez Shahrastani." Folia Orientalia, vol. 31, pp. 163–75.
- Steigerwald, Diana, 1997 La pensée philosophique et théologique de Shahrastani (m. 548/1153). Sainte-Foy (Québec): Les Presses de l'Université Laval.
- Steigerwald, Diana, 1998 "La dissimulation (taqiyya) de la foi dans le shi'isme ismaélien." Studies in Religion/Sciences religieuses, vol. 27.1, pp. 39–59.

Works and studies in German

- Al-Shahrastānī, Abū al-Fatḥ Ibn ʿAbd al-Karīm, Religionspartheien und Philosophen-Schulen, traduzione di Kitāb al-Milal wa al-Niḥal a cura di Theodor Haarbrücker, Halle, Schwetschke, 1850–1851 (due volumi).
- Madelung, Wilferd, "Ash-Shahrastanis Streitschrift gegen Avicenna und ihre Widerlegung durch Nasir ad-din at-Tusi." Akten des VII. Kongresses für Arabistik und Islamwissenschaft, Abhandlungen der Akademie des Wissenschaften in Göttingen, 1976, vol. 98, pp. 250–9.

Works in Arabic

- Al-Shahrastānī, Abū al-Fatḥ Ibn ʿAbd al-Karīm, 1923 Kitāb al-Milal wa al-Niḥal. Ed. William Cureton in Books of Religions and Philosophical Sects. 2 vols. Leipzig: Otto Harrassowitz (reprint of the edition of London 1846).
- Danish-Pazhuh, Muhammad Taqi, "Dāʿi al-duʿāt Taj al-din-i Shahrastana." Nama-yi astan-i quds, 1968. vol. 7, pp. 77–80.
- Danish-Pazhuh, Muhammad Taqi, "Dāʿi al-duʿāt Taj al-din-i Shahrastana." Nama-yi astan-i quds, 1969, vol. 8, pp. 61–71.
- Naʿini, Jalāli, 1964 Sharh-i Ḥāl wa Athar-i Ḥujjat al-Ḥaqq Abu al-Fatḥ Muḥammad b. ʿAbd al-Karim b. Aḥmad Shahrastāni. Tehran.
- al-Nuʿmān, Abū Ḥanīfa, 1956 Al-Risāla al-Mudhhiba. In: Khams Rasāʾil Ismāʿīliyya. Ed. ʿĀrif Tāmir, Beirut.
- Al-Shahrastānī, Abū al-Fatḥ Ibn ʿAbd al-Karīm, 1366-1375/1947-1955 Kitāb al-Milal wa al-Niḥal. Ed. Muḥammad Fatḥ Allāh Badrān, 2 vols. Cairo.
- Al-Shahrastānī, Abū al-Fatḥ Ibn ʿAbd al-Karīm, 1396/1976 Muṣāraʿat al-falāsifa. Ed. Suhayr M. Mukhtār. Cairo.
- Al-Shahrastānī, Abū al-Fatḥ Ibn ʿAbd al-Karīm, 1989 Mafātīḥ al-asrār wa-masābīḥ al-abrār. Tehran.

== See also ==
- Kitab al–Milal wa al-Nihal
- List of Ash'aris and Maturidis
- List of Muslim theologians
- List of Persian scientists and scholars
