= Elcesaites =

Ancient Jewish Christian sect in Sassanid southern Mesopotamia

The Elcesaites, Elkasaites, Elkesaites or Elchasaites were an ancient Jewish Christian sect in Lower Mesopotamia, then the province of Asoristan in the Sasanian Empire that was active between the early second century and the fifth century AD. The members of this sect, which originated in the Transjordan, performed frequent baptisms for purification and had a Gnostic orientation.

The movement blended elements of Second Temple Judaism, early Jewish Christianity, Gnosticism, and apocalyptic mysticism, and it is primarily known through the writings of early Church Fathers such as Hippolytus of Rome, Origen, and Epiphanius of Salamis.

The name of the sect derives from the alleged founder, Elkhasaí (Koine Greek: Ἠλχασαΐ in Hippolytus), Elksai (Ἠλξαί in Epiphanius), or Elkesai (Ελκεσαΐ in Eusebius, and Theodoret).

== Patristic testimony ==
The sect is directly mentioned only in the commentaries on "heresies" by Early Church Fathers.

=== Hippolytus (c. 170 – c. 236) ===
Hippolytus of Rome (Refutation of All Heresies, IX, 8–13) records that in the time of Pope Callixtus I (217–222 AD), a Jewish Christian called Alcibiades of Apamea came to Rome, bringing a book which he said had been received in Parthia by a just man named Elchasai. According to Alcibiades, the book had been revealed by an angel 96 miles (154 km) high (337,920 cubits), 16 miles (26 km) broad (56,230 cubits) and 24 miles (39 km) (84,480 cubits) across the shoulders, whose footprints were 14 miles (23 km) long, 6 miles (9.7 km) wide and 2 miles (3.2 km) deep. This giant angel was the Son of God, who was accompanied by his sister, the Holy Ghost, of the same dimensions. Alcibiades announced that a new remission of sins had been proclaimed in the third year of Trajan (100 AD), and he described a baptism which should impart this forgiveness even to the grossest sinners.

Hippolytus' commentary starts in book 9, chapter 8. In his next section, Hippolytus recounts that Alcibiades teaches the natural birth, preexistence and reincarnation of Jesus, which Louis Ginzberg suggested in 1906 may relate to the concept of Adam Kadmon, and also that Alcibiades teaches circumcision and the Law of Moses. Hippolytus then goes on at length to describe the group's teaching on baptism. For all sins of impurity, even against nature, a second baptism is enjoined "in the name of the great and most high God and in the name of His Son the great King", with an adjuration of the seven witnesses written in the book (sky, water, the holy spirits, the angels of prayer, oil, salt and earth). One who has been bitten by a mad dog is to run to the nearest water and jump in with all his clothes on, using the foregoing formula, and promising the seven witnesses that he will abstain from sin. The same treatment – forty days consecutively of baptism in cold water – is recommended for consumption and for the possessed. In his chapter 11, Hippolytus discusses in more detail the teaching of the book including Elchasai's Sabbatarian teaching and the instruction not to baptise under certain astrological stars. Hippolytus concludes his review of the Elcesaites in Refutations, book 10, chapter 12 with a general exhortation to avoid heresy which gives away no more information.

Adolf von Harnack (1898) reads "was proclaimed" instead of "has been proclaimed" (as if eúaggelisthênai and not eúeggelísthai), and thus inferred that a special year of remission is spoken of as past once for all – and that Alcibiades had no reason for inventing this, so that Adolf Bernhard Christoph Hilgenfeld (1884) was right in holding that Elchasai really lived under Trajan, as Epiphanius of Salamis supposed.

=== Eusebius (c. 263–339) ===
Eusebius (History 6.38) records a summary of a sermon on Psalm 82 delivered in Caesarea by Origen c. 240–250 AD which warns his audience against the doctrine of "the Elkesaites". Eusebius' record of this sermon forms the second source on the group. According to Eusebius, Origen regarded the heresy as quite new, and states that the group deny the writings of Paul, but claim to have received a new book from heaven.

Another error also arose at this time, called the heresy of the Elkesites, which was extinguished in the very beginning. Origen speaks of it in this manner in a public homily on the eighty-second Psalm:

"A certain man came just now, puffed up greatly with his own ability, proclaiming that godless and impious opinion which has appeared lately in the churches, styled 'of the Elkesites.' I will show you what evil things that opinion teaches, that you may not be carried away by it. It rejects certain parts of every scripture. Again it uses portions of the Old Testament and the Gospel, but rejects the apostle altogether. It says that to deny Christ is an indifferent matter, and that he who understands will, under necessity, deny with his mouth, but not in his heart. They produce a certain book which they say fell from heaven. They hold that whoever hears and believes this shall receive remission of sins, another remission than that which Jesus Christ has given."

Such is the account of these persons.

— Book VI. Chapter 38. "The Heresy of the Elkesites."

=== Epiphanius (c. 310/20 – 403) ===
A century and a half later, Epiphanius of Salamis found it in use among the Sampsæans, descendants of the earlier Elcesaites, and also among the Essenes and many other Ebionite communities. Epiphanius also mentions that the book condemned virginity and continence and made marriage obligatory. It permitted the worship of cult images to escape persecution, provided the act was merely an external one, disavowed in the heart. Prayer was to be made not to the East, but always towards Jerusalem.

Yet all animal sacrifice was condemned, with a denial that it had been offered by the Patriarchs or in the Torah. The Prophets as well as the Christian Apostles were rejected, as well as Paul the Apostle and all his writings.

Epiphanius mentions as Elkesai's brother a man called Jekseos (Koine Greek: Iεξέος in Hæreses, xix. 1), and explains the brother's name as being derived from the Hebrew for "hidden power" and Elkesai as "the hidden God." Epiphanius records that the saints of the Elcesaites were two women: Martha ("mistress") and Marthana ("our mistress").

According to Joseph Lightfoot, the Church Father Epiphanius (writing in the 4th century CE) seems to make a distinction between two main groups within the Essenes: "Of those that came before his [Elxai (Elkesai), an Ossaean prophet] time and during it, the Ossaeans and the Nasaraeans. "Part 19" Epiphanius describes the Ossaeans as following:

After this Nasaraean sect in turn comes another closely connected with them, called the Ossaeans. These are Jews like the former... originally came from Nabataea, Ituraea, Moabitis, and Arielis, the lands beyond the basin of what sacred scripture called the Salt Sea... Though it is different from the other six of these seven sects, it causes schism only by forbidding the books of Moses like the Nasaraean.

== Other sources ==
The Cologne Mani-Codex (dated from the fourth century) describes the parents of Mani, founder of Manichaeism, as "followers of the prophet Alchasaios", which scholars have identified with Elchasai. Alchasaios is stated to be a prophet also honoured by Mani. His name appears in several other sources on Manichaeism, but in so altered a form that the identification with Elchasai was clear only with the publication of the Cologne codex.

The Codex deals with the Elcesaites extensively, confirms some of the Church Fathers’ statements about them, and depicts Mani as a "reformer" with the purpose to "restore" the true doctrine of prophet Alchasaios, which his followers had "misunderstood". In particular, Mani criticises their repeated baptism rituals.

The Elcesaites may be mentioned in a Persepolis inscription from the third century, with a sect name mktk- from the Iranian root mak-, "to moisten" or "to wash". Much later, in his Fihrist, the Arabic Muslim scholar ibn al-Nadim, c. 987, found Mogtasilah ("washers"), a sect of Sabians in the desert who counted al-Hasih (possibly Arabic for "Elchasai") as their founder.

== Possible common source of Mandaean and Manichaean texts ==
Van Bladel (2017) suggests that hymns which have close parallels in the Mandaean Qulasta and Left Ginza and the Manichaean Psalms of Thomas (earlier suggested by Säve-Söderbergh (1949) to be due to Manichaean adaptations of Mandaean hymns) may have a common Elchasaite source.

== See also ==
- Origins of Christianity
- Mandaeans
- Docetism
