= Epiphanius of Salamis =

4th–century Christian bishop and saint

Saint Epiphanius of Salamis
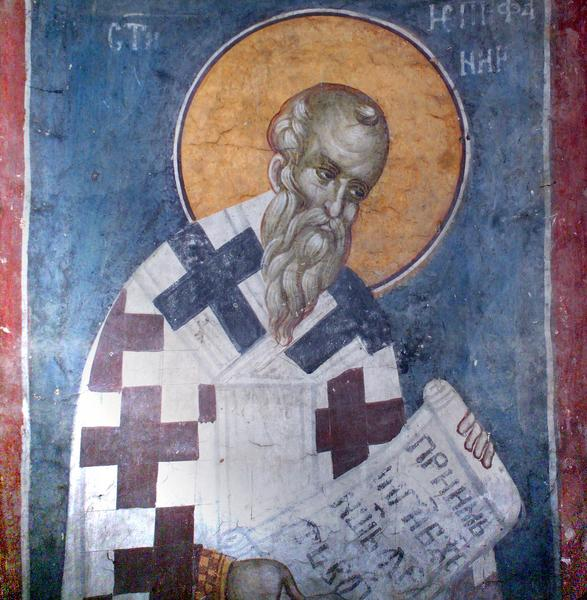
- St. Epiphanius in a fresco painting (Gračanica Monastery)

Bishop of Salamis (Cyprus), Oracle of Palestine
- Born: c. 310–320; Roman Palestine
- Died: 403 (aged 82–93) at sea
- Venerated in: Catholicism; Eastern Orthodox Church; Oriental Orthodox Churches
- Feast: 12 May; 17 Pashons (Coptic Orthodoxy)
- Attributes: Vested as a bishop in omophorion, sometimes holding a scroll
- Controversy: Iconoclasm

Epiphanius of Salamis (Ancient Greek: Ἐπιφάνιος; c. 310–320 – 403) was the bishop of Salamis, Cyprus, at the end of the 4th century. He is considered a saint and a Church Father by the Eastern Orthodox, Catholic Churches, and some Presbyterians. He gained a reputation as a strong defender of orthodoxy. He is best known for composing the Panarion, a compendium of eighty heresies, which also included pagan religions and philosophical systems. There has been much controversy over how many of the quotations attributed to him by the Byzantine Iconoclasts were actually by him. Regardless of this, he was clearly strongly against some contemporary uses of images in the church.

== Life ==
Epiphanius was either born into a Greek-speaking Christian family or became a Christian in his youth, in the small settlement of Besanduk, near Eleutheropolis (modern-day Beit Guvrin-Maresha National Park in Israel). He later lived as a monk in Egypt, where he was educated and came into contact with Valentinian groups. He returned to Roman Palestine around 333, when he was still a young man, and founded a monastery at Ad near Eleutheropolis, which is often mentioned in the polemics of Jerome with Rufinus and John, Bishop of Jerusalem. He was ordained a priest, and lived and studied as superior of the monastery in Ad, that he founded, for thirty years and gained much skill and knowledge in that position. In that position he gained the ability to speak in several languages, including Hebrew, Syriac, Egyptian, Greek, and Latin, and was called by Jerome on that account Pentaglossos ("Five-tongued").

Epiphanius was a contemporary of Hilarion (c. 291 – 371), an anchorite who followed the example of his Egyptian mentor, Anthony the Great (c. 251 – 356) retreating to the wilderness in the coastal area near Gaza and is considered by his biographer Jerome to be the founder of Palestinian monasticism, and Chariton (mid-3rd century – c. 350), founder of monasticism in the Judaean Desert.

Epiphanius's reputation for learning prompted his nomination and consecration as Bishop of Salamis, Cyprus, in 365 or 367, a post which he held until his death. He was also the Metropolitan of the Church of Cyprus. He served as bishop for nearly forty years, as well as travelled widely to combat differing beliefs. He was present at a synod in Antioch (376) where the Trinitarian questions were debated against the heresy of Apollinarianism. He upheld the position of Bishop Paulinus, who had the support of Rome, over that of Meletius of Antioch, who was supported by the Eastern Churches. In 382 he was present at the Council of Rome, again upholding the cause of Paulinus.

== Origenist controversy and death ==
During a visit to Palestine in 394 or 395, while preaching in Jerusalem, he attacked Origen's followers and urged the Bishop of Jerusalem, John II, to condemn his writings. He urged John to be careful of the "offence" of images in the churches. He noted that when travelling in Palestine he went into a church to pray and saw a curtain with an image of Christ or a saint which he tore down. He told Bishop John that such images were "opposed ... to our religion". This event sowed the seeds of conflict which erupted in the dispute between Rufinus and John against Jerome and Epiphanius. Epiphanius fuelled this conflict by ordaining a priest for Jerome's monastery at Bethlehem, thus trespassing on John's jurisdiction. This dispute continued during the 390s, in particular in the literary works by Rufinus and Jerome attacking one another.

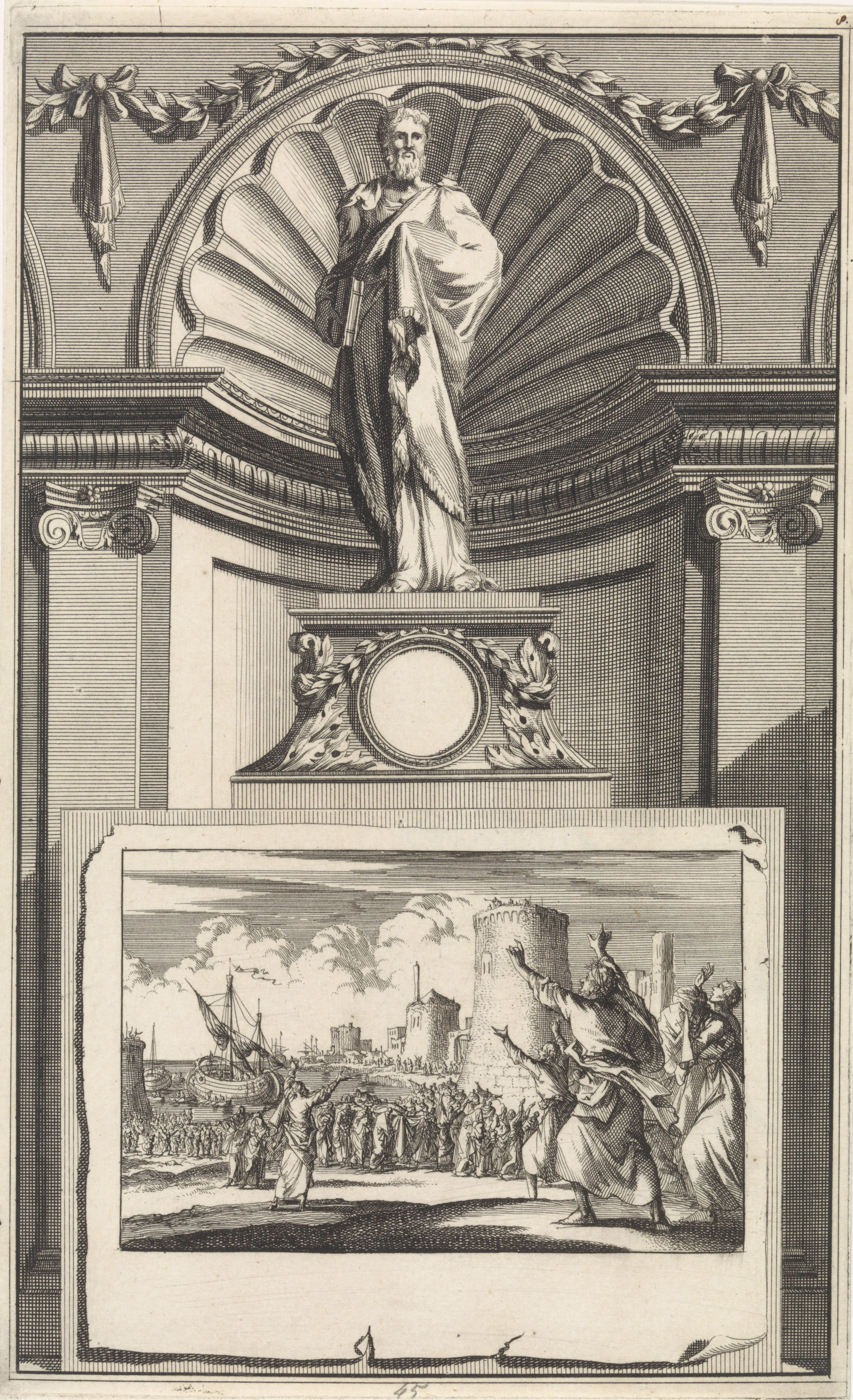
Engraving by Jan Luyken depicting Epiphanius and the return of his body to Constantinople

In 399, the dispute took on another dimension, when the Bishop of Alexandria, Theophilus, who had initially supported John, changed his views and started persecuting Origenist monks in Egypt. As a result of this persecution, four of these monks, the so-called Tall Brothers, fled to Palestine, and then travelled to Constantinople, seeking support and spreading the controversy. John Chrysostom, Bishop of Constantinople, gave the monks shelter, where they appealed to the Emperor. Theophilus saw his chance to use this event to bring down Chrysostom, who was his enemy: In 402 he summoned a council in Constantinople, and invited those supportive of his anti-Origenist views. Epiphanius, by this time nearly 80, was one of those summoned, and began the journey to Constantinople. However, when he realised he was being used as a tool by Theophilus against Chrysostom, Epiphanius started back to Salamis, and died on the way home in 403.

== The curtain incident ==
Letter LI in Jerome's letters gives Jerome's Latin translation, made at Epiphanius's request, of his letter, originally in Greek from c. 394, "From Epiphanius, Bishop of Salamis, in Cyprus, to John, Bishop of Jerusalem". The final section covers the often quoted incident of the curtain, which unlike other passages attributed to Epiphanius and quoted by the Iconoclasts, is accepted as authentic by modern scholars:

9. Moreover, I have heard that certain persons have this grievance against me: When I accompanied you to the holy place called Bethel, there to join you in celebrating the Collect, after the use of the Church, I came to a villa called Anablatha and, as I was passing, saw a lamp burning there. Asking what place it was, and learning it to be a church, I went in to pray, and found there a curtain hanging on the doors of the said church, dyed and embroidered. It bore an image either of Christ or of one of the saints; I do not rightly remember whose the image was. Seeing this, and being loth that an image of a man should be hung up in Christ's church contrary to the teaching of the Scriptures, I tore it asunder and advised the custodians of the place to use it as a winding sheet for some poor person. They, however, murmured, and said that if I made up my mind to tear it, it was only fair that I should give them another curtain in its place. As soon as I heard this, I promised that I would give one, and said that I would send it at once. Since then there has been some little delay, due to the fact that I have been seeking a curtain of the best quality to give to them instead of the former one, and thought it right to send to Cyprus for one. I have now sent the best that I could find, and I beg that you will order the presbyter of the place to take the curtain which I have sent from the hands of the Reader, and that you will afterwards give directions that curtains of the other sort—opposed as they are to our religion—shall not be hung up in any church of Christ. A man of your uprightness should be careful to remove an occasion of offence unworthy alike of the Church of Christ and of those Christians who are committed to your charge. Beware of Palladius of Galatia—a man once dear to me, but who now sorely needs God's pity—for he preaches and teaches the heresy of Origen; and see to it that he does not seduce any of those who are intrusted to your keeping into the perverse ways of his erroneous doctrine. I pray that you may fare well in the Lord.

== Writings ==
=== Panarion ===
His best-known book is the Panarion (from Latin panarium, "bread basket" < panis, "bread"), also known as Adversus Haereses, "Against Heresies", presented as a book of antidotes for those bitten by the serpent of heresy. Written between 374 and 377, it forms a handbook for dealing with the arguments of heretics.

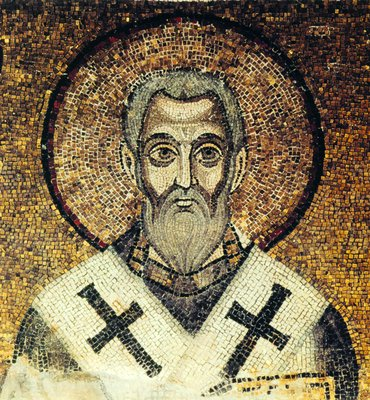
11th century depiction of St. Epiphanius in Saint Sophia Cathedral, Kyiv

It lists, and refutes, 80 heresies, some of which are not described in any other surviving documents from the time. Epiphanius begins with the 'four mothers' of pre-Christian heresy – 'barbarism', 'Scythism', 'Hellenism' and 'Judaism' – and then addresses the 16 pre-Christian heresies that have flowed from them; four philosophical schools (Stoics, Platonists, Pythagoreans and Epicureans), and 12 Jewish sects. There is then an interlude, telling of the Incarnation of the Word. After this, Epiphanius embarks on his account of the 60 Christian heresies, from assorted gnostics to the various trinitarian heresies of the fourth century, closing with the Collyridians and Messalians.

While Epiphanius often let his zeal come before facts – he admits on one occasion that he writes against the Origenists-based only on hearsay (Panarion, Epiphanius 71) – the Panarion is a valuable source of information on the Christian Church of the fourth century. It is also an important source regarding the early Jewish gospels such as the Gospel according to the Hebrews circulating among the Ebionites and the Nazarenes, as well as the followers of Cerinthus and Merinthus.

One unique feature of the Panarion is in the way that Epiphanius compares the various heretics to different poisonous beasts, going so far as to describe in detail the animal's characteristics, how it produces its poison, and how to protect oneself from the animal's bite or poison. For example, he describes his enemy Origen as "a toad noisy from too much moisture which keeps croaking louder and louder." He compares the Gnostics to a particularly dreaded snake "with no fangs." The Ebionites, a Christian sect that followed Jewish law, were described by Epiphanius as "a monstrosity with many shapes, who practically formed the snake-like shape of the mythical many-headed Hydra in himself." In all, Epiphanius describes fifty animals, usually one per sect.

Another feature of the Panarion is the access its earlier sections provide to lost works, including Justin Martyr's work on heresies, the Greek of Irenaeus's Against Heresies, and Hippolytus's Syntagma. The Panarion was first translated into English in 1987 and 1990.

=== Other works ===
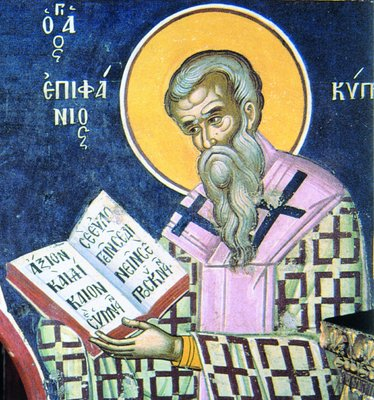
Fresco from Dionysiou Monastery

His earliest known work is the Ancoratus (the well anchored man), which includes arguments against Arianism and the teachings of Origen. Aside from the polemics by which he is known, Epiphanius wrote a work of biblical antiquarianism, called, for one of its sections, On Weights and Measures (περὶ μέτρων καὶ στάθμων). It was composed in Constantinople for a Persian priest, in 392, and survives in Syriac, Armenian, and Georgian translations (this last is found in Shatberd ms 1141 along with Physiologus and De Gemmis). The first section discusses the canon of the Old Testament and its versions, the second of measures and weights, and the third, the geography of Palestine. The texts appear not to have been given a polish but consist of rough notes and sketches, as Allen A. Shaw, a modern commentator, concluded; nevertheless Epiphanius's work on metrology was important in the history of measurement.

Another work, On the Twelve Gems (De Gemmis), survives in a number of fragments, the most complete of which is the Georgian. A letter written by Epiphanius to John II, Bishop of Jerusalem, in 394 and preserved in Jerome's translation exists. The collection of homilies traditionally ascribed to a "Saint Epiphanius, bishop" are dated in the late fifth or sixth century and are not connected with Epiphanius of Salamis by modern scholars.

Such was Epiphanius's reputation for learning that the Physiologus, the principal source of medieval bestiaries, came to be widely falsely attributed to him.

== Works ==
- The Panarion of Epiphanius of Salamis, Book I (Sects 1–46) Frank Williams, translator, 1987 (E.J. Brill, Leiden) ISBN 90-04-07926-2
- The Panarion of Epiphanius of Salamis, Book II and III (Sects 47–80, De Fide) Frank Williams, translator, 1993 (E.J. Brill, Leiden) ISBN 90-04-09898-4
- The Panarion of St. Epiphanius, Bishop of Salamis Philip R. Amidon, translator, 1990 (Oxford University Press, New York) (This translation contains selections rather than the full work.) ISBN 0-19-506291-4
- Epiphanius' Treatise on Weights and Measures: The Syriac Version, James Elmer Dean, ed, 1935. (Chicago) [English translation of On Weights and Measures; available at Epiphanius of Salamis, Weights and Measures (1935) pp.11-83. English translation
- Epiphanius de Gemmis: the Old Georgian Version and the Fragments of the Armenian Version. ed. Robert Pierpont Blake; de Vis, H. (1934). London: Christophers.
  - Epiphanius von Salamis, Über die zwölf Steine im hohepriesterlichen Brustschild (De duodecim gemmis rationalis). Nach dem Codex Vaticanus Borgianus Armenus 31 herausgegeben und übersetzt by Felix Albrecht and Arthur Manukyan (Gorgias Eastern Christian Studies 37), 2014 (Gorgias Press: Piscataway) ISBN 978-1-4632-0279-8 (German edition).
- Anacephalaiosis (originally thought to be the work of Epihanius of Salamis, although this opinion is now disputed).
