= Vice =

Immoral or depraved behavior or habit

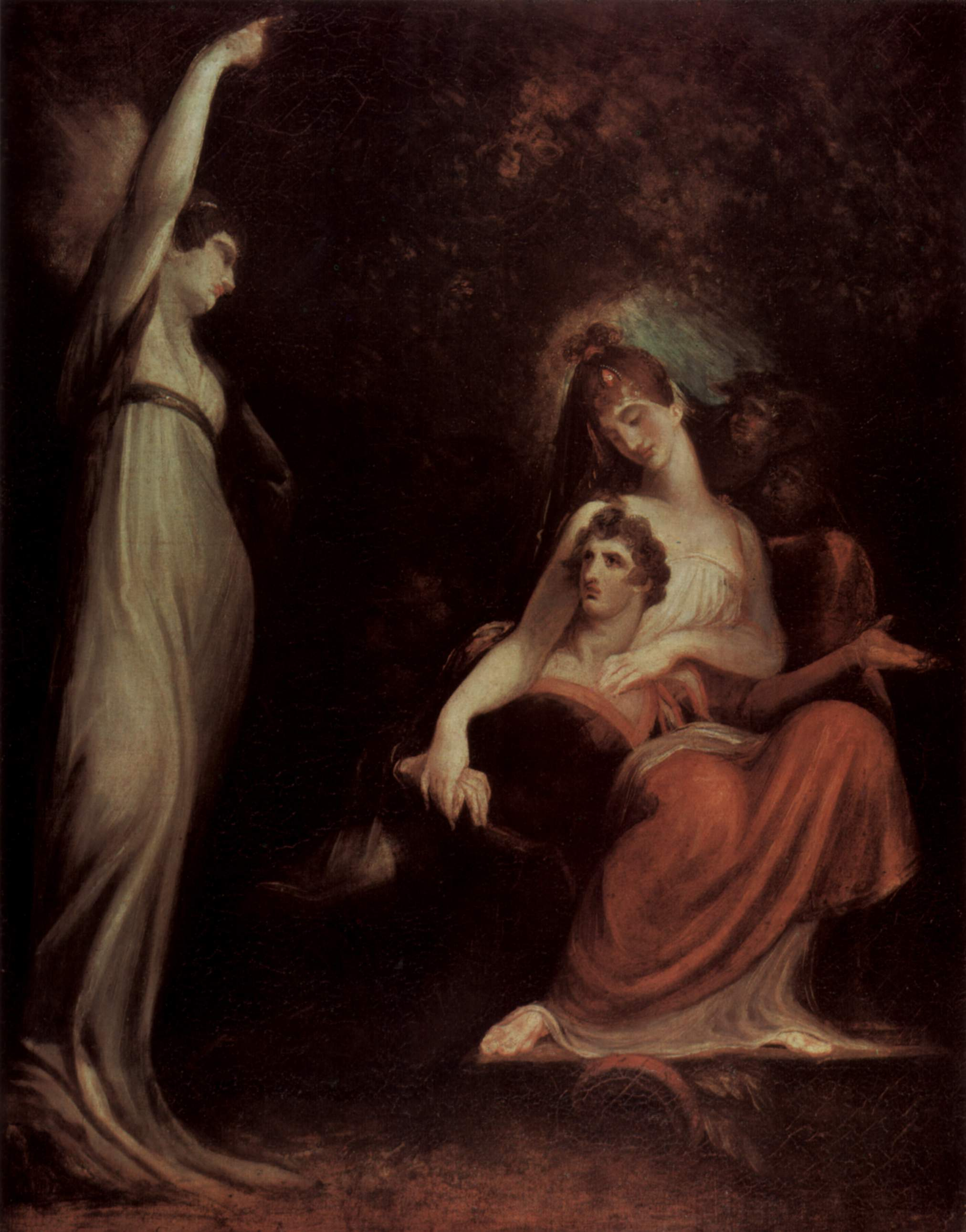
Henry Fuseli, Virtue reclaiming Youth from the arms of Vice, 1806–1807

A vice is a practice, behaviour, habit or item generally considered morally wrong in the associated society. In more minor usage, vice can refer to a fault, a negative character trait, a defect, an infirmity, or a bad or unhealthy habit. Vices are usually associated with a fault in a person's character or temperament rather than their morality.

Synonyms for vice include fault, sin, depravity, iniquity, wickedness, and corruption. The antonym of vice is virtue.

== Etymology ==
The modern English term that best captures its original meaning is the word vicious, which means "full of vice". In this sense, the word vice comes from the Latin word vitium, meaning "failing or defect".

== Law enforcement ==
Depending on the country or jurisdiction, vice crimes may or may not be treated as a separate category in the criminal codes. Even in jurisdictions where vice is not explicitly delineated in the legal code, the term vice is often used in law enforcement and judicial systems as an umbrella term for crimes involving activities that are considered inherently immoral, regardless of the legality or objective harm involved.

In the United Kingdom, the term vice is commonly used in law and law enforcement to refer to criminal offences related to prostitution and pornography. In the United States, the term is also used to refer to crimes related to drugs, alcohol, and gambling.

=== Vice squad ===
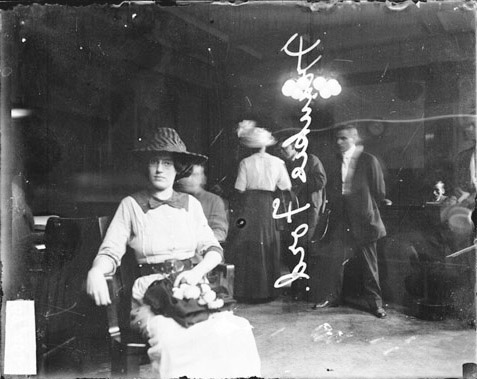
A 1912 portrait of Frankie Fore, sitting in a room during a vice raid in Calumet City (formerly known as West Hammond), Illinois.

In Saudi Arabia, the Committee for the Promotion of Virtue and the Prevention of Vice is the vice squad authority.

A vice squad, also called a vice unit or a morality squad, is generally, though not always, a police division, whose focus is to restrain or suppress moral crimes. Though what is considered or accepted as a moral crime by society often varies considerably according to local laws or customs between nations, countries, or states, it often includes activities such as gambling, narcotics, prostitution and pornography.

== Religion ==
Religious police, for example Islamic religious police units or sharia police in certain Muslim countries, are morality squads that also monitor, for example, dress codes, observance of store-closures during prayer time, consumption of unlawful beverages or foods, unrelated males and females socializing, and homosexual behaviour.

=== Buddhism ===
In the Sarvastivadin tradition of Buddhism, there are 108 defilements, or vices, which are prohibited. These are subdivided into 10 bonds and 98 proclivities. The 10 bonds are the following:

- Absence of shame
- Absence of embarrassment
- Jealousy
- Parsimony (in the sense of stinginess)
- Remorse
- Drowsiness
- Distraction
- Torpor
- Anger
- Concealment of wrongdoing

=== Judaism ===
Avoiding vice is an important theme in Jewish ethics, especially within musar literature.

=== Christianity ===
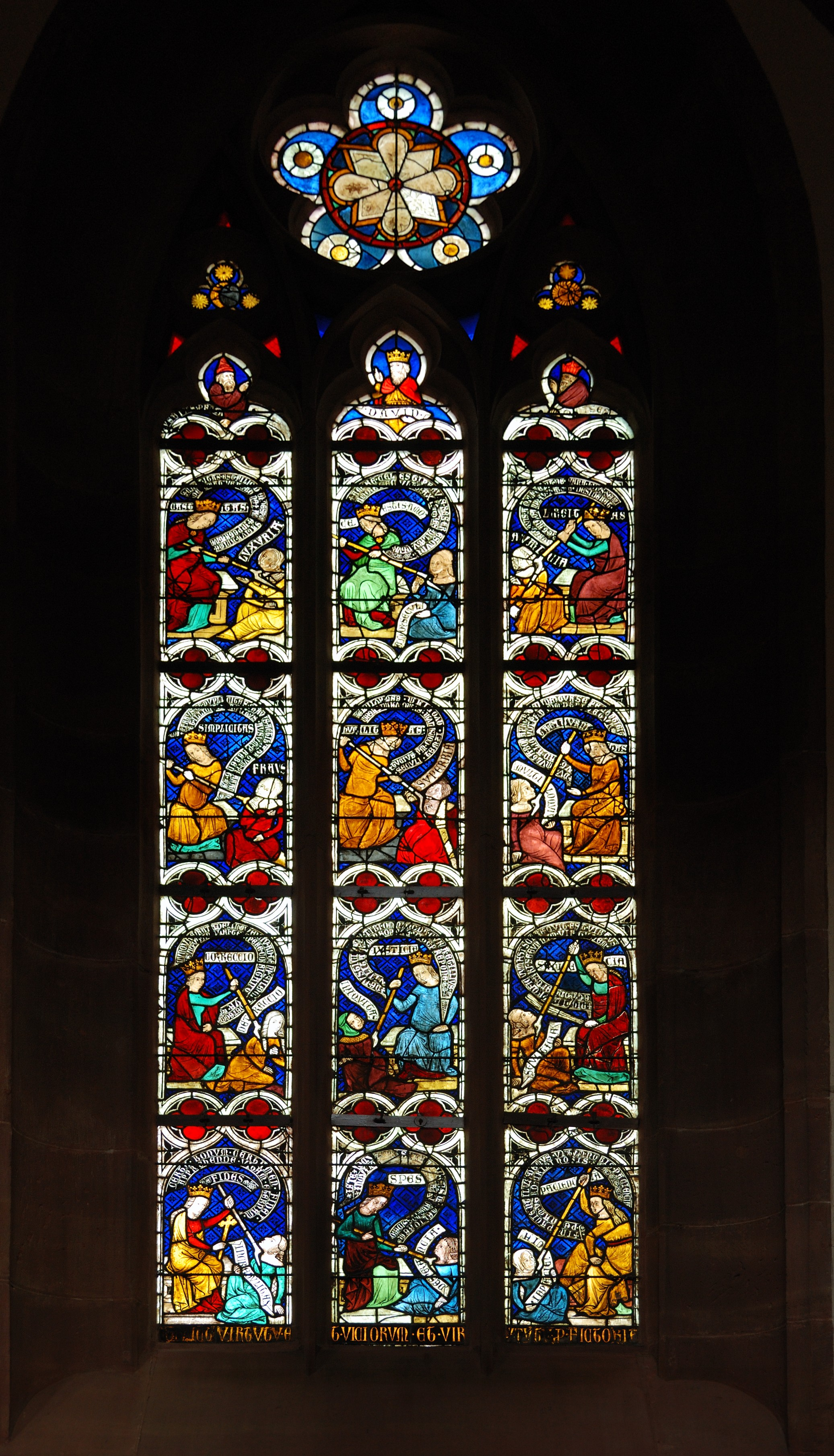
Virtues fighting vices, stained glass window (14th century) in the Niederhaslach Church

Christians believe there are two kinds of vice:

- Vices that come from the physical organism as instincts, which can become perverse (such as lust)
- Vices that come from false idolatry in the spiritual realm

The first kind of vice, though sinful, is believed less serious than the second. Vices recognized as spiritual by Christians include blasphemy (holiness betrayed), apostasy (faith betrayed), despair (hope betrayed), hatred (love betrayed), and indifference (scripturally, a "hardened heart"). Christian theologians have reasoned that the most destructive vice equates to a certain type of pride or the complete idolatry of the self. It is argued that through this vice, which is essentially competitive, all the worst evils come into being. In Christian theology, it originally led to the Fall of Man, and, as a purely diabolical spiritual vice, it outweighs anything else often condemned by the Church.

==== Roman Catholicism ====
The Roman Catholic Church distinguishes between vice, which is a habit of sin, and the sin itself, which is an individual morally wrong act. In Roman Catholicism, the word sin also refers to the state that befalls one upon committing a morally wrong act. In this section, the word always means the sinful act. It is the sin, and not the vice, that deprives one of God's sanctifying grace and renders one deserving of God's punishment. Thomas Aquinas taught that "absolutely speaking, the sin surpasses the vice in wickedness". On the other hand, even after a person's sins have been forgiven, the underlying habit (the vice) may remain. Just as vice was created in the first place by repeatedly yielding to the temptation to sin, so vice may be removed only by repeatedly resisting temptation and performing virtuous acts; the more entrenched the vice, the more time and effort needed to remove it. Saint Thomas Aquinas says that following rehabilitation and the acquisition of virtues, the vice does not persist as a habit, but rather as a mere disposition and one that is in the process of being eliminated. Medieval illuminated manuscripts circulated with colorful schemas for developing proper attitudes, with scriptural allusions modelled on nature: the tree of virtues as blossoming flowers or vices bearing sterile fruit, The Renaissance writer Pietro Bembo is credited with reaffirming and promoting the Christian perfection of classical humanism. Deriving all from love (or the lack thereof) his schemas were added as supplements in the newly invented technology of printing by Aldus Manutius in his editions of Dante's Divine Comedy dating from early in the 16th century.

=== Dante's seven deadly vices ===
The poet Dante Alighieri listed the following seven deadly vices, associating them structurally as flaws in the soul's inherent capacity for goodness as made in the Divine Image yet perverted by the Fall:

1. Pride or vanity: an excessive love of the self (holding the self outside of its proper position regarding God or fellows; Dante's definition was "love of self perverted to hatred and contempt for one's neighbour"). In the Latin lists of the Seven Deadly Sins, pride is referred to as superbia.
2. Envy or jealousy: resentment of others for their possessions (Dante: "love of one's own good perverted to a desire to deprive other men of theirs"). In the Latin lists of the Seven Deadly Sins, envy is referred to as invidia.
3. Wrath or anger: feelings of hatred, revenge or denial, as well as punitive desires outside of justice (Dante's description was "love of justice perverted to revenge and spite"). In the Latin lists of the Seven Deadly Sins, wrath is referred to as ira, which primitive vices tempt astray by increasingly perverting the proper purpose of charity, directing it inwards, leading to a disordered navel-gazing preoccupation with personal goods in isolation absent proper harmonious relations leading to violent disruption of balance with others.
4. Sloth or laziness: idleness and wastefulness of time or other allotted resources. Laziness is condemned because it results in others having to work harder; also, useful work will not be done. Sloth is referred to in Latin as accidie or acedia, which vice tempts a self-aware soul to be too easily satisfied, thwarting charity's purpose as insufficiently perceptible within the soul itself or abjectly indifferent in relationship with the needs of others and their satisfaction, an escalation in evil, more odious than the passion of hate
5. Avarice (covetousness, greed): a desire to possess more than one has need or use for (or according to Dante, "excessive love of money and power"). In the Latin lists of the Seven Deadly Sins, avarice is referred to as avaritia.
6. Gluttony: overindulgence in food, drink or intoxicants, or misplaced desire of food as a pleasure for its sensuality ("excessive love of pleasure" was Dante's rendering). In the Latin lists of the Seven Deadly Sins, gluttony is referred to as gula.
7. Lust: excessive sexual desire. Dante's criterion was that "lust detracts from true love". In the Latin lists of the Seven Deadly Sins, lust is referred to as luxuria, which vices tempt cultivated souls in their ability to direct charity's proper purpose to good things or actions, by indulging excess. Thus in Dante's estimation, the soul's detachment from sensual appetites become the vices most difficult to tame, urges not as easily curbed by mere good manners since inflamed via appropriate use rather than inappropriate misuse. Hence conventional respect for the ninth and tenth commandments against coveting and social customs that encourage custody of the eyes and ears become prudent adjuncts to training against vice.

The first three terraces of purgatory expiate the sins which can be considered to arise from love perverted, that is, sins which arise from the heart of the sinner being set upon something which is wrong in the eyes of God. Those being purged here must have their love set upon the right path. The fourth terrace of purgatory expiates the sins which can be considered to arise from love defective, that is, love which, although directed towards the correct subjects is too weak to drive the sinner to act as they should. Those being purged here must have their love strengthened so as to drive them correctly. The fifth, sixth, and seventh terraces of purgatory expiate the sins which can be considered to arise from love excessive, that is, love which although directed towards ends which God considers good is directed towards them too much for the sinner to gain bliss from them, and also so that the sinner is distracted from the love of other things of which God approves. Their love must be cooled to a more sensible level.

=== Islam ===
The Qur'an and many other Islamic religious writings provide prohibitions against acts that are seen as immoral.

Ibn abi Dunya, a 9th-century scholar and tutor to the caliphs, described 6 censures (prohibitions against vices) in his writings:

- Ire
- Envy
- Slander
- Obscenity
- Intoxicants
- Instruments of pleasure

=== Epicureanism ===
Although not strictly a religion but a Hellenistic philosophy, Epicurean ethics prescribes a therapeutic approach to the vices with the goal of attaining a life of pleasure with the aid of the virtues. Most of the techniques used in Epicureanism involve challenging false beliefs and attaining beliefs that are aligned with nature. In this, Epicureanism posits an entirely naturalistic, non-religious theory of virtue and vice based on the rational pursuit of pleasure.

== See also ==
- Catalogue of Vices and Virtues
- Golden mean (philosophy)
- Moral character

== Notes ==
- All etymologies are according to the Oxford English Dictionary.
