= James Hawkes (missionary) =

American missionary

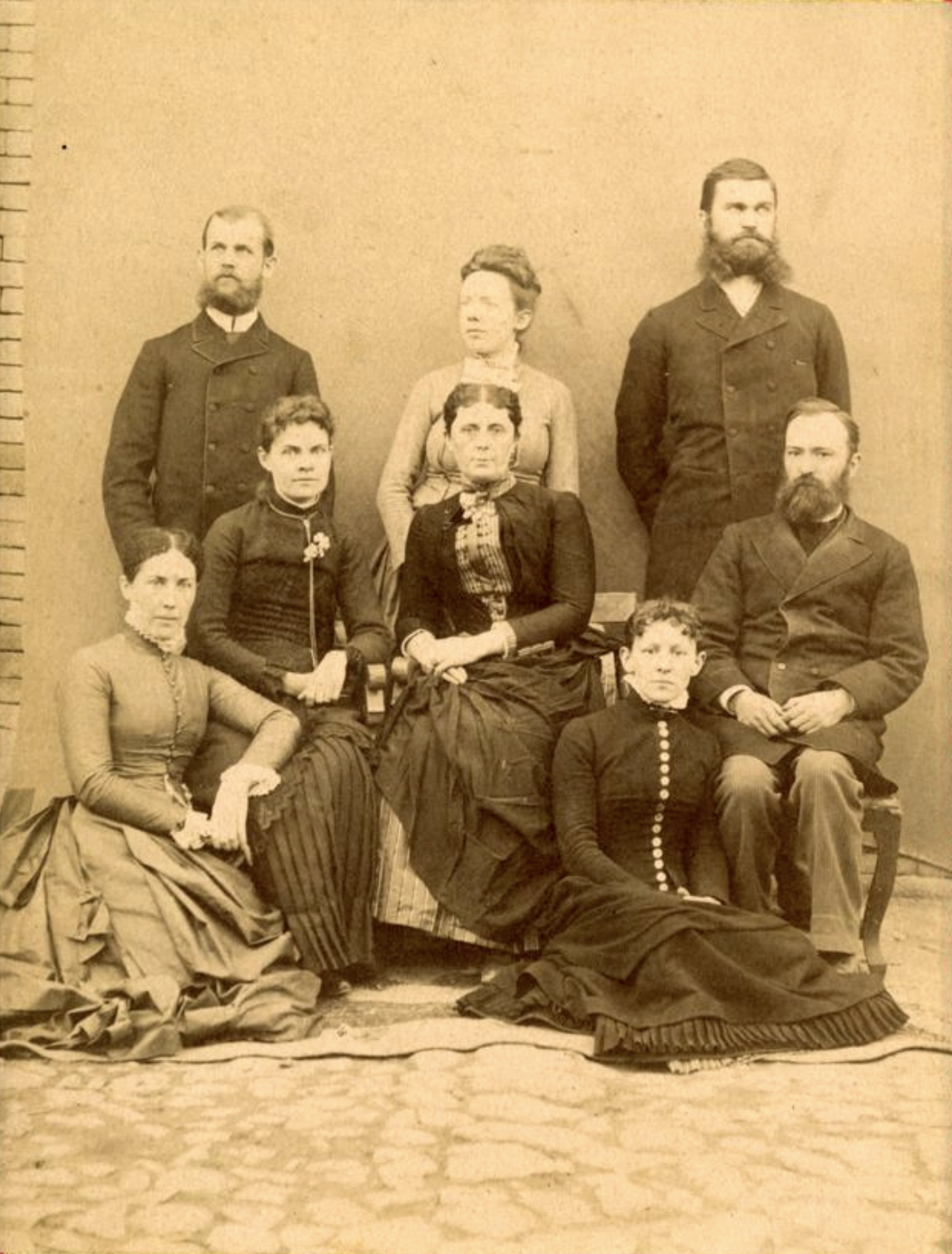
American Missionaries in Hamadan, Iran; with Sarah "Belle" Sherwood Hawkes sitting on floor at right and James W. Hawkes front above

James W. Hawkes (1853–1932), was an American minister, a missionary in Qajar Iran, and a founder of a school.

== Biography ==
James W. Hawkes was born in 1853 in Montezuma, Parke County, Indiana. He spent his formative years in nearby Rockville, Indiana. Hawkes spent two years at Wabash College before transferring to Princeton College, which granted him his undergraduate degree; he attended Union Theological Seminary in New York City in order to be trained as a missionary. In the early 1880s Hawkes began his career as a missionary in Persia.

He was married in 1884 to Sarah "Belle" Belknap (née Sherwood; 1854–1919), and they had a son a year later, which died shortly after birth. His wife managed the local girls schools, including the Faith Hubbard School for Girls in Hamadan, and later the Hamadan Jewish Girls' School. While doing missionary work in Persia, Hawkes’ wife died in 1919 from typhoid fever.

After his wife's death, Hawkes remained abroad and undertook the writing of the Persian Bible Dictionary (in Persian قاموس کتاب مقدس) and revisions of the Persian language Bible. Hawkes also founded the American School for Boys in Hamadan, Persia where he spent most of his missionary years. He died at the age of seventy-nine.
