= Persian Bible Dictionary =

Persian Bible Dictionary (Persian: قاموس کتاب مقدس) is a reference of Bible names in the Persian language. Author of the work was James W. Hawkes.
