= Persian Diatessaron =

The Persian Diatessaron of Iwannis ‛Izz al-Din of Tabriz is a 13th-century Gospel harmony, the earliest of the Bible translations into Persian. It appears to have been translated from a late copy of a Syriac harmony.
