= Bible translations into Persian =

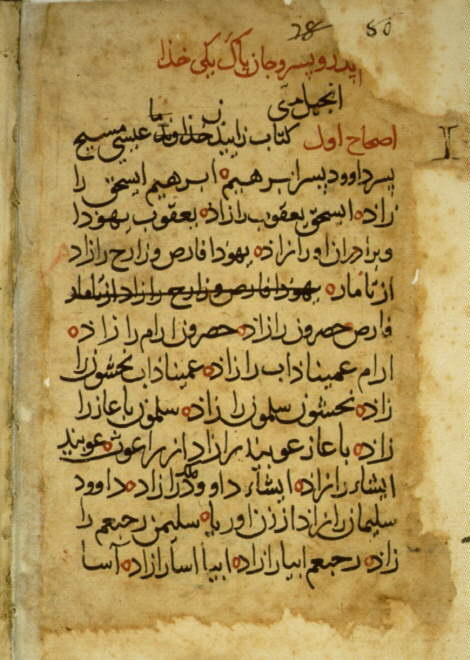

Bible translations into Persian Languages have been made since the fourth or fifth century, although few early manuscripts survive. There are both Jewish and Christian translations from the Middle Ages. Complete translations of the Hebrew Bible and Greek New Testament from original languages were first made in the 19th century by Protestant missionaries.

== Middle Persian ==
The only physical survival of pre-Islamic Persian Bible translations are two fragments of Psalms found by Albert von Le Coq found in the Shui pang monastery north of Bulayiq in 1905. These earliest translations into Persian are in the Pahlavi script.

== Medieval translation into New Persian ==
Parts of the Gospels were first translated into Persian in the Persian Diatessaron in the 13th century. Then more sections of the Gospels were translated by the 16th Century Muslim scholar and critic of Christianity Khatun Abadi.

== Modern translations ==
=== Persian Old Version (POV) ===
More recently, Henry Thomas Colebrooke's Four Gospels appeared in Calcutta in 1804. A major figure in this work was Henry Martyn, a contemporary of William Carey. In 1811 he journeyed into Persia (now Iran). Together with Mīrzā Sayyed ʿAlī Khan, he translated the New Testament, completing it in 1812. There he sent a copy of his translation of the New Testament to the Shah. It was published in 1815.

In 1845, translation of the Old Testament from Hebrew by William Glen and Mīrzā Moḥammad Jaʿfar was published in Edinburgh. In 1846, a complete Bible consisting of this Old Testament and Martyn's New Testament was published.

This translation was later revised by Robert Bruce to utilise Persian language that was more current. This was published in 1895, although it is also said to have been published in 1896. This is commonly used and known as the Old Persian Version (OPV), Standard Version or Tarjome-ye Qadim (ترجمه قدیم).

=== Persian Living Bible (PLB) ===
This is possibly a 1979 translation from the Living Bible by Living Bibles International.

=== Contemporary Translation (PCB) ===
Although it is currently illegal to distribute Christian literature in Persian, Persian Contemporary Translation, also known as Tarjome-ye Tafsiri (Interpretative Translation, ترجمه تفسیری) was published by the International Bible Society in 1995. It is a thought-for-thought translation. It is another commonly used translation. The version was revised and republished in 2003. in the YouVersion app this version is listed as tarjame moaser - contemporary translation (ketab moghodas, tarjamĥ̉ moaser کتاب مقدس، ترجمۀ معاصر) .

=== Today's Persian Version (TPV) ===
A new thought-for-thought New Testament translation, Common Language Translation, was first published in 1976. It is also known in Persian as Injil Sharif (Noble Gospel, انجیل شریف) and Mojdeh Baraye Asre Jadid (Good News for A New Age, مژده برای عصر جدید). It is largely based on Henry Martyn's work. Translation of the Old Testament was not completed until much later. When it was finished, it was published by United Bible Societies in 2007. This complete translation is known as Today's Persian Version (TPV) and Today's Farsi.

=== New Millennium Version (NMV) ===
This version is called "New Millennium Version" (NMV) or "Tarjome-ye Hezâre-ye now" (ترجمه هزارۀ نو). This translation of the Bible in Persian was completed and published in 22nd of Sep 2014. This translation was made and published by the UK-based Elam Ministries, This translation is also available on E-sword and a mobile version has also been made.

=== New World Translation of the Holy Scriptures ===
A translation of the New Testament in modern Persian was released by Jehovah's Witnesses in 2014.

=== Pirouz Sayyar ===
A non-missionary version of New Testament (2008), Old Testament (2014) and Deuterocanonical books (2003) is translated by Iranian translator and researcher, Pirouz Sayyar and published in Tehran.

=== Persian Dayspring Version (PDV) ===
"Dayspring" (سپیده دم) is a translation project of the "New Testament" from the original Greek text into Persian. As of now only the translation of the Gospel of John has been completed and published online. This version emphasizes Persian words and terms while avoiding foreign words and terms, particularly those from Arabic, as much as possible.

== Dari (Afghan Persian) ==
Dari (Persian: دری, Darī, pronounced [dæˈɾi]) refers to the version of Persian language spoken in Afghanistan, and hence known as Afghan Persian in some western sources. As defined in the Constitution of Afghanistan, Dari is one of the two official languages of Afghanistan. Spoken by almost half of the population as first language, it also serves as the lingua franca in Afghanistan. The Iranian and Afghan dialects of Persian are mutually intelligible to a relatively high degree. Differences are found primarily in the vocabulary and phonology.

Dari, spoken in Afghanistan, should not be confused with Dari or Gabri of Iran, a language of the Central Iranian sub-group, spoken in some Zoroastrian communities.

Scripture portions were published in Dari for the first time in 1974. In 1982 the complete New Testament was published for the first time by the Pakistan Bible Society in Lahore. This translation had been translated by an Afghan convert to Christianity, Zia Nodrat using Iranian Persian, English and German versions. Its third edition was published by the Cambridge University Press in England in 1989. Zia Nodrat was working on a Dari translation of the Old Testament, when he disappeared under mysterious circumstances. The complete Bible in Dari was published for the first time in 2008 titled "Today's Dari Version" (TDV08). New revision efforts are underway to modernize this volume. As of September 2022, the NT is available online as TDV22.

== Tajiki (Persian of Tajikistan) ==
Versions in the Tajik language have appeared since the breakup of the Soviet Union into the independent republics of Central Asia.

In 2021 during the CoVID-19 pandemic Jehovah's Witnesses released virtually the New World Translation of the Holy Scriptures in Tajiki Cyrillic. Some translators from several countries worked 4 years to complete the translation.

== Comparisons table ==
Translation	John 3:16
Persian Diatessaron 13th Century	« همچنین خدا خلق را دوست داشت که پسر یگانه خود جهت خلق فدی کرد بهر آنک هرک بدو ایمان بیاورد هلاک مشود بلی زندگانی جاوید پذیرد
Tarjumeh-ye Khatun Abadi 16th century	« و خدا دوست داشته عالم را به حدی که بخشیده پسر یگانه خود را تا هلاک نشود کسی که ایمان آورد به او، بلکه بوده باشد او را حیات ابدی.
Tarjumeh-ye Henry Martyn 1876	« زیرا که خدا آن قدر جهان را دوست داشت که فرزند یگانه خود را ارزانی فرمود که تا هر کس که بر او ایمان آورد هلاک نشود بلکه زندگانی جاوید یابند.
Tarjumeh-ye Ghadeem 1896	زیرا خدا جهان را اینقدر محبت نمود که پسر یگانه خود را داد تا هر‌که بر او ایمان آورد هلاک نگردد بلکه حیات جاودانی یابد.
Today's Persian Version (TPV)	زیرا خدا جهانیان را آن‌قدر محبّت نمود كه پسر یگانهٔ خود را داد تا هرکه به او ایمان بیاورد هلاک نگردد، بلكه صاحب حیات جاودان شود.
Tarjumeh-ye Hezare Noh (NMV)	«زیرا خدا جهان را آنقدر محبت کرد که پسر یگانة خود را داد تا هر که به او ایمان آوَرَد هلاک نگردد، بلکه حیات جاویدان یابد.
Tarjumeh-ye Hezare Noh (NMV) (Cyrillic transcription)	Зеро Худо ҷаҳонро онқадар меҳаббат кард, ки Писари ягонаи Худро дод, то ҳар кӣ ба Ӯ имон оварад, ҳалок накардад, балки ҳаёти ҷовидонӣ ёбад.
Tarjumeh-ye Tafsiri (FCB)	« زیرا خدا بقدری مردم جهان را دوست دارد که یگانه فرزند خود را فرستاده است، تا هر که به او ایمان آورد، هلاک نشود بلکه زندگی جاوید بیابد.
Tarjumeh-ye Pirouz Sayar	« چه خدا چندان جهان را دوست داشته است که پسر خویش، آن پسر یگانه، را بداده تا ان کس که بر او ایمان آوَرد هلاک نگردد. بلکه حیات جاودان یابد.
Tarjumeh-ye Sepeedeh Dam (PDV)	زیرا خداوند جهان را چنان دوست داشت، که پسر یگانه خویش را بداد، تا هر که به او باور آورد نیست نگردد، ونکه زندگانی جاودان یابد.
Today's Dari Version 2008	زیرا خدا به دنیا آنقدر محبت داشت که پسر یگانۀ خود را داد تا هر که به او ایمان بیاورد هلاک نگردد، بلکه صاحب زندگی ابدی شود.
Today's Dari Version 2022	خدا به جهان آنقدر محبت داشت که پسر یگانۀ خود را داد تا هر کی به او ایمان بیاورد هلاک نگردد، بلکه صاحب زندگی ابدی شود.
Institute for Bible Translation 1997 (Tajiki)	«Зеро Худо ҷаҳонро чунон дӯст дошт, ки Писари ягонаи Худро дод, то ҳар кӣ ба Ӯ имон оварад, талаф нашавад, балки ҳаёти ҷовидонӣ ёбад.
Institute for Bible Translation 2010 (Tajiki)	«Зеро Худо ҷаҳонро чунон дӯст дошт, ки Писари ягонаи Худро дод, то ҳар кӣ ба Ӯ имон оварад, намирад, балки ҳаёти абадӣ дошта бошад.
New World Translation 2021 (Tajiki)	«Худо ҷаҳонро чунон дӯст дошт, ки Писари ягоназодиa худро дод,л то ҳар кӣ ба ӯ имон дошта бошадb, нобуд нашавад, балки соҳиби ҳаёти ҷовидонӣ гардад.

== See also ==
- James Hawkes (missionary)

== Relevant literature ==
- Thomas, Kenneth with Ali-Ashghar Aghbar. 2015. A Restless Search: A History of Persian Translations of the Bible. (History of Bible Translation, 3.) American Bible Society.
