= Catalogue of Vices and Virtues =

Several New Testament passages contain lists that have come to be labeled Catalogues of Vices and Virtues by scholars.

The catalogue form was extremely popular in 1st-century AD Hellenism. Plato wrote the earliest catalogue. Such catalogs could easily be adapted for a range of philosophies and ethics. Philo, a hellenized Jew, also wrote several.

There is surprisingly little difference between the Christian and non-Christian catalogues. The longest list is in the Epistle to the Galatians and every item is common among non-Christian catalogues except one. Catalogues vary by size, content, and style. There was, apparently, little interest in Christians for creativity, systemization, or completeness. Their primary function, therefore, was to show that Christian morality should approximately conform to the well accepted morality of Hellenism. Therefore, the catalogues should not be considered creedal or specifically Christian.

== Early Christian catalogues ==
- Romans 1:29–31
- Romans 13:13
- 1 Corinthians 5:10
- 1 Corinthians 6:9
- 2 Corinthians 12:20
- Galatians 5:19–23
- Ephesians 4:31
- Colossians 3:5, 8
- 1 Timothy 1:9
- 2 Timothy 3:2–5
- Titus 3:3
- 1 Peter 2:1
- 1 Peter 4:3
- 1 Peter 4:15
- Apocalypse of Peter
- Didache
- Epistle of Barnabas 2:2–3

== Later Christian catalogues ==
- O'Reilly, Bernard (1897). "Sayings of Brother Giles, one of the First Disciples of St. Francis of Assisi: On Vices and Virtues." . Beautiful pearls of Catholic truth. Henry Sphar & Co.
- Cassian, John (1894). "St. John Cassian: On the Eight Vices". The Conferences of John Cassian.

== See also ==
- Aristotle's list of virtues
- Seven deadly sins – Set of vices in Christian theology
- Seven virtues – Seven virtues in Christian tradition

== Sources ==
- Betz, Hans Dieter (1979). Galatians. Philadelphia: Fortress Press. pp. 281–283.
