= Nag Hammadi and Manichaean Studies =

Academic book series

- Edited by: Jason D. BeDuhn, Dylan M. Burns, Johannes van Oort
- Original title: Nag Hammadi Studies
- Country: Netherlands
- Language: English, German, French
- Discipline: History of religion, philology
- Publisher: Brill Publishers
- Published: 1971–present
- Media type: Print, digital
- No. of books: 106
- Website: Official webpage

Nag Hammadi and Manichaean Studies (NHMS; ISSN 0929-2470) is an academic book series on Gnosticism, the Nag Hammadi library, Manichaeism, and related subjects. The series was founded as Nag Hammadi Studies (NHS; ISSN 0169-7749) in 1971 and is published by Brill. The series includes monographs, conference proceedings, festschrifts, collected papers, and bibliographies published in English, German, and French.

== History ==
The original Nag Hammadi Studies (NHS), published since 1971, was edited by James M. Robinson, Martin Krause, and Frederik W. Wisse and included volumes 1–31 and 34–35.

In 1993, the series was renamed as Nag Hammadi and Manichaean Studies due to the addition of books on Manichaeism. As of 2023, the series editors are Jason D. BeDuhn, Dylan M. Burns, and Johannes van Oort. The volumes are 32–33 and 36 onwards. The latest volume number is 106 as of December 2023.

Some of the volumes are currently part of the online Coptic Gnostic Library.

== Volumes ==
Volume	Year	Subject	Type	Title	Author(s) or editor(s)	ISBN	Language
1	1971	Nag Hammadi	Bibliography	Nag Hammadi Bibliography, 1948-1969	David Scholer	ISBN 978-90-04-02603-2	
2	1972	Gnosticism		L'évangile de vérité	Jacques-Étienne Ménard	ISBN 978-90-04-03408-2	French
3	1972	Nag Hammadi	Festschrift	Essays on the Nag Hammadi Texts in Honour of Alexander Böhlig	Martin Krause	ISBN 978-90-04-03535-5	
4	1975	Nag Hammadi		Nag Hammadi Codices III, 2 and IV, 2: The Gospel of the Egyptians. (The Holy Book of the Great Invisible Spirit). Edited with Translation and Commentary	Alexander Böhlig, Frederik Wisse	ISBN 978-90-04-04226-1	
5	1975	Nag Hammadi		L'Évangile selon Thomas: Tr. française, introduction, et commentaire par J.-É. Ménard	Jacques-Étienne Ménard	ISBN 978-90-04-04210-0	French
6	1975	Nag Hammadi	Festschrift	Essays on the Nag Hammadi Texts in Honour of Pahor Labib	Martin Krause	ISBN 978-90-04-04363-3	
7	1974	Nag Hammadi		Les textes de Nag Hammadi: Colloque du Centre d'Histoire des Religions. Strasbourg, 23-25 octobre 1974	Jacques-Étienne Ménard	ISBN 978-90-04-04359-6	French
8	1977	Gnosticism	Conference proceedings	Gnosis and Gnosticism: Papers Read at the Seventh International Conference on Patristic Studies. Oxford, September 8th-13th 1975	Martin Krause	ISBN 978-90-04-05242-0	
9	1978	Gnosticism		Pistis Sophia	Carl Schmidt	ISBN 978-90-04-05635-0	
10	1978	Gnosticism		The Enthronement of Sabaoth: Jewish Elements in Gnostic Creation Myths	Francis T. Fallon	ISBN 978-90-04-05683-1	
11	1979	Nag Hammadi		Nag Hammadi Codices V, 2-5 and VI with Papyrus Berolinensis 8502, 1 and 4	Douglas M. Parrott	ISBN 978-90-04-05798-2	
12	1978	Gnosticism		Die Polemik der Gnostiker gegen das kirchliche Christentum: Unter besonderer Berücksichtigung der Nag Hammadi-Traktate 'Apokalypse des Petrus' (NHC VII, 3) und 'Testimonium Veritatis' (NHC IX, 3)	Klaus Koschorke	ISBN 978-90-04-05709-8	German
13	1978	Gnosticism		The Books of Jeu and the Untitled Text in the Bruce Codex	Carl Schmidt	ISBN 978-90-04-05754-8	
14	1978	Nag Hammadi	Conference proceedings	Nag Hammadi and Gnosis: Papers Read at the First International Congress of Coptology (Cairo, December 1976)	R. McL. Wilson	ISBN 978-90-04-05760-9	
15	1981	Nag Hammadi		Nag Hammadi Codices IX and X	Birger Pearson	ISBN 978-90-04-06377-8	
16	1981	Nag Hammadi		Nag Hammadi Codices. Greek and Coptic Papyri from the Cartonnage of the Covers	J. W. B. Barns, G. M. Browne, J. C. Shelton	ISBN 978-90-04-06277-1	
17	1981	Nag Hammadi	Conference proceedings	Gnosis and Gnosticism: Papers Read at the Eighth International Conference on Patristic Studies, Oxford, September 3rd-8th, 1979	Martin Krause	ISBN 978-90-04-06399-0	
18	1984	Nag Hammadi		Die Anapausis im Evangelium Veritatis: Eine vergleichende Untersuchung des valentinianisch-gnostischen Heilsgutes der Ruhe im Evangelium Veritatis und in anderen Schriften der Nag-Hammadi Bibliothek	Jan Helderman	ISBN 978-90-04-07260-2	German
19	1984	Gnosticism		Hellenistische Erlösung in christlicher Deutung: Die gnostische Naassenerschrift. Quellen kritische Studien - Strukturanalyse - Schichten scheidung - Rekonstruktion der Anthropos - Lehr-schrift	Josef Frickel	ISBN 978-90-04-07227-5	German
20	2003	Nag Hammadi		Nag Hammadi Codex II, 2-7, together with XIII, 2* Brit. Lib. Or. 4926(1) and P. Oxy. 1, 654, 655: I. Gospel According to Thomas, Gospel According to Philip, Hypostasis of the Archons, Indexes	Bentley Layton	ISBN 978-90-04-09019-4	
21	2003	Nag Hammadi		Nag Hammadi Codex II, 2-7, together with XIII, 2* Brit. Lib. Or. 4926(1) and P. Oxy. 1, 654, 655: II. On the Origin of the World, Expository Treatise on the Soul, Book of Thomas the Contender	Bentley Layton	ISBN 978-90-04-09019-4	
22	1985	Nag Hammadi		Nag Hammadi Codex I (The Jung Codex): I. Introductions, Texts, Translations, Indices	Harold W. Attridge	ISBN 978-90-04-07677-8	
23	1985	Nag Hammadi		Nag Hammadi Codex I (The Jung Codex): II. Notes	Harold W. Attridge	ISBN 978-90-04-07678-5	
24	1984	Gnosticism		Another Seed: Studies in Gnostic Mythology	Guy Stroumsa	ISBN 978-90-04-07419-4	
25	1985	Nag Hammadi		L'exégèse de l'âme: Nag Hammadi Codex II, 6. Introduction, traduction et commentaire	Madeleine Scopello	ISBN 978-90-04-07469-9	French
26	1984	Nag Hammadi		Nag Hammadi Codex III, 5: The Dialogue of the Savior	Stephen Emmel	ISBN 978-90-04-07558-0	
27	1991	Nag Hammadi		Nag Hammadi Codices III, 3-4 and V,1 with Papyrus Berolinensis 8502,3 and Oxyrhynchus Papyrus 1081: Eugnostos and the Sophia of Jesus Christ	Douglas M. Parrott	ISBN 978-90-04-08366-0	
28	1990	Nag Hammadi		Nag Hammadi Codices XI, XII, XIII	Charles W. Hedrick	ISBN 978-90-04-07825-3	
29	1985	Gnosticism		The Immovable Race: A Gnostic Designation and the Theme of Stability in Late Antiquity	Frank Williams	ISBN 978-90-04-07597-9	
30	1995	Nag Hammadi		Nag Hammadi Codex VII	Birger Pearson	ISBN 978-90-04-10451-8	
31	1991	Nag Hammadi		Nag Hammadi Codex VIII	John H. Sieber	ISBN 978-90-04-09477-2	
32	1997	Nag Hammadi	Bibliography	Nag Hammadi Bibliography 1970-1994	David Scholer	ISBN 978-90-04-09473-4	
33	1995	Nag Hammadi		The Apocryphon of John: Synopsis of Nag Hammadi Codices II,1 - III,1 and IV,1 with BG 8502,2	Michael Waldstein, Frederik Wisse	ISBN 978-90-04-10395-5	
34	1987	Nag Hammadi		Les logia de la vie dans l'Evangile selon Thomas: A la recherche d'une tradition et d'une rédaction	Margaretha Lelyveld	ISBN 978-90-04-07610-5	French
35	1997	Gnosticism		The Panarion of Epiphanius of Salamis: Book I (Sects 1-46)	Frank Williams	ISBN 978-90-04-07926-7	
36	1993	Gnosticism		The Panarion of Epiphanius of Salamis, Book II and III: Book II and III (Sects 47-80, De Fide)	Frank Williams	ISBN 978-90-04-09898-5	
37	1995	Manichaeism		The Kephalaia of the Teacher: The Edited Coptic Manichaean Texts in Translation with Commentary	Iain Gardner	ISBN 978-90-04-10248-4	
38	1996	Nag Hammadi		The Gospel According to Philip: The Sources and Coherence of an Early Christian Collection	Martha Turner	ISBN 978-90-04-10443-3	
39	1996	Gnosticism	Collected papers	Studies in Gnosticism and Alexandrian Christianity	Roelof van den Broek	ISBN 978-90-04-10654-3	
40	1996	Nag Hammadi		The Woman Jesus Loved: Mary Magdalene in the Nag Hammadi Library and Related Documents	Antti Marjanen	ISBN 978-90-04-10658-1	
41	1996	Gnosticism		Heralds of That Good Realm: Syro-Mesopotamian Gnosis and Jewish Traditions	John Reeves	ISBN 978-90-04-10459-4	
42	1996	Gnosticism		Gnosis und Spätantike Religionsgeschichte: Gesammelte Aufsätze	Kurt Rudolph	ISBN 978-90-04-10625-3	German
43	1997	Manichaeism		Emerging from Darkness: Studies in the Recovery of Manichaean Sources	Paul Mirecki, Jason BeDuhn	ISBN 978-90-04-10760-1	
44	1997	Nag Hammadi	Conference proceedings	The Nag Hammadi Library after Fifty Years: Proceedings of the 1995 Society of Biblical Literature Commemoration	John D. Turner, Anne McGuire	ISBN 978-90-04-10824-0	
45	1998	Manichaeism		Manichaeism in Central Asia and China	Samuel Lieu	ISBN 978-90-04-10405-1	
46	1998	Manichaeism	Collected papers	Studies in Manichaean Literature and Art	Manfred Heuser, Hans-Joachim Klimkeit	ISBN 978-90-04-10716-8	
47	1999	Nag Hammadi		Jesu Lehren im Thomasevangelium	Thomas Zöckler	ISBN 978-90-04-11445-6	German
48	1999	Gnosticism		"Zerstört die Werke der Weiblichkeit": Maria Magdalena, Salome und andere Jüngerinnen Jesu in christlich-gnostischen Schriften	Silke Petersen	ISBN 978-90-04-11449-4	German
49	2001	Manichaeism	Conference proceedings	Augustine and Manichaeism in the Latin West: Proceedings of the Fribourg-Utrecht Symposium of the International Symposium Association of Manichaean Studies (IAMS)	Johannes van Oort, Otto Wermelinger, Gregor Wurst	ISBN 978-90-04-11423-4	
50	2001	Manichaeism		The Light and the Darkness: Studies in Manichaeism and its World	Paul Mirecki, Jason BeDuhn	ISBN 978-90-04-11673-3	
51	2001	Nag Hammadi		Mental Perception: A Commentary on NHC, VI, 4, The Concept of Our Great Power	Frank Williams	ISBN 978-90-04-11692-4	
52	2006	Nag Hammadi		Poetics of the Gnostic Universe: Narrative and Cosmology in the Apocryphon of John	Zlatko Pleše	ISBN 978-90-04-11674-0	
53	2005	Manichaeism		Femme, Gnose et Manichéisme: De l'espace mythique au territoire du réel	Madeleine Scopello	ISBN 978-90-04-11452-4	French
54	2002	Gnosticism	Festschrift	For the Children, Perfect Instruction: Studies in Honor of Hans-Martin Schenke on the Occasion of the Berliner Arbeitskreis für koptisch-gnostische Schriften's Thirtieth Year	Hans-Gebhard Bethge, Stephen Emmel, Karen King, Imke Schletterer	ISBN 978-90-04-12672-5	
55	2008	Gnosticism	Collected papers	Gnostica, Judaica, Catholica. Collected Essays of Gilles Quispel	Gilles Quispel, Johannes van Oort	ISBN 978-90-04-13945-9	
56	2004	Manichaeism		Demonstrative Proof in Defence of God: A Study of Titus of Bostra's Contra Manichaeos — The Work's Sources, Aims and Relation to its Contemporary Theology	Nils Arne Pedersen	ISBN 978-90-04-13883-4	
57	2005	Manichaeism		Mediaeval Manichaean Book Art: A Codicological Study of Iranian and Turkic Illuminated Book Fragments from 8th-11th Century East Central Asia	Zsuzsanna Gulácsi	ISBN 978-90-04-13994-7	
58	2005	Gnosticism		Gnostic Revisions of Genesis Stories and Early Jesus Traditions	Gerard P. Luttikhuizen	ISBN 978-90-04-14510-8	
59	2005	Nag Hammadi		Thomasine Traditions in Antiquity: The Social and Cultural World of the Gospel of Thomas	Jon Ma. Asgeirsson, April DeConick, Risto Uro	ISBN 978-90-04-14779-9	
60	2005	Gnosticism		The Spiritual Seed — The Church of the 'Valentinians'	Einar Thomassen	ISBN 978-90-04-14802-4	
61	2007	Manichaeism		Frontiers of Faith: The Christian Encounter with Manichaeism in the Acts of Archelaus	Jason BeDuhn, Paul Mirecki	ISBN 978-90-04-16180-1	
62	2008	Gnosticism	Conference proceedings	The Gospel of Judas in Context: Proceedings of the First International Conference on the Gospel of Judas, Paris, Sorbonne, October 27th-28th, 2006	Madeleine Scopello	ISBN 978-90-04-16721-6	
63	2008	Gnosticism		The Panarion of Epiphanius of Salamis: Book I: (Sects 1-46) Second Edition, Revised and Expanded	Frank Williams	ISBN 978-90-04-17017-9	
64	2009	Manichaeism	Conference proceedings	New Light on Manichaeism: Papers from the Sixth International Congress on Manichaeism	Jason BeDuhn	ISBN 978-90-04-17285-2	
65	2008	Nag Hammadi	Bibliography	Nag Hammadi Bibliography 1995-2006	David Scholer, Susan Wood	ISBN 978-90-04-17240-1	
66	2009	Manichaeism		Pentadic Redaction in the Manichaean Kephalaia	Timothy Pettipiece	ISBN 978-90-04-17436-8	
67	2009	Gnosticism		Valentinian Ethics and Paraenetic Discourse: Determining the Social Function of Moral Exhortation in Valentinian Christianity	Philip L. Tite	ISBN 978-90-04-17507-5	
68	2009	Gnosticism		Paradise Reconsidered in Gnostic Mythmaking: Rethinking Sethianism in Light of the Ophite Evidence	Tuomas Rasimus	ISBN 978-90-04-17323-1	
69	2009	Manichaeism		Manichaeism and Its Legacy	J. Kevin Coyle	ISBN 978-90-04-17574-7	
70	2009	Manichaeism		Biblical Argument in Manichaean Missionary Practice: The Case of Adimantus and Augustine	Jacob Albert van den Berg	ISBN 978-90-04-18034-5	
71	2009	Gnosticism		The Codex Judas Papers: Proceedings of the International Congress on the Tchacos Codex Held at Rice University, Houston Texas, March 13–16, 2008	April D. DeConick	ISBN 978-90-04-18141-0	
72	2010	Nag Hammadi		The Paraphrase of Shem (NH VII,1): Introduction, Translation and Commentary	Michel Roberge	ISBN 978-90-04-18202-8	
73	2010	Nag Hammadi		Images of Rebirth: Cognitive Poetics and Transformational Soteriology in the Gospel of Philip and the Exegesis on the Soul	Hugo Lundhaug	ISBN 978-90-04-18026-0	
74	2010	Manichaeism	Festschrift	In Search of Truth. Augustine, Manichaeism and other Gnosticism: Studies for Johannes van Oort at Sixty	Jacob Albert van den Berg, Annemaré Kotzé, Tobias Nicklas, Madeleine Scopello	ISBN 978-90-04-18997-3	
75	2011	Gnosticism		Gnosis und Judentum: Alttestamentliche und jüdische Motive in der gnostischen Literatur und das Ursprungsproblem der Gnosis	Jaan Lahe	ISBN 978-90-04-20618-2	German
76	2011	Nag Hammadi	Festschrift	Mystery and Secrecy in the Nag Hammadi Collection and Other Ancient Literature: Ideas and Practices: Studies for Einar Thomassen at Sixty	Christian H. Bull, Liv Lied, John D. Turner	ISBN 978-90-04-21207-7	
77	2012	Hermeticism		La voie d'Hermès: Pratiques rituelles et traités hermétiques	Anna Van den Kerchove	ISBN 978-90-04-22345-5	French
78	2012	Gnosticism	Festschrift	Der Same Seths: Hans-Martin Schenkes Kleine Schriften zu Gnosis, Koptologie und Neuem Testament	Gesine Schenke Robinson, Gesa Schenke, Uwe-Karsten Plisch	ISBN 978-90-04-22390-5	German
79	2012	Gnosticism		The Panarion of Epiphanius of Salamis, Books II and III. De Fide: Second, revised edition	Frank Williams	ISBN 978-90-04-22841-2	
80	2012	Manichaeism		Die Bibel bei den Manichäern und verwandte Studien von Alexander Böhlig†	Peter Nagel, Siegfried Richter	ISBN 978-90-04-23334-8	German
81	2013	Gnosticism		Cosmology and Fate in Gnosticism and Graeco-Roman Antiquity: Under Pitiless Skies	Nicola F. Denzey	ISBN 978-90-04-24548-8	
82	2013	Gnosticism	Festschrift	Gnosticism, Platonism and the Late Ancient World: Essays in Honour of John D. Turner	Kevin Corrigan, Tuomas Rasimus	ISBN 978-90-04-22383-7	
83	2013	Manichaeism	Conference proceedings	Augustine and Manichaean Christianity: Selected Papers from the First South African Conference on Augustine of Hippo, University of Pretoria, 24–26 April 2012	Johannes van Oort	ISBN 978-90-04-25477-0	
84	2013	Nag Hammadi	Collected papers	The Gospel of Thomas and Christian Origins: Essays on the Fifth Gospel	Stephen J. Patterson	ISBN 978-90-04-25084-0	
85	2013	Gnosticism	Festschrift	Practicing Gnosis: Ritual, Magic, Theurgy and Liturgy in Nag Hammadi, Manichaean and Other Ancient Literature. Essays in Honor of Birger A. Pearson	April DeConick, Gregory Shaw, John D. Turner	ISBN 978-90-04-25629-3	
86	2014	Nag Hammadi		The Nag Hammadi Story (2 vols.): From the Discovery to the Publication	James M. Robinson	ISBN 978-90-04-26251-5	
87	2014	Manichaeism		Mani at the Court of the Persian Kings: Studies on the Chester Beatty Kephalaia Codex	Iain Gardner, Jason D. BeDuhn, Paul Dilley	ISBN 978-90-04-23470-3	
88	2015	Manichaeism	Conference proceedings	Mani in Dublin: Selected Papers from the Seventh International Conference of the International Association of Manichaean Studies in the Chester Beatty Library, Dublin, 8–12 September 2009	Siegfried G. Richter, Charles Horton, Klaus Ohlhafer	ISBN 978-90-04-28836-2	
89	2015	Gnosticism		The Books of Jeu and the Pistis Sophia as Handbooks to Eternity: Exploring the Gnostic Mysteries of the Ineffable	Erin Evans	ISBN 978-90-04-28446-3	
90	2015	Manichaeism		Mani's Pictures: The Didactic Images of the Manichaeans from Sasanian Mesopotamia to Uygur Central Asia and Tang-Ming China	Zsuzsanna Gulácsi	ISBN 978-90-04-20912-1	
91	2015	Nag Hammadi		Linguistic Manifestations in the Trimorphic Protennoia and the Thunder: Perfect Mind: Analysed against the Background of Platonic and Stoic Dialectics	Tilde Bak Halvgaard	ISBN 978-90-04-30898-5	
92	2018	Manichaeism		The Chapters of the Wisdom of My Lord Mani: Part III: Pages 343-442 (Chapters 321-347)	Iain Gardner, Jason D. BeDuhn, Paul Dilley	ISBN 978-90-04-36336-6	
93	2018	Nag Hammadi		The Gospel of Thomas and Plato: A Study of the Impact of Platonism on the "Fifth Gospel"	Ivan Miroshnikov	ISBN 978-90-04-36728-9	
94	2018	Manichaeism		L'Hymnaire manichéen chinois Xiabuzan 下部讚 à l'usage des Auditeurs: Un manuscrit trouvé à Dunhuang, traduit, commenté et annoté	Lucie Rault	ISBN 978-90-04-36861-3	French
95	2019	Nag Hammadi		The Ethics of The Tripartite Tractate (NHC I, 5): A Study of Determinism and Early Christian Philosophy of Ethics	Paul Linjamaa	ISBN 978-90-04-40775-6	
96	2019	Gnosticism		Valentinianism: New Studies	Einar Thomassen, Christoph Markschies	ISBN 978-90-04-41371-9	
97	2020	Manichaeism		Mani and Augustine: Collected Essays on Mani, Manichaeism and Augustine	Johannes van Oort	ISBN 978-90-04-41695-6	
98	2020	Gnosticism		The Platonizing Sethian Background of Plotinus's Mysticism	Zeke Mazur	ISBN 978-90-04-44167-5	
99	2020	Manichaeism	Conference proceedings	Manichaeism and Early Christianity: Selected Papers from the 2019 Pretoria Congress and Consultation	Johannes van Oort	ISBN 978-90-04-44545-1	
100	2021	Manichaeism		The Manichaean Church in Kellis: Social Networks and Religious Identity in Late Antique Egypt	Håkon Fiane Teigen	ISBN 978-90-04-45976-2	
101	2022	Manichaeism	Conference proceedings	Women in Western and Eastern Manichaeism: Selected Papers from the International Conference Les femmes dans le manichéisme occidental et oriental held in Paris, University of Paris Sorbonne, 27–28 June 2014	Madeleine Scopello	ISBN 978-90-04-47221-1	
102	2022	Manichaeism		Religion and the Everyday Life of Manichaeans in Kellis: Beyond Light and Darkness	Mattias Brand	ISBN 978-90-04-50822-4	
103	2022	Nag Hammadi	Conference proceedings	The Dead Sea Scrolls and the Nag Hammadi Codices: Selected Papers from the Conference "The Dead Sea Scrolls and the Nag Hammadi Codices" in Berlin, 20–22 July 2018	Dylan M. Burns, Matthew J. Goff	ISBN 978-90-04-51302-0	
104	2023	Manichaeism	Conference proceedings	The Medinet Madi Library of Manichaean Codices at 90: Papers from the Symposium at the Chester Beatty Library in Dublin, 18–19 October 2019	Jason D. BeDuhn, Paul Dilley, Iain Gardner	ISBN 978-90-04-53982-2	
105	2023	Manichaeism		The Manichaeans of the Roman East: Manichaeism in Greek anti-Manichaica & Roman Imperial Legislation	Rea Matsangou	ISBN 978-90-04-54284-6	
106	2023	Gnosticism		Before Valentinus: The Gnostics of Irenaeus	Einar Thomassen	ISBN 978-90-04-67788-3	
107	2024	Nag Hammadi		The Monks of the Nag Hammadi Codices: Contextualising a Fourth-Century Monastic Community	Paula Tutty	ISBN 978-90-04-69574-0	
109	2027	Manichaeism		The West-Facing Manichaean Mission: Between Heresiology and Hagiography	Timothy Pettipiece	ISBN 978-90-04-77699-9	
