= NHMS =

NHMS may refer to:

- New Hampshire Motor Speedway in Loudon, New Hampshire
- Nathan Hale Middle School in Norwalk, Connecticut
- Nag Hammadi and Manichaean Studies, an academic book series published by Brill
