= As-Saaffat =

37th chapter of the Qur'an

Surah 37 of the Quran
الصافات Aṣ-Ṣāffāt Those Who Set the Ranks
- Qira'ah; English text
- Classification: Meccan
- Other names: Drawn Up in Ranks, The Arrangers, The Rangers
- Position: Juzʼ 23
- No. of verses: 182
- No. of Rukus: 5
- No. of words: 957
- No. of letters: 3825

As-Saffat (Arabic: الصافات, ’aṣ-ṣāffāt, meaning: Those who rank themselves in Order, "Ranged in Row", "The Rangers") is the 37th chapter (sūrah) of the Qur'an with 182 verses (āyāt).

Regarding the timing and contextual background of the believed revelation (asbāb al-nuzūl), it is an earlier "Meccan surah", which means it is believed to have been revealed in Mecca, rather than later in Medina.

== Summary ==
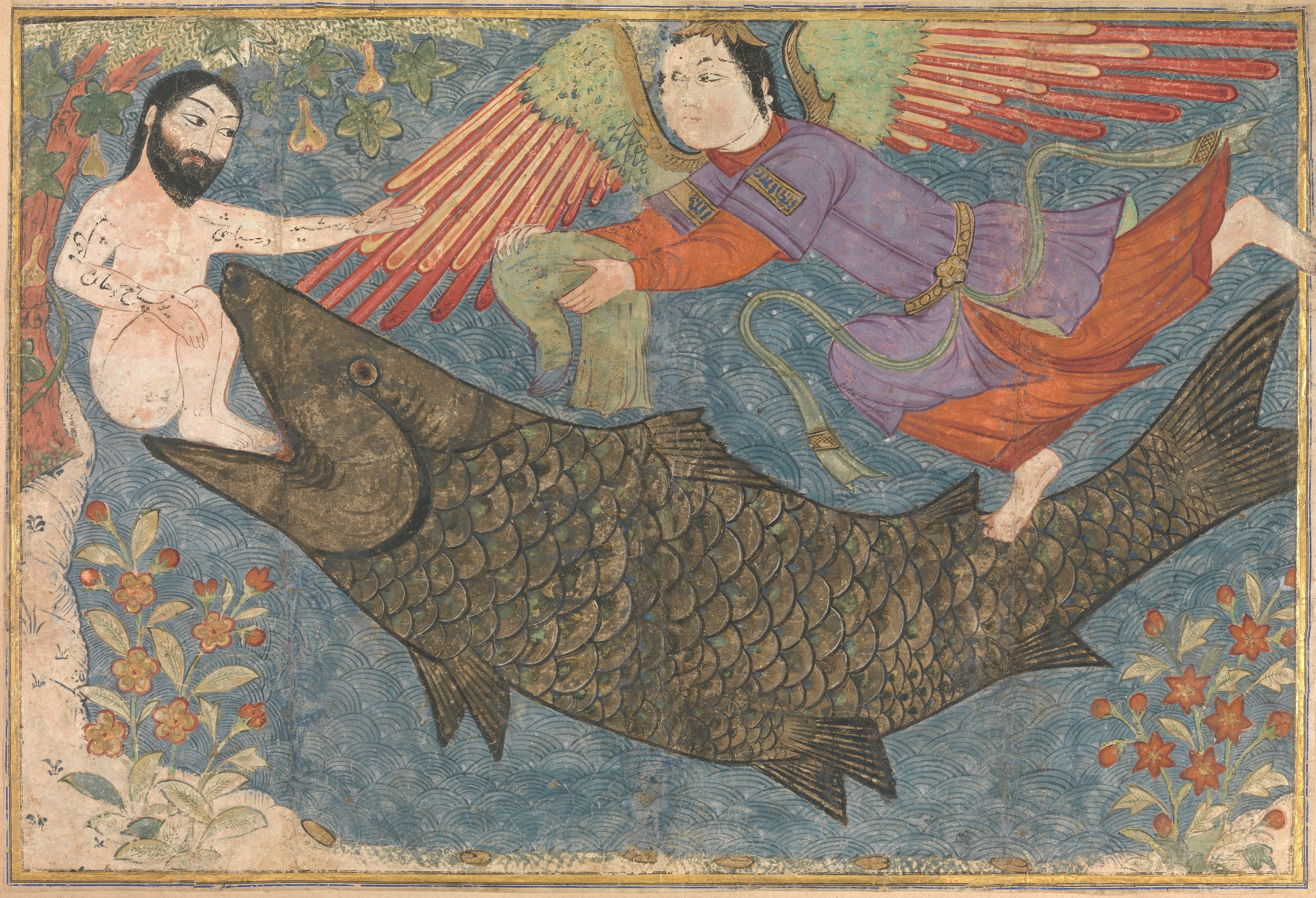
Jonas and the giant fish in the Jami' al-tawarikh

- 1-5 God swears that he is only one
- 6-10 The devils not permitted to hear the discourse of heaven
- 11-12 The audacity of the Makkan infidels
- 13-15 They scoff at the Quran as the product of sorcery
- 16-17 They reject the doctrine of the resurrection
- 18-21 The despair of the infidels on the Judgement Day
- 22-24 Idolaters and their idols and gods to be called to account
- 25-29 They will dispute among themselves and reproach one another
- 30-33 They shall all be punished in hell
- 34-35 Makkan idolaters call their Prophet “a distracted poet”
- 36-38 God protests his prophet's character and threatens the infidels
- 39-47 Reward of believers in Paradise
- 48-53 Believers shall look down from heaven upon their infidel acquaintance in hell
- 54-55 The righteous attribute their salvation to the grace of God
- 56-59 They rejoice in life eternal
- 60-62 The tree at Zaqqúm described
- 63-66 The awful portion of the damned
- 67-72 Meccan infidels follow in the footsteps of their fathers
- The story of Noah
  - 73 Noah calls on God in his distress
  - 74 He and his family are delivered
  - 75-79 His name to be revered by posterity
  - 80 The unbelievers are drowned
- The story of Abraham
  - 81, 82 Abraham a follower of Noah's religion
  - 83-85 He reproaches his father and neighbours for their idolatry
  - 86-88 He excuses himself from attending the idolatrous rites of his townsmen
  - 90-91 He first mocks the idols and then breaks them in pieces
  - 95-96 God delivers him from the fire
  - 97-107 God tries the faith of Abraham
  - 108-111 His name to be revered by posterity
  - 112-113 He receives Isaac by promise, who is blessed with him
- The story of Moses and Aaron
  - 114-115 God delivers them and their people from great distress
  - 116 They conquer the Egyptians
  - 117-118 God gives them the Book of the Law (Fourth)
  - 119-122 Their names to be revered by posterity
- The story of Elijah
  - 123 He is sent a prophet to his people
  - 124-126 He preaches against idolatry
  - 127 They accuse him of imposture
  - 128 The infidels to be punished
  - 129-132 His name to be revered by posterity
- The story of Lot
  - 133-135 God delivers him and his family, except his wife
  - 136 The rest of his people are destroyed
  - 137-138 The Meccan infidels warned by the example of the Sodomites
- The story of Jonah
  - 139-140 He is sent as a prophet and flees to a ship
  - 141-144 He is swallowed by a fish for his action
  - 145-146 He is cast on the shore and shaded by a gourd
  - 147-148 He is sent to a multitude who believe
- 149-160 The Meccans are rebuked for attributing offspring to God
- 161-163 The reprobate only will be seduced by idolatry
- 164-166 Muslims worship God, arranging themselves in ranks
- 167-170 Infidels excuse their unbelief in vain
- 171-173 Former apostles were assisted against the infidels
- 174-179 The Prophet exhorted to await divine vengeance on unbelievers
- 180-182 Praise be to God and peace on his apostles

== Chronology ==
According to Egyptian chronology, it was the 56th sura to be revealed to Muhammad. Theodor Nöldeke presents a different classification putting it in the 50th position and most precisely revealed in the second Meccan period (see Meccan sura). That period is marked by increasing opposition of the Quraysh tribe against Muhammad and his followers and is distinguished by its focus on divine intervention and inspiration and also previous religious prophets. Although named Al-Saffat, the general theme of Sura 37 is the unity of God and His power to greatly reward and punish. We see in this Sura elaborations on the punishment of disbelievers and rewards of believers in the Day of Judgment but also God's examples of how a true believer should be through enumerations of biblical figures. One aspect of the Sura which can be relevant to the title (Ranged in Row, the rangers) is that it is threatening the people who attribute offspring to God, especially the pagans who believed that the angels were the daughters of God. “The rangers” or “Ranged in Row” refers to the angel who will be lining up on the Day of Judgment and refuting the idea of them being daughters of God (see Quran 37:1-5).

Parts of Q37:15-33; 43–68; 82–103;& 118-144 are preserved in the Ṣan‘ā’1 lower text.

== Structure and content ==
Sura 37 could be divided into three parts following one characteristic of Arabic Poetry widely known as tripartite division. The first part goes from verses 1 to 74, the second part from 75 to 148 and the last part from 149 to 182.

=== 37:1-74 Eschatological prophecy ===
The first part goes from verse 1 to 74 with eschatological prophecy as central theme but could be divided into two sub-parts: 1-10 and 11–74.

From verse 1 to 10, we have a snapshot of the setting of the Day of Judgment. From this description, you see that there will be angels ranged in row claiming the unity of God (37:1-6), a higher assembly quite exclusive (37:7-8) and disbelievers who will be driven away for their perpetual torment (37:9-10). This same setting is consistent with the one described in Sura 78:38 in the early Meccan period: “On the day when the spirit and the angels stand in rows, they will not speak except for those to whom the Lord of Mercy gives permission, and who will say only what is right”. However comparing this two verses, we see that the last one (37:1-6) has more details than the previous one (78:38). It almost seems that the latter is a continuation of the former. We can infer, from the combination of the two verses, that the angels ranged in row will vehemently refute what the pagans were putting forward about them (the angels) being the daughters of God (see Arabian mythology) and will claim the unity of God under his permission.

From 11 to 74, the verses reveal the description of the Day of Judgment including a depiction of its dynamic in its smallest details. At the beginning of this sub-part (11 to 39), we are exposed to a debate between the Prophet and the angels on one side, and the disbelievers on the other side. Debates are mainly characteristics of middle Meccan suras. In this particular section, one could sense a two-way discussion between both parties, putting more stress on the feelings of one party: the disbelievers. This section starts with how the disbelievers use to refute the message of God and continue with how their attitude will change when they will be faced with the truth of the Day of Judgment. The Sura portrays their surprise, their regrets for not believing in the word of God and makes it seem that it will be too late for them to be saved because in the Day of Judgment, no one would be able to return to the world and change their ways (Since they had already been given a lot of time to do so before that Day). In addition, this section puts the Prophet in an intermediate position where he is made to transmit God's answers to them on that specific day: “Say, yes indeed, and you will be humiliated” (37:18). Finally, throughout verses 11 to 74 we see an interesting juxtaposition structure which is very visible. The attitudes and experiences of people whose actions were good on earth and those whose actions were bad are explored back to back to make the contrast more visible but also to provide a picture of the scenery in the Day of Judgment with the two sides sitting not far away from each other. From verse 11 to 39, we have a description of the experience of the disbelievers on the D-day and follows, from verse 40 to 57, a contrasting experience of the believers where they comment on the fate of the disbelievers and how lucky they were not to be in their place: “By God, you almost brought me to ruin! Had it not been for the grace of my Lord, I too would have been taken to hell” (37:56). Finally we see again from verses 58 to 74 another description of the disbelievers’ experience. One specific detail that will be interesting to look at in this last part is the mention of a specific tree in verses 62 to 69: the tree of Zaqqum whose fruits will be forced to people in hell to intensify their torment. In Asbab al-nuzul, this tree is believed to be used to threaten the unbelievers among the Quraysh tribe.

=== 37:75-148 Earlier messengers of God ===
In the early Meccan suras, there was not any mention of the earlier messengers of God as present in the Bible but in the middle Meccan suras they are gradually brought in to translate their actions into great rewards in the Afterlife and therefore give good references to the common believers and unbelievers. This section particularly tackles some biblical figures with a snapshot of specific actions they took that translated into great rewards. It starts with Noah with a snapshot of the Noah's Ark story in the Bible, putting a stress on how God helped him to save his people because he was a true believer. We also have a mention of the story of Jonah, Yunus, describing his fall in the ocean and how God saved him by making him be swallowed by a big fish. We therefore see a slightly different approach of the Quran from the Bible based on where the emphasis is put on in counting that story. We also see snapshots of stories about Abraham, Moses, Aaron, Elijah and Lot included in this section to serve the same purpose: stressing out God's rewards to his true servants (37:121) instead of limiting oneself in counting these stories as they occurred, as the Bible does.

=== 149-182 Day of Judgment ===
In this last section, we are taken back into the Day of Judgment where the Quran is addressing the disbelievers one more time but differently. Here it is no longer a debate but one way speech. We see a succession of rhetorical question about certain claims the disbelievers are making that God, through Muhammad, is asking. He then develops into saying that those claims are all false and the disbelievers will know when the Day of Judgment comes. This section closes with a few praises to God making a ring structure which is very noticeable. Indeed, as mentioned in the beginning, the angels were ranged in row praising God and we see here from 164 to 166 the same scenario and then from 180 to 182 we read again praises to God. The Sura therefore goes from one point and comes back to the same point at the end, making a ring.
