= Wolf-Peter Funk =

German-Canadian professor (1943–2021)

- Born: 1943; Oederan, Germany
- Died: February 18, 2021 (aged 77–78); Quebec City, Canada
- Occupation: Professor

Academic background
- Doctoral advisor: Hans-Martin Schenke

Academic work
- Discipline: Coptology
- Institutions: Université Laval
- Main interests: Gnosticism, Manichaeism, Coptology

Wolf-Peter Funk (born 1943 in Oederan, Germany; died February 18, 2021, in Quebec City, Canada) was a German linguist and Coptologist known for his pioneering studies on Gnosticism, Manichaeism, and Coptic manuscripts such as the Nag Hammadi library.

== Biography ==
Wolf-Peter Funk was born in 1943 in Oederan, Germany as the only son of Johanna Roeber and Wolfgang Funk.

As a student of Hans-Martin Schenke, Wolf-Peter Funk was one of the founders of the Berlin Working Group for Coptic Gnostic Writings. As part of the research group in Berlin, he translated many texts in the Nag Hammadi library during the 1970s.

In 1986, Funk became a visiting professor in the Faculty of Theology and Religious Studies at Laval University, specializing in Coptic linguistics and biblical and Gnostic literature. At Laval, he worked on the "Bibliothèque copte de Nag Hammadi" (Nag Hammadi Coptic Library) Project, and was later appointed associate professor at Laval. He has worked on digital concordances of the Nag Hammadi texts, which were originally stored on floppy disks.

Wolf-Peter Funk has worked on the reconstruction and translation of the Manichaean Coptic manuscripts held at the National Museum of Berlin. He taught Coptic at Laval University until 2009. He has also worked on concordances of the Manichaean Kephalaia and the Manichaean Homilies.

He died from cancer at the Hôpital de l'Enfant-Jésus in Quebec City on February 18, 2021, at the age of 77.

== Works (selected) ==
Selected works (books authored or with contributed articles):

- Funk, Wolf-Peter (2000). Marsanés (NH X) (in French). Québec Louvain: Presses De L'Université Laval Editions Peeters. ISBN 978-90-429-0855-0. OCLC 46919357.
- Funk, Wolf-Peter (2010). L'Interprétation de la gnose : NH XI, 1 (in French). Leuven Walpole, MA Québec: Peeters Presses de l'Université Laval. ISBN 978-90-429-2190-0. OCLC 556946951.
- Funk, Wolf-Peter (2018). Manichaische Handschriften: Kephalaia I, Supplementa. Kohlhammer Verlag. ISBN 978-3-17-035479-1. OCLC 1049911160.
- Painchaud, Louis (1995). L'écrit sans titre : traité sur l'origine du monde (NH II,5 et XIII,2 et Brit. Lib. Or. 4926[1) (in French). Québec Louvain: Presses de l'Université Laval Peeters. ISBN 978-90-6831-702-2. OCLC 50738408.
- Barry, Catherine (2000). Zostrien (NH VIII, 1) (in French). Québec, Canada Louvain Paris: Presses de l'Université Laval Peeters. ISBN 978-90-429-0730-0. OCLC 44973878.
- Brashear, William (1990). The Chester Beatty codex AC 1390: mathematical school exercises in Greek and John 10:7-13:38 in Subachmimic. Leuven, Belgium: Peeters. ISBN 978-90-6831-340-6. OCLC 27398984.
- Gardner, Iain (1999). Coptic documentary texts from Kellis. Oxford: Oxbow Books. ISBN 978-1-900188-98-2. OCLC 51681361.

== Translations and concordances ==
French translations and concordances published by Laval University Press:

- Exposé du mythe valentinien et textes liturgiques (NH XI, 2 + 2A-C) (BCNH "Textes" no 36)
- Le livre des secrets de Jean. Recension brève (NH III, 1 ET BG, 2) (BCNH "Textes" no 35)
- L'interprétation de la Gnose (NH XI, 1) (BCNH "Textes" no 34)
- Allogène (NH X1, 3) (BCNH "Textes" no 30)
- Les Concordances des textes de Nag Hammadi, Les Codices XIb, XII, XIII
- Marsanès (NH X) (BCNH "Textes" no 27)
- Melchisédek (NHIX, 1) (BCNH "Textes" no 28)
- Zostrien (NH VIII. 1) (BCNH "Textes" no 24)
- Concordance des textes de Nag Hammadi, Codices X et XIA
- Concordance des textes de Nag Hammadi, Les Codices VIII et IX
