= Elijah in Islam =

Prophet in Islam

Prophet Ilyas Alayhi as-Salam
- إلياس; Elijah
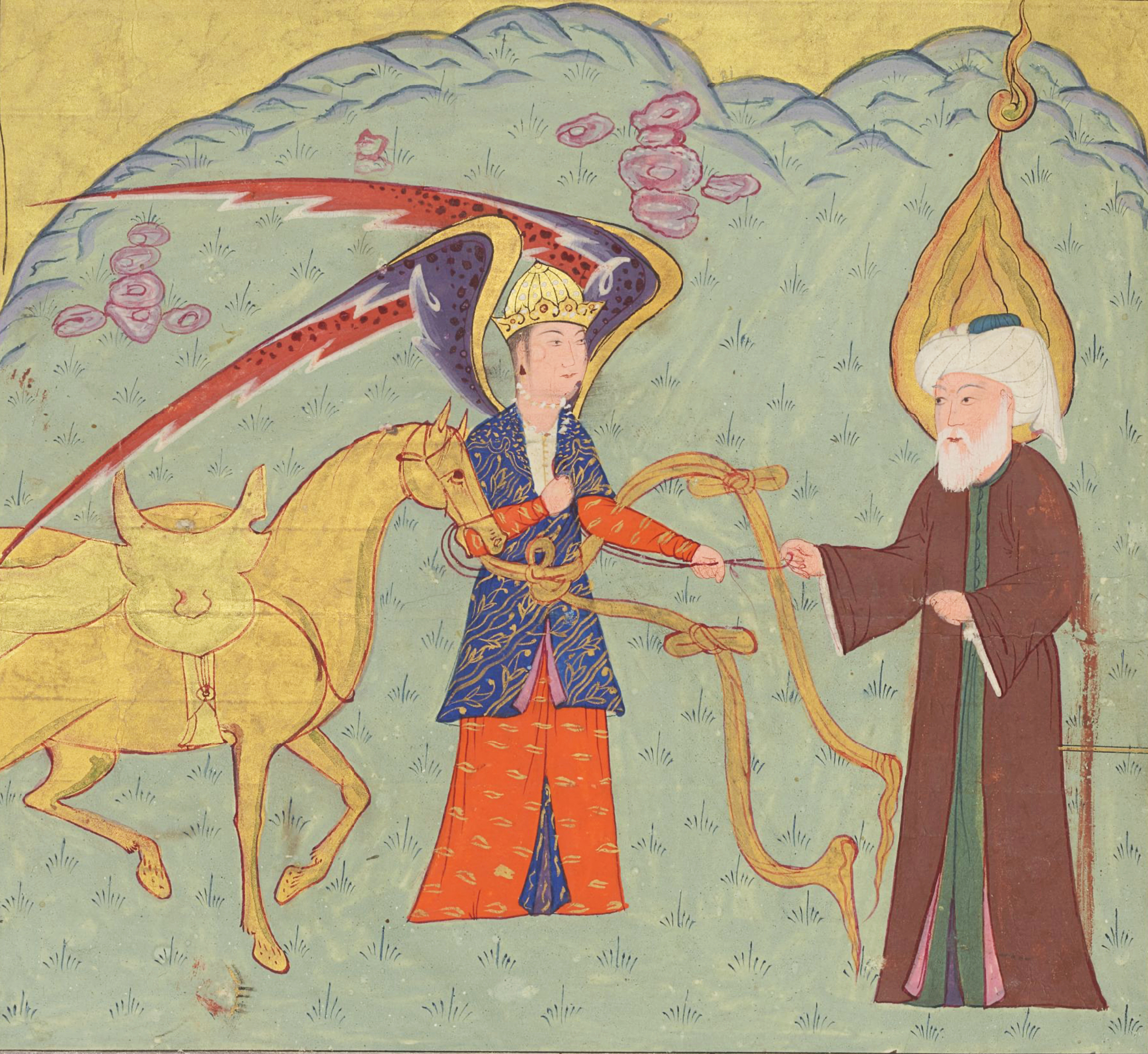
- Ilyas being given a horse of fire by an angel, to ascend to heaven.

Prophet of Islam
- Preceded by: Suleyman
- Succeeded by: Alyasa

Personal life
- Born: Ilyas Ibn Yasin; Unknown Northern Kingdom of Israel
- Died: c. 850/849 BCE Northern Kingdom of Israel
- Parent: Yasin (father)
- Region: Ash-Sham
- Relatives: Harun (forefather)

Religious life
- Religion: Islam

Muslim leader
- Influenced: Alyasa

Ilyās (Arabic: إلياس) in Islam was a prophet of God who was sent to guide the Israelites. He was given the prophetic mission to prevent people from worshipping idols. Ilyas is the prophetic predecessor to Alyasa. Some Islamic scholars believe, that Ilyas is from the progeny of Harun (Aaron).

== Early life ==
In Islamic sources, Ilyas' full name is Ilyas ibn Yasin.

According to many Islamic sources and the Bible, Ilyas ascended to the heavens. However, Ibn Kathir did not accept these hadiths and considered them among Isra'iliyat. In Mu'jam al-buldan, Yaqut al-Hamawi mentioned a grave for Ilyas in Baalbek. A shrine was later built over this grave, but it was dedicated to a "Prophet Aila" even though locals believed it was the tomb of Elias.

== Prophethood ==
Ilyas is first mentioned as a prophet in Al-An'am 6:85. He invited his people who lived in Baalbek to monotheism, obeying Allah and abandoning sins. His main task was to prevent the idol-worshipping. After he faced persistence of his people for many years, cursed them with drought and people were inflicted with starvation. Ilyas' narrative in the Quran and later Muslim tradition resembles closely that in the Hebrew Bible and Muslim literature records Elijah's primary prophesying as taking place during the reign of Ahab and Jezebel as well as Ahaziah. (Note: "Elias is the same as Elijah, whose story will be found in the Old Testament in 1 Kings 17–19 and 2 Kings 1–2. Elijah lived in the reign of Ahab (896–874 BCE) and Ahaziah (874–872 BCE), kings of the (northern) kingdom of Israel or Samaria. He was a prophet of the desert, like John the Baptist. Both Ahab and Azariah were prone to lapse into the worship of Baal, the sun-god worshipped in Syria. That worship also included the worship of nature-powers and procreative powers, as in the Hindu worship of the Lingam, and led to many abuses. King Ahab had married a princess of Sidon, Jezebel, a wicked woman who led her husband to forsake Allah and adopt Baal-worship. ... Elijah denounced all Ahab's sins as well as the sins of Ahaziah and had to flee for his life. Eventually, according to the Old Testament,(4 Kings, 2:11) he was taken up in a whirlwind to heaven in a chariot of fire after he had left his mantle with Elisha the prophet.") Ilyas' figure has been identified with a number of other prophets and saints, including Idris, which is believed by some scholars to have been another name for Ilyas, and Khidr. Islamic legend later developed the figure of Ilyas, greatly embellishing upon his attributes, and some apocryphal literature gave Ilyas the status of a half-human, half-angel. Ilyas also appears in later works of literature, including the Hamzanama.

=== Quran ===
Elijah is mentioned in the Quran, where his preaching is recounted in a concise manner. The Quran narrates that Elijah told his people to come to the worship of Allah and to leave the worship of Baal, the primary idol of the area. The Quran states:

"Verily Elijah was one of the apostles. When he said to his people: "Will you not fear Allah? "Will ye call upon Ba'al and leave the Best of Creators, Allah, your Lord and Cherisher and the Lord and Cherisher of your fathers of old?

— As-Saaffat 123–126

The Quran makes it clear that the majority of Elijah's people denied the prophet and continued to follow idolatry. However, it mentions that a small number of devoted servants of God among them followed Elijah and believed in and worshiped Allah. The Quran states, "They denied him (Elijah), and will surely be brought to punishment, Except the sincere and devoted Servants of Allah (among them). And We left his (memory) for posterity."

In the Quran, Allah praises Elijah in two places:

Peace be upon Elijah! This is how We reward those who do good. He is truly among our believing servants.

— Quran, chapter 37 (As-Saaffat), verse 129–132

And Zakariya and Yahya and Isa and Elijah, they were all from among the righteous

— Quran, chapter 6 (Al-An'am), verse 85

Numerous commentators, including Abdullah Yusuf Ali, have offered commentary on verse 85 saying that Elijah, Zakariya, Yahya and Isa were all spiritually connected. Abdullah Yusuf Ali says, "The third group consists not of men of action, but Preachers of Truth, who led solitary lives. Their epithet is: "the Righteous." They form a connected group round Jesus. Zachariah was the father of John the Baptist, who is referenced as "Elijah, which was for to come" (Matt 11:14); and Elias is said to have been present and talked to Jesus at the Transfiguration on the Mount (Matt. 17:3)."

Although most Muslim scholars believed that Elijah preached in Israel, some early commentators on the Quran stated that Ilyas was sent to Baalbek, in Lebanon. Modern scholars have rejected this claim, stating that the connection of the city with Elijah would have been made because of the first half of the city's name, that of Baal, which was the deity that Elijah exhorted his people to stop worshiping. Scholars who reject identification of Elijah's town with Baalbek further argue that the town of Baalbek is not mentioned with the narrative of Elijah in either the Quran or the Hebrew Bible.

== Death ==
By the passage of time, drought spread and many died. When they saw themselves inflicted, regretted their past deeds, turned to Elyas, and accepted his invitation. Then, due to the Dua of Ilias a heavy rain came and the land was satiated; however, after a while, people forgot their covenant with Allah and returned to idol worshipping. When Ilias saw this, he asked God for his own death; but, Allah sent him a chariot of fire and he ascended to the skies and chose Alyasa who was his pupil as his vicegerent. Ilyas is rarely associated with Islamic eschatology. However, some Muslims believe that Ilyas is expected to come back along with the mysterious figure Khidr during the end of times.

== Legacy ==
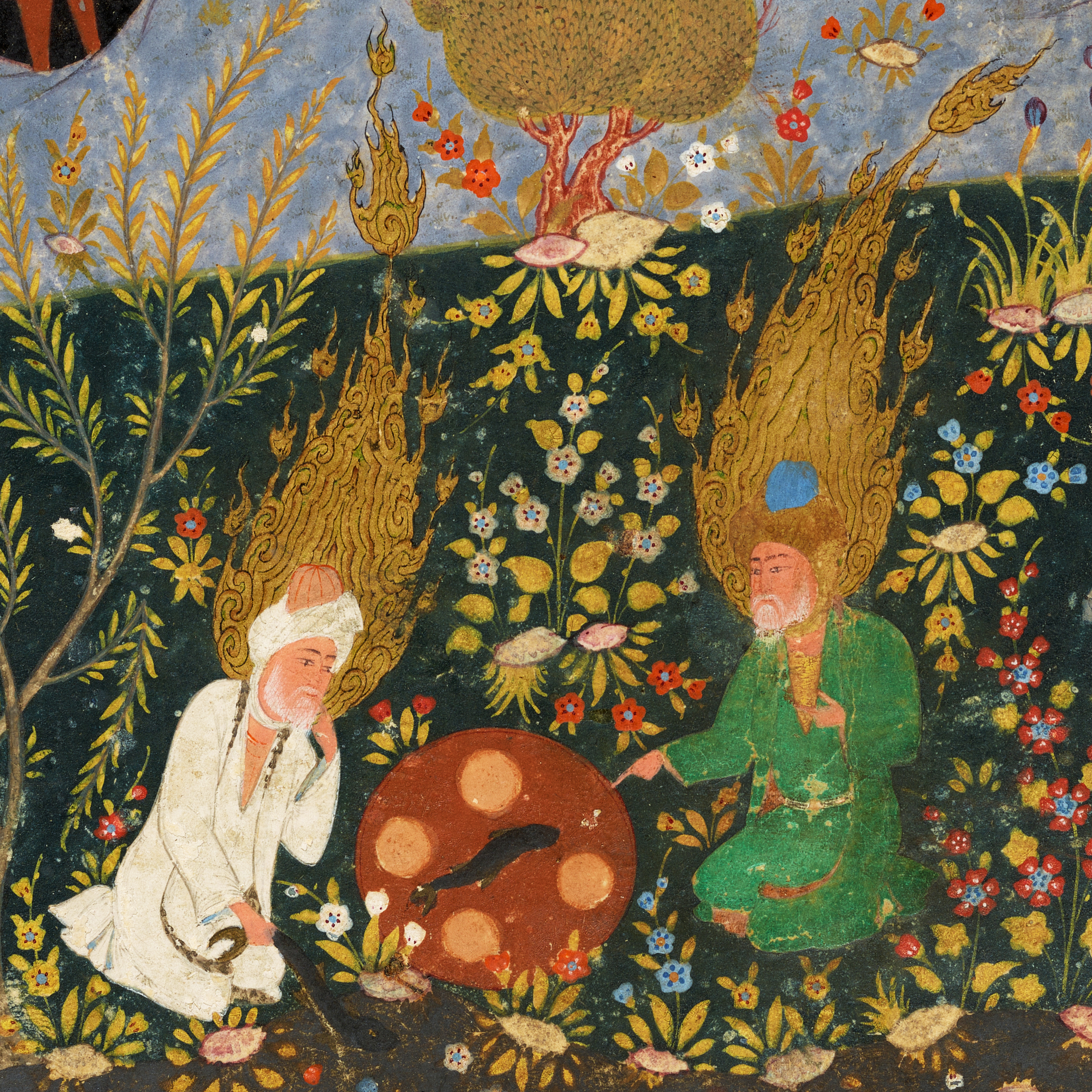
Ilyas (left) and fellow Islamic prophet Khidr sit together at the fountain of youth.

Muslim literature and tradition recounts that Ilyas preached to the Kingdom of Israel, ruled over by Ahab and later his son Ahaziah. He is called a "prophet of the desert—like Yahya". Ilyas is believed to have preached with zeal to Ahab and his wife Jezebel, who according to Muslim tradition was partly responsible for the worship of false idols in this area. Muslims believe that it was because the majority of people refused to listen to Elijah that Elisha had to continue preaching the message of Allah to Israel after him.

Ilyas has been the subject of legends and folktales in Muslim culture, usually involving his meeting with Khidr. According to a Muslim exegete report, Muhammad met Ilyas in Makkah. In Islamic mysticism, Ilyas is associated closely with the sage Khidr. One hadith reported that Ilyas and Khidr met together every year in Jerusalem to go on the pilgrimage to Makkah. Ilyas appears also in the Hamzanama numerous times, where he is spoken of as being the brother of Khidr as well as one who drank from the Fountain of Youth. Further, It is narrated in Kitab al-Kafi that Imam Ja'far al-Sadiq was reciting the prostration of Ilyas in the Syrian language and began to weep. He then translated the supplication in Arabic to a group of visiting scholars:

"O Lord, will I find that you punish me although you know of my thirst in the heat of midday? Will I find that you punish me although you know that I rub my face on Earth to worship you? Will I find that you punish me although you know that I give up sins for you? Will I find that you punish me although you know that I stay awake all night just for you?" To which Allah then inspired to Ilyas, "Raise your head from the Earth for I will not punish you".
