= Prophets and messengers in Islam =

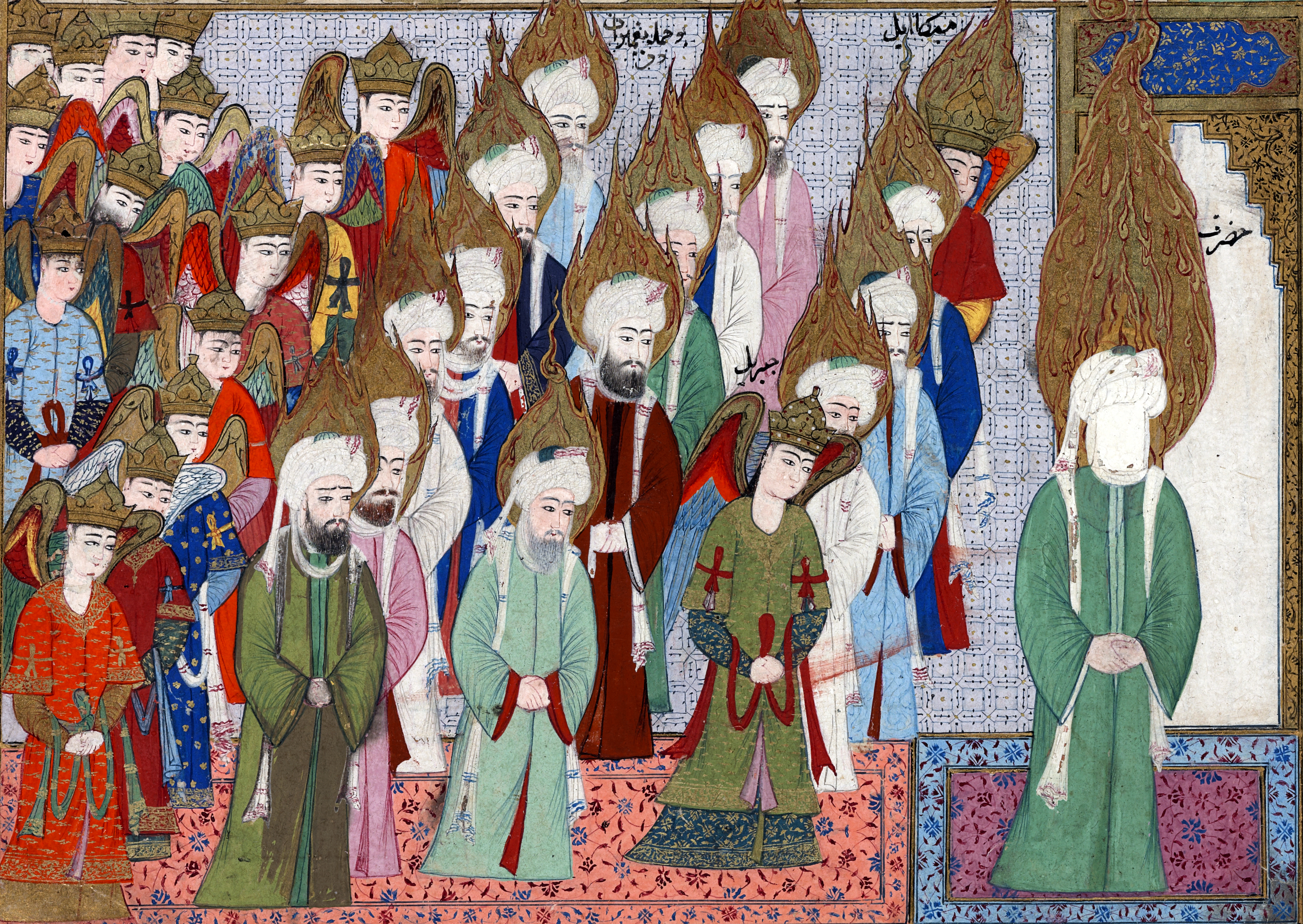
Islamic miniature depicting Muhammad leading a prayer of all Islamic prophets and messengers in a celestial Mosque during Isra' and Mi'raj

Prophets in Islam (Arabic: ٱلْأَنْبِيَاء فِي ٱلْإِسْلَام, romanized: al-anbiyāʾ fī al-islām) are individuals in Islam who are believed to spread God's message on Earth and serve as models of ideal human behaviour. Some prophets are categorized as messengers (Arabic: رُسُل, romanized: rusul. Sing. رَسُول, rasūl), those who transmit divine revelation, most of them through the interaction of an angel. Muslims believe that many prophets existed, including many not mentioned in the Quran. The Quran states: "And for every community there is a messenger." Belief in the Islamic prophets is one of the six articles of the Islamic faith.

Muslims believe that the first prophet was also the first human being Adam, created by God. Many of the revelations delivered by the 48 prophets in Judaism and many prophets of Christianity are mentioned as such in the Quran with the Arabic versions of their names; for example, the Jewish Elisha is called Alyasaʿ, Job is Ayyub, Jesus is 'Isa, etc. The Torah given to Moses (Musa) is called Tawrat, the Psalms given to David (Dawud) is the Zabur, the Gospel given to Jesus is Injil.

The last prophet in Islam is Muhammad, whom Muslims believe to be the Seal of the Prophets, to whom the Quran was revealed in a series of revelations (and written down by his companions). Muslims believe the Quran is the divine word of God, thus immutable and protected from distortion and corruption, destined to remain in its true form until the Last Day. Although Muhammad is considered the last prophet, some Muslim traditions also recognize and venerate saints. In Islam, every prophet preached the same core beliefs: the Oneness of God, worshipping of that one God, avoidance of idolatry and sin, and the belief in the Day of Resurrection or the Day of Judgement and life after death. Prophets and messengers are believed to have been sent by God to different communities during different times in history.

== Terminology ==
=== Pre-Quranic ===
The Syriac form of rasūl Allāh (lit. 'messenger of God'), s̲h̲eliḥeh d-allāhā, occurs frequently in the apocryphal Acts of St. Thomas. The corresponding verb for s̲h̲eliḥeh—s̲h̲alaḥ, occurs in connection with the prophets in the Hebrew Bible.

=== Terminology in the Quran ===
In Arabic, the term nabī (Arabic plural form: أنبياء, anbiyāʼ) means "prophet". Forms of this noun occur 75 times in the Quran. The term nubuwwah (Arabic: نبوة "prophethood") occurs five times in the Quran. The terms rasūl (Arabic plural: رسل, rusul) and mursal (Arabic: مرسل, mursal, pl: مرسلون, mursalūn) denote "messenger with law given by/received from God" and occur more than 300 times. The term for a prophetic "message" (Arabic: رسالة, risālah, pl: رسالات, risālāt) appears in the Quran in ten instances.

The following table shows these words in different languages:

Prophet and Messenger in the Bible and Quran
| Arabic | English | Greek | Hebrew |
|---|---|---|---|
| نَبِيّ nabī, pronounced [ˈnæbiː] | prophet | προφήτης prophētēs | נָבִיא (nāḇî') pronounced [naˈvi] |
| رَسُول rasūl, pronounced [rɑˈsuːl] مُرْسَل mursal, pronounced [ˈmʊrsæl] | messenger prophet apostle | ἄγγελος, angelos ἀπόστολος, apostolos | מַלְאָךְ mal'āḵ, pronounced [malˈ(ʔ)aχ] שְׁלַח, šᵊlaḥ pronounced [ʃeˈlaχ]}} |

=== Usage of Angels ===
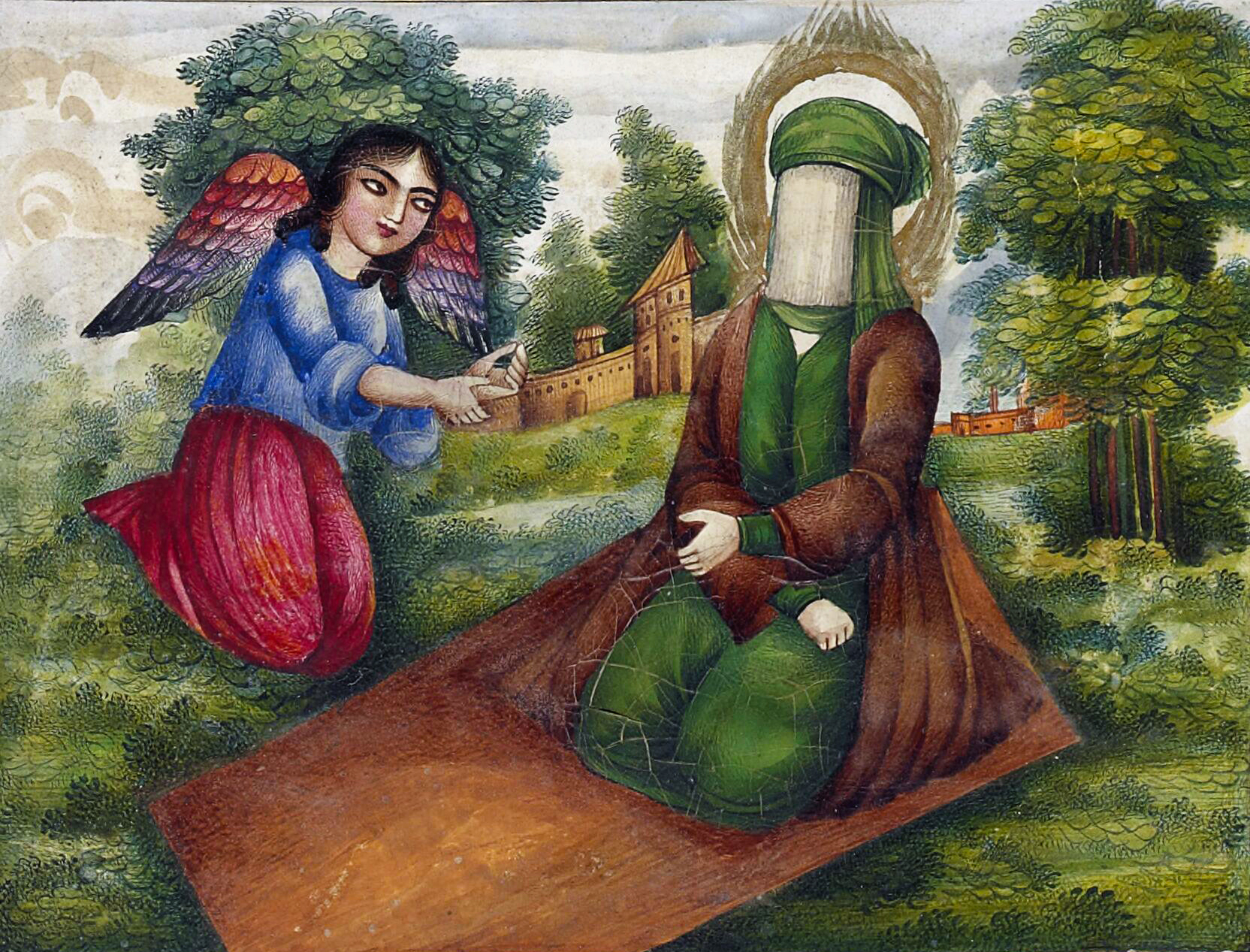
Islamic miniature depicting Jibril providing prophetic revelation from God to Muhammad

Exegetes usually distinguish the messenger angels (rasūl), who carry out divine decrees between heaven and earth, from the angels in heaven (karubiyin). In the Quran and tafsir, the term rasūl is also used for messengers from among the angels. The term is used in Quran 81:19, Quran 11:69–11, and Quran 51:26–11, and is also used for the servants of the Angel of Death.

== Characteristics ==
In Islam, the Quran is believed to be a revelation from the last prophet in the Abrahamic succession, Muhammad, and its contents detail what Muslims refer to as the straight path. According to Islamic belief, every prophet preached submission and obedience to God (Islam). There is an emphasis on charity, prayer, pilgrimage, fasting, with the most emphasis given to the strict belief and worship of a singular God. The Quran itself calls Islam the "religion of Abraham" (Ibrahim) and refers to Jacob (Yaqub) and the Twelve Tribes of Israel as being Muslims.

The Quran says:

He has ordained for you ˹believers˺ the Way which He decreed for Noah, and what We have revealed to you ˹O Prophet˺ and what We decreed for Abraham, Moses, and Jesus, ˹commanding:˺ "Uphold the faith, and make no divisions in it."

— Surah Ash-Shura 42:13

Prophets in Islam are exemplars to ordinary humans. They exhibit model characteristics of righteousness and moral conduct. Prophetic typologies shared by all prophets include prophetic lineage, advocating monotheism, transmitting God's messages, and warning of the eschatological consequences of rejecting God. Prophetic revelation often comes in the form of signs and divine proofs. Each prophet is connected to one another, and ultimately supports the final prophetic message of Muhammad. The qualities prophets possess are meant to lead people towards the straight path. In one hadith, it was stated: "Among men the prophets suffer most."

=== Signs and divine proofs ===
Throughout the Quran, prophets such as Moses and Jesus often perform miracles or are associated with miraculous events. The Quran makes clear that these events always occur through God and not of the prophet's own volition. Throughout the Meccan passages there are instances where the Meccan people demand visual proofs of Muhammad's divine connection to God to which Muhammad replies "The signs are only with Allah, and I am only a plain warner." (Q29:50) According to Muslims, this instance makes clear that prophets are only mortals who can testify to God's omnipotence and produce signs when he wills it. Furthermore, the Quran states that visual and verbal proofs are often rejected by the unbelievers as being sihr ("magic") The Quran reads: "They claim that he tries to bewitch them and make them believe that he speaks the word of God, although he is just an ordinary human being like themselves. (Q74:24-25)

=== Sin and protection ===
In the early years of Islam, prophets were not considered infallible or sinless. Every greater prophet, with exception to Jesus, was accused of sin. Not only was it possible for prophets to sin, their sins had soteriological significance. For example, Moses in Islam needs forgiveness after he killed an innocent person. Adam regretted his sin in Garden Eden, which is supposed to teach humans how to repent.

By the ninth century CE, Sunni Islam began to consider prophets to be sinless. It became a major concern to ensure the reliability of the revelation. This doctrine probably developed under influence of Shia Islam from the doctrine of the infallible Shia Imams (ʿiṣmah). Later Mutazilites agree to this view and hold that prophets are protected from both minor sins and major sins. From among the Asharites it has been argued that prophets are protected from sinning in their function as a messenger. Al-Baqillani stated that prophets are mainly protected from deception and lying when they convey God's message and from major sins, but are not generally sinless. The majority of theologians subscribed to this opinion.

Later, especially Muhammad is described as infallible among Sufis. When asked how Muhammad was not affected by the touch of the devil, Rumi compares devils to a dog's saliva poured into an ocean, the ocean symbolizing Muhammad's greatness. Other people, on the other hand, are like a cup filled with water. The dog cannot affect the ocean, but the dog's saliva affects the cup of water.

=== Wisdom ===
Muhammad was given a divine gift of revelation through the angel Gabriel. This direct communication with the divine underlines the human experience but the message of the Quran dignifies this history of revelation with these select people in human history the foundation for Muhammed's prophetic lineage.

The Quran mentions various divinely-bestowed gifts given to various prophets. These may be interpreted as books or forms of celestial knowledge. Although all prophets are believed by Muslims to have been immensely gifted, special mention of "wisdom" or "knowledge" for a particular prophet is understood to mean that some secret knowledge was revealed to him. The Quran mentions that Abraham prayed for wisdom and later received it. It also mentions that Joseph and Moses both attained wisdom when they reached full age; David received wisdom with kingship, after slaying Goliath; Lot (Lut) received wisdom whilst prophesying in Sodom and Gomorrah; John the Baptist received wisdom while still a mere youth; and Jesus received wisdom and was vouchsafed the Gospel.

=== Prophetic lineage ===
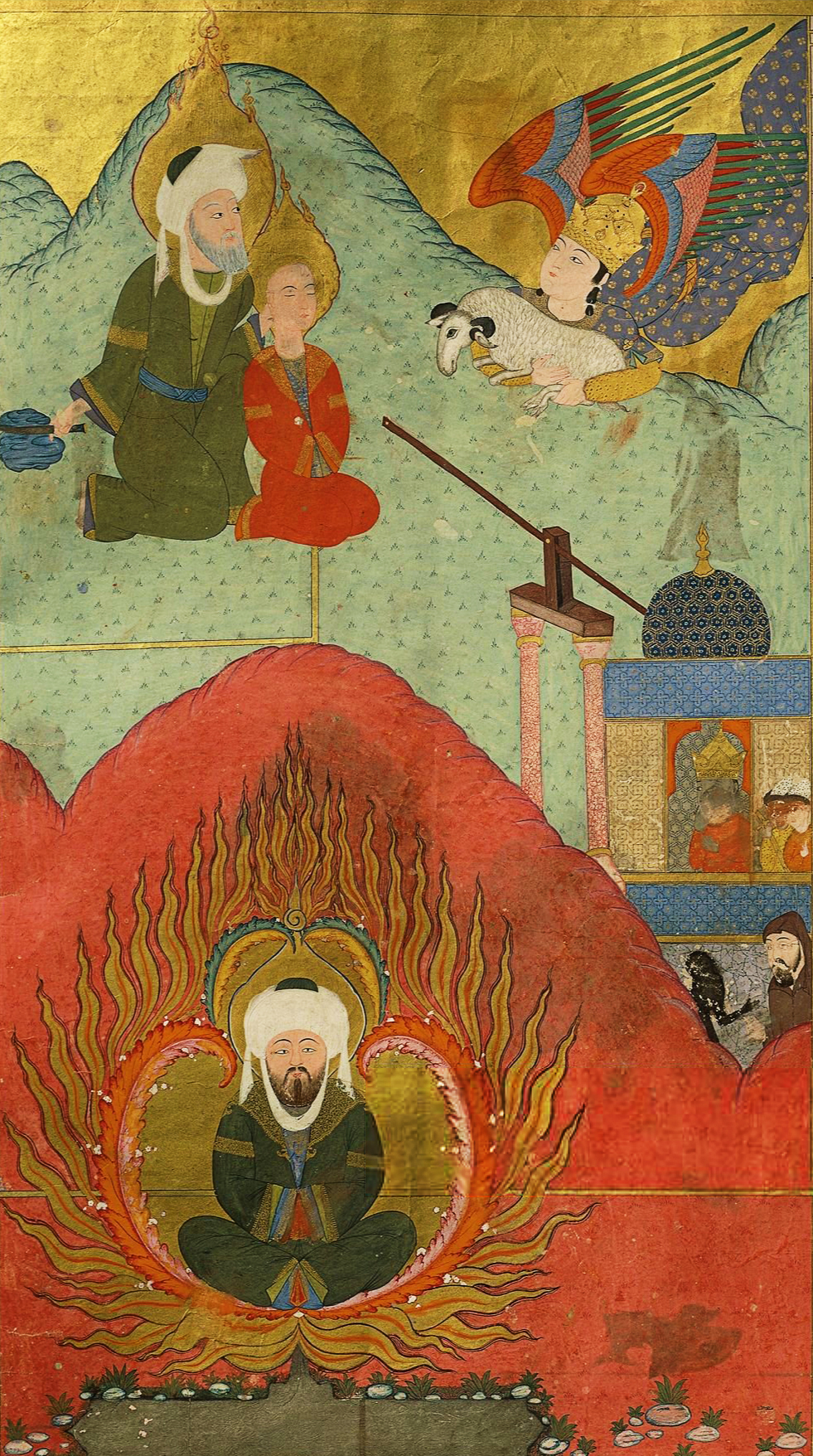
Abraham sacrificing his son, Ishmael; and Abraham cast into fire by Nimrod. A miniature in the 16th-century Ottoman Turkish manuscript Zubdat Al-Tawarikh

Abraham is widely recognized for being the father of monotheism in the Abrahamic religions. In the Quran, he is recognized as a messenger, a spiritual examplar to mankind, Quran 2:24 and a link in the chain of Muslim prophets. Muhammad, God's final messenger and the revelator of the Quran, is a descendant of Abraham, and Muhammad completes Abraham's prophetic lineage. This relationship can be seen in the Quranic chapter 6:

That is Our Argument which We imparted to Abraham against his people. We raise up in degrees whomever We please. Your Lord is indeed Wise, All-Knowing. And We granted him Isaac and Jacob, and guided each of them; and Noah We guided before that, and of his progeny, [We guided] David, Solomon, Job, Joseph, Moses and Aaron. Thus We reward the beneficent. And Zechariah, John, Jesus and Elias, each was one of the righteous. And Ishmael, Elijah, Jonah and Lot; each We exalted above the whole world. [We also exalted some] of their fathers, progeny and brethren. And We chose them and guided them to a straight path.6:83-87

The Quran presents the world as full of interlocking dramas and conflicts. The divine drama concerns the events of creation and banishment from the garden; while the human drama concerns the life and history of humanity but, also includes the events in the life of the prophets. Islamic morality is founded on this virtuous living through faith in the life ordained by the divine. This is the divine task given to believers accompanied by the divine gift that the Prophets had in revelation and perspective of ayat. The prophets are called to follow and reclaim the message of the straight path. This is the key feature of the authority of their revelation, which fits within the Abrahamic tradition. The Quran's place within the broader Abrahamic context gives the revelation to Muhammed the same authority as the Tawrat and the Injil.

==== Representation and prophetic connection to Muhammad ====
There are patterns of representation of Quranic prophecy that support the revelation of Muhammad. Since Muhammad is in Abraham's prophetic lineage, they are analogous in many aspects of their prophecy. Muhammad was trying to rid the Pagans of idolatry during his lifetime, which is similar to Abraham. This caused many to reject Muhammad’s message and even made him flee from Mecca due to his unsafety in the city. Carl Ernest, the author of How to Read the Qur’an: A New Guide, with Select Translations, states, "The Qur’an frequently consoles Muhammad and defends him against his opponents." This consolation can also be seen as parallel to Abraham's encouragement from God. Muhammad is also known to perform miracles as Abraham did. Sura 17 (al-isrā) briefly describes Muhammad's miraculous Night Journey where he physically ascended to the Heavens to meet with previous prophets. This spiritual journey is significant in the sense that many Islamic religious traditions and transformations were given and established during this miracle, such as the ritual of daily prayer. (Q17:78-84) Muhammad is a descendant of Abraham; therefore, this not only makes him part of the prophetic lineage, but the final prophet in the Abrahamic lineage to guide humanity to the Straight Path. In Sura 33 (al-ahzāb) it confirms Muhammad and states, "Muhammad is not the father of any of your men, but is the Messenger of Allah and the seal of the Prophets. Allah is Cognizant of everything". (Q33:40)

== Known prophets ==
=== Named in the Quran ===
There are 25 specific prophets and messengers named in the Quran, starting with Adam and ending with Muhammad, who is the final messenger. Believing in all of them is a core part of the Islamic faith. All messengers mentioned in the Quran are also prophets, but not all prophets are messengers. The table below lists the 25 prophets and messengers:

Prophets and messengers in the Quran
| No. | Arabic (transliteration) | Equivalent in other traditions | Messenger | Arch-prophet | Book | Sent to | Law (Sharia) | Alive | Notes |
|---|---|---|---|---|---|---|---|---|---|
| 1 | Ādam (آدَم) | Adam | Yes | No | | Earth | | No | First human being, first prophet and father of all humanity |
| 2 | ʾIdrīs (إِدْرِيس) | Enoch or Hermes Trismegistus | No | No | | Babylon | | No | "Raised... to an exalted place".: Historically taken to imply entering Heaven alive, strengthening an identification with Enoch, though some modern scholars dispute this. |
| 3 | Nūḥ (نُوح) | Noah | Yes | Yes | | Mesopotamia | Yes | No | Sent to the people of Noah. Survivor of the Great Flood |
| 4 | Hūd (هُود) | Eber | Yes | No | | ʿĀd | | No | Merchant sent to the ʿĀd tribe. |
| 5 | Ṣāliḥ (صَالِح) | Selah | Yes | No | | Thamud | | No | Camel breeder. Sent to the Thamud tribe. |
| 6 | ʾIbrāhīm (إِبْرَاهِيم) | Abraham | Yes | Yes | Scrolls of Abraham | Lower Mesopotamia | Yes | No | Sent to the people of Iraq and Syria. Builder of the Kaaba. Associated with the Scrolls of Abraham |
| 7 | Lūṭ (لُوط) | Lot | Yes | No | | Jordan Valley | | No | Sent to Sodom and Gomorrah. Did not live in Palestine, but was considered "brethren" by its inhabitants. |
| 8 | ʾIsmāʿīl (إِسْمَاعِيل) | Ishmael | Yes | No | | Mecca | | No | Sent to pre-Islamic Arabia. Became the founder of the Arabian people |
| 9 | ʾIsḥāq (إِسْحَاق) | Isaac | No | No | | Palestine | | No | Sent to Canaan. Founder of the Hebrew people. |
| 10 | Yaʿqūb (يَعْقُوب) | Jacob | No | No | | Israelites | | No | Founder of the Israelite people. |
| 11 | Yūsuf (يُوسُف) | Joseph | Yes | No | | Egypt | | No | Sent to Egypt. |
| 12 | ʾAyyūb (أَيُّوب) | Job | No | No | | Edom | | No | Sent to Edom. A model of patience. |
| 13 | Shuʿayb (شُعَيْب) | Jethro | Yes | No | | Midian | | No | Shepherd, sent to Midian |
| 14 | Mūsā (مُوسَىٰ) | Moses | Yes | Yes | Tawrah (Torah) Suhoof Musa (Scrolls of Moses) | Pharaoh and his establishment | Yes | No | Challenged the Pharaoh; lead the migration back to Israel. Associated with the Tawrah and Scrolls of Moses |
| 15 | Hārūn (هَارُون) | Aaron | Yes | No | | Pharaoh and his establishment | | No | Vizier, brother of Moses |
| 16 | Ḏū l-Kifli (ذُو ٱلْكِفْل) | Several possibilities suggested, including Ezekiel, Isaiah, Obadiah, and Buddha | No | No | | Babylonian Israelites | | No | |
| 17 | Dāūd (دَاوُۥد) | David | Yes | No | Zabur (Psalms) | Jerusalem | | No | Sent to Jerusalem. Military commander and third king of Israel and Judah (reigned around 1000 – 971BCE). Author of the Zabur |
| 18 | Sulaymān (سُلَيْمَان) | Solomon | No | No | | Jerusalem | | No | Sent to Jerusalem. Copperworker who became the fourth king of the Israel and Judah (reigned around 1000 – 971BCE). Built the First Temple; Son of Dawud. |
| 19 | ʾIlyās (إِلْيَاس) | Elijah | Yes | No | | Baalbek | | No | Silk weaver sent to the people of Ilyas (Children of Israel) |
| 20 | Alyasaʿ (ٱلْيَسَع) | Elisha | No | No | | Samaria | | No | Sent to the Children of Israel |
| 21 | Yūnus (يُونُس) | Jonah | Yes | No | | Nineveh | | No | Sent to the people of Yunus (Nineveh). Swallowed by a giant fish. |
| 22 | Zakariyyā (زَكَرِيَّا) | Zechariah | No | No | | Jerusalem | | No | Sent to Jerusalem and were assassinated. Zakkariyya was the father of Yaḥyā. |
| 23 | Yaḥyā (يَحْيَىٰ) | John the Baptist | No | No | | Jerusalem | | No | Sent to Jerusalem and were assassinated. Zakkariyya was the father of Yaḥyā. |
| 24 | ʿĪsā (عِيسَىٰ) | Jesus | Yes | Yes | Injil (Gospel) | Israelites | Yes | Yes | c. 4BCE – c. 33CE. The Messiah sent to the Children of Israel. Associated with the Injil |
| 25 | Muḥammad (مُحَمَّد) | | Yes | Yes | Quran | Universe | Yes | No | 570 – 632CE. Shepherd, merchant, completer of Islam; Seal of the Prophets, Islam's prophet sent to all humanity and jinn Compiler of the Quran |

=== Figures whose prophethood is debated ===
Figures whose prophethood is debated
| Name | Notes | Equivalent in other traditions |
|---|---|---|
| Šayṯ شَيْث | He does not appear in the Quran, but he is mentioned in Hadith. | Seth |
| Kālib كالب | Sent to Israel. | Caleb |
| Yūša bin Nun يُوشَع | Sent to Israel, Yusha (Joshua) is not mentioned by name in the Quran, but his name appears in other Islamic literature and in multiple Hadith. He is also named as a prophet in the Tawrat. In the Quranic account of the conquest of Canaan, Joshua and Caleb are referenced, but not named, as two men, on whom God "had bestowed His grace". Yusha is regarded by most scholars as to the prophetic successor to Musa (Moses). Joshua is the assistant of Moses when he visits al Khidr, and according to the Torah and the Bible, he was one of the two tribe messengers, along with Caleb that brought news that Jerusalem was habitable for the Jews. Joshua is also Moses's successor as the leader of the Jews, who led them to settle in Israel after Moses' death. Joshua (Yusha) entering into Jerusalem is also mentioned in the Hadith. | Joshua |
| al-Khaḍir ٱلْخَضِر | Sent to the seas, the oppressed peoples, Israel (Quran 18:65-82), Mecca, and all lands where a prophet exists The Quran mentions the mysterious Khidr (but does not name him). He is sometimes identified with Melchizedek, who is the figure that Moses accompanies on one journey. Although most Muslims regard him as an angel or enigmatic saint, some see him as a prophet as well. | Unknown, sometimes identified as Melchizedek, and sometimes equated with Elijah |
| Luqmān لُقْمَان | Sent to Ethiopia. The Quran mentions the sage Luqman in the chapter named after him, but does not clearly identify him as a prophet. The most widespread Islamic belief views Luqman as a saint, but not as a messenger, however, other Muslims regard Luqman as a messenger as well. The Arabic term wali is commonly translated into English as "Saint". This should not be confused with the Christian tradition of sainthood. | |
| Shamshû̅n شمشون | Various Islamic scholastic figures such as Wahb ibn Munabbih, Mujahid ibn Jabr, Ibn Kathir, Al-Tabari, Abu Ishaq al-Tha'labi, Ibn Abi Hatim, Ahmad ibn Muhammad al-Thalabi, and Badr al-Din al-Ayni has regarded Samson as prophet, and bestowing him the honorific "Peace Be Upon Him", as they based the prophetic status of Samson on the interpretation of the Quran verses of Ya-Sin and Al-Qadr chapters. | Samson |
| Ṣamūʾīl صَمُوئِيل | Not mentioned by name, only referred to as a messenger/prophet sent to the Israelites and who anoints Saul as a king. | Samuel |
| Ṭālūt طَالُوت | Some Muslims refer to Saul as Talut, and believe that he was the commander of Israel. Other scholars, however, have identified Talut as Gideon. According to the Qur'an, Talut was chosen by Samuel to lead them into war. Talut led the Israelites to victory over the army of Goliath, who was killed by Dawud (David). He is also named as a prophet in the Tawrat. According to some, Saul is not a prophet, but a divinely appointed king. | Saul or Gideon |
| Irmiyā إرميا | He does not appear in the Quran or any canonical hadith, but his narrative is fleshed out in Muslim literature and exegesis. He is also named as a prophet in the Tawrat (the Arabic-language name for the Torah within its context as an Islamic holy book). Some non-canonical hadith and tafsirs narrate that the Parable of the Hamlet in Ruins is about Irmiya. | Jeremiah |
| Hizqil حِزْقِيل | He is often identified as being the same figure as Dhul-Kifl, Although not mentioned in the Qur'an by the name, Muslim scholars, both classical and modern have included Ezekiel in lists of the prophets of Islam. | Ezekiel |
| Dāniyāl دَانِيَال | Usually considered by Muslims to be a prophet; he is not mentioned in the Qur'an, nor in Sunni Muslim hadith, but he is a prophet according to Shia Muslim hadith. He is also named as a prophet in the Tawrat. | Daniel |
| Ḏū l-Qarnayn ذُو ٱلْقَرْنَيْن | He appears in the Quran 18:83-101 as one who travels to east and west and erects a barrier between mankind and Gog and Magog (called Ya'juj and Ma'juj). | Traditionally believed to be Alexander the Great |
| Uzayr عُزَيْر | He is mentioned in the Quran, but he is not specified to have been a prophet, although many Islamic scholars hold Uzair to be one of the prophets. He is also named as a prophet in the Tawrat (the Arabic-language name for the Torah within its context as an Islamic holy book). | Ezra |
| Imrān عِمْرَان | The Family of Imran (Arabic: آل عمران) is the 3rd chapter of the Quran. Imran, not to be confused with Amram, is Arabic for the biblical figure Joachim, the father of Mary and maternal grandfather of Jesus. | Joachim |
| Maryam مَرْيَم | Some scholars regard Maryam (Mary) as a messenger and a prophetess, since God sent her a message through an angel and because she was a vessel for divine miracles. Among those who accepted the prophetess status of Maryam were Al-Qurtubi, Ibn Hazm, and Abu Hasan al-Ash'ari. However, Islamic scholars across generations from Hasan al-Basri of the Tabi'un generation; Al-Nawawi of medieval era Shafi'i school; Qadi Iyad of Maliki school; al-Juwayni the grand Imam of medieval Mecca and Medina; and modern scholars such as Muhammad Al-Munajjid and Umar Sulaiman Al-Ashqar stated that the consensus or majority of Islamic scholars rejected the prophet status of Mary and quoted the tradition from Hasan al-Basri that there are no prophets in Islam from women, or from Jinn. | Mary |

=== Other persons ===
The Quran mentions 25 prophets by name but also tells that God sent many other prophets and messengers, to all the different nations that have existed on Earth. Many verses in the Quran discuss this:

- "We did aforetime send messengers before thee: of them, there are some whose story We have related to thee, and some whose story We have not related to thee...."
- "For We assuredly sent amongst every People a messenger, ..."

==== In the Quran ====
- Sons of Jacob: These men are sometimes not considered to be prophets, although most exegesis scholars consider them to be prophets, citing the hadith of Muhammad and their status as prophets in Judaism. The reason that some do not consider them as prophets is because of their behavior with Yusuf (Joseph) and that they lied to their father.
- Ashab al-Kahf: The people of the cave, who slept about 300 years due to their piousness and sought refuge in the cave to escape religious persecution. They were mentioned in chapter 18 of the Quran.
- Three people of the town: These three unnamed people who were sent to the same town are mentioned in chapter 36 of the Quran.

==== In Islamic literature ====
Numerous other people have been mentioned by scholars in the Hadith, exegesis, commentary. These people include:

- Abel (Hābīl)
- Shem (Sām)
- Joel (Yūʾīl)
- Zechariah, son of Berechiah (Zakariyyā ibn Barkhiyyā)
- Amos (ʿĀmūs)
- Hosea (Hūshiʿ)
- Nahum (Nāḥūm)
- Isaiah (Ishaʿyāʾ)
- Elizabeth (Alyaṣṣābāt)

== Female prophets ==
The question of Mary's prophethood has been debated by Muslim theologians. Some Zahirite theologians argue that Mary, as well as Sara, the mother of Isaac, and Asiya, the mother of Moses, are prophets. They base this determination on the instances in the Quran where angels spoke to the women and divinely guided their actions. According to the Zahirite Ibn Hazm (d. 1064), women could possess prophethood (Arabic: نبوة, romanized: nubuwwah) but not messengerhood (Arabic: رسالة, romanized: risālah) which could only be attained by men. Ibn Hazm also based his position on Mary's prophethood on Q5:75 which refers to Mary as "a woman of truth" just as it refers to Joseph as "a man of truth" in Q12:46. Other linguistic examples which augment scholarship around Mary's position in Islam can be found in terms used to describe her. For example, In Q4:34 Mary is described as being one of the devoutly obedient (Arabic: قَانِتِين, romanized: qānitīn), the same description used for male prophets.

Challenges to Mary's prophethood have often been based on Q12:109 which reads "We have only sent men prior to you". Some scholars have argued that the use of the term "rijal" or men should be interpreted as providing a contrast between men and angels and not necessarily as contrasting men and women. The majority of scholars, particularly in the Sunni tradition, have rejected this doctrine as heretical innovation (Arabic: بدعة, romanized: bid'ah).

== Duty, emphasis, and obedience ==
=== Monotheism ===
The Quran states,

"And (remember) Abraham, when he said to his people: 'Worship Allah and fear Him; that is far better for you, if only you knew. Indeed, you only worship, apart from Allah, mere idols, and you invent falsehood. Surely, those you worship, apart from Allah, have no power to provide for you. So, seek provision from Allah, worship Him and give Him thanks. You shall be returned unto Him.'" (Q. 29:16-17)

This passage promotes Abraham's devotion to God as one of his messengers along with his monotheism. Islam is a monotheistic religion, and Abraham is one who is recognized for this transformation of the religious tradition. This prophetic aspect of monotheism is mentioned several times in the Quran. Abraham believed in one true God (Allah) and promoted an "invisible oneness" (tawḥīd) with him. The Quran proclaims, "Say: 'My lord has guided me to a Straight Path, a right religion, the creed of Abraham, an upright man who was no polytheist.'" (Q. 6:161) One push Abraham had to devote himself to God and monotheism is from the pagans of his time. Abraham was devoted to cleansing the Arabian Peninsula of this impetuous worship. His father was a wood idol sculptor, and Abraham was critical of his trade. Due to Abraham's devotion, he is recognized as the father of monotheism.

=== Eschatology ===
Prophets and messengers in Islam often fall under the typologies of nadhir ("warner") and bashir ("announcer of good tidings"). Many prophets serve as vessels to inform humanity of the eschatological consequences of not accepting God's message and affirming monotheism. A verse from the Quran reads: "Verily, We have sent thee [Muhammad] with the truth, as a bearer of glad tidings and a warner: and thou shalt not be held accountable for those who are destined for the blazing fire." (Q2:119) The prophetic revelations found in the Quran offer vivid descriptions of the flames of Hell that await nonbelievers but also describe the rewards of the gardens of Paradise that await the true believers. The warnings and promises transmitted by God through the prophets to their communities serve to legitimize Muhammed's message. The final revelation that is presented to Muhammed is particularly grounded in the belief that the Day of Judgement is imminent.

=== Obedience ===
Stories of the prophets in the Quran often revolve around a certain pattern, according to which a prophet is sent to a group of people, who then reject or attack him, and ultimately suffer extinction as God's punishment. However, the Quran, given its paraenetic character, does not offer a full narrative; but rather offers a parabolic reference to the doom of previous generations, assuming the audience is familiar with the told stories. The Quran emphasizes the importance of obedience to prophets in Surah 26 Ash-Shu'ara, in which a series of prophets preaching fear of God and obedience to themselves.

- verse 108 has Noah saying 'fear God and Obey me'
- verse 126 has Hud saying 'fear God and obey me'
- verse 144 has Salih saying 'fear God and obey me'
- verse 163 has Lot saying 'fear God and obey me'
- verse 179 has Shu'ayb saying 'fear God and obey me'

== Scriptures ==
=== The nature of revelation ===
During the time of Muhammad's revelation, the Arabian peninsula was made up of many pagan tribes. His birthplace, Mecca, was a central pilgrimage site and a trading center where many tribes and religions were in constant contact. Muhammad's connection with the surrounding culture was foundational to the way the Quran was revealed. Though it is seen as the direct word of God, it came through to Muhammad in his own native language of Arabic, which could be understood by all the peoples in the peninsula. This is the key feature of the Quran which makes it unique to the poetry and other religious texts of the time. It is considered immune to translation and culturally applicable to the context of the time it was revealed. Muhammad was criticized for his revelation being poetry which, according to the cultural perspective, is revelation purely originating from the jihn and the Qurash but the typology of duality and its likeness to the other prophets in the Abrahamic line affirms his revelation. This likeness is found in the complexity of its structure and its message of submission of faith to the one God, Allah. This also revels that his revelation comes from God alone and he is the preserver of the Straight Path as well as the inspired messages and lives of other prophets, making the Quran cohesive with the monotheistic reality in the Abrahamic traditions.

=== Holy books of Islam ===
The revealed books are the records which Muslims believe were dictated by God to various Islamic prophets throughout the history of mankind, all these books promulgated the code and laws of Islam. The belief in all the revealed books is an article of faith in Islam and Muslims must believe in all the scriptures to be a Muslim. Islam speaks of respecting all the previous scriptures.

The Quran mentions some Islamic scriptures by name:

- The "Tawrat" (also Tawrah or Taurat; Arabic: توراة) is the Arabic name for the Torah within its context as an Islamic holy book believed by Muslims to have been revealed to the prophets and messengers amongst the Children of Israel. When referring to traditions from the Tawrat, Muslims have not only identified it with the Pentateuch, but also with the other books of the Hebrew Bible as well as with Talmudic and Midrashim writings.
- The Quran mentions the Zabur, interpreted as being the Book of Psalms, as being the holy scripture revealed to King David (Dawud). Scholars have often understood the Psalms to have been holy songs of praise, and not a book administering law. Quran 21:105 and Psalm 37:29 are direct counterparts.
- Books of Divine Wisdom (Arabic: possibly identified as الْزُبُر az-Zubur): The Quran mentions certain Books of Divine Wisdom.
- The Injil (Gospel) was the holy book revealed to Jesus, according to the Quran. Although many lay Muslims believe the Injil refers to the entire New Testament, scholars have clearly pointed out that it refers not to the New Testament but to an original Gospel, which was sent by God, and was given to Jesus. Therefore, according to Muslim belief, the Gospel was the message that Jesus, being divinely inspired, preached to the Children of Israel. The current canonical Gospels, in the belief of Muslim scholars, are not divinely revealed but rather are documents of the life of Jesus, as written by various contemporaries, disciples and companions. These Gospels contain portions of Jesus's teachings but do not represent the original Gospel, which was a single book written not by a human but was sent by God.
- Quran: The Quran (Arabic: القرآن, romanized: al-Qurʼān) was the revelation revealed to Muhammad.
- Scrolls of Abraham (Arabic: صحف إبراهيم, Ṣuḥuf ʾIbrāhīm) are believed to have been one of the earliest bodies of scripture, which were given to Abraham (Ibrāhīm). Although usually referred to as "scrolls", many translators have translated the Arabic suhuf as "books". The verse mentioning the "Scriptures" is in Quran 87:18-19 where they are referred to, alongside the Scrolls of Moses, to have been "Books of Earlier Revelation".
- Scrolls of Moses (Arabic: صُحُفِ مُوسَىٰ, Ṣuḥuf Mūsā) are an ancient body of scripture mentioned twice in the Quran. They are part of the religious scriptures of Islam. Jordanian scholar and professor of philosophy Ghazi bin Muhammad mentions that the "Scrolls of Moses" are identical to the Torah of Moses.
- Book of Enlightenment (Arabic: الكِتَابُ ٱلْمُنِير, romanized: Kitābul-Munīr): The Quran mentions a Book of Enlightenment, which has alternatively been translated as Scripture of Enlightenment or the Illuminating Book.

== Other groups ==
=== Prophethood in Ahmadiyya ===
The Ahmadiyya Muslim Community does not believe that messengers and prophets are different individuals. They interpret the Quranic words warner (nadhir), prophet, and messenger as referring to different roles that the same divinely appointed individuals perform. Ahmadiyya distinguish only between law-bearing prophets and non-law-bearing ones. They believe that although law-bearing prophethood ended with Muhammad, non-law-bearing prophethood subordinate to Muhammad continues. The Ahmadiyya Muslim Community recognizes Mirza Ghulam Ahmad (1835–1908) as a prophet of God and the promised Messiah and Imam Mahdi of the latter days. The Lahore Ahmadiyya Movement rejects his status as a prophet, instead considering him to be a renewer of the faith. However, the majority of other Muslims argue that the Ahmadiyya Muslim Community are not Muslim.

=== Prophethood in the Baháʼí Faith ===
In contrast to the Muslims, Baháʼís do not believe that Muhammad is the final messenger of God, or rather define eschatology and end times references as metaphorical for changes in the ages or eras of mankind but that it and progress of God's guidance continues. Although, in common with Islam, the title the Seal of the Prophets is reserved for Muhammad, Baháʼís interpret it differently. They believe that the term Seal of the Prophets applies to a specific epoch, and that each prophet is the "seal" of his own epoch. Therefore, in the sense that all the prophets of God are united in the same "Cause of God", having the same underlying message, and all "abiding in the same tabernacle, soaring in the same heaven, seated upon the same throne, uttering the same speech, and proclaiming the same Faith", they can all claim to be "the return of all the Prophets".

== See also ==
- Glossary of Islam
- Outline of Islam
- Index of Islam-related articles
- Muslim Hebraists
- Islamic holy books
- Twelve Imams
- Succession to Muhammad
- Biblical narratives in the Quran
- List of people in both the Bible and the Quran
- Major prophets in the Bible
  - Prophets in Christianity
  - Prophets in Judaism
- Qisas al-Anbiya
- Table of prophets of Abrahamic religions
- Twelve Minor Prophets
- Islamic honorifics
