= Gilles Quispel =

Dutch theologian and historian of Christianity and Gnosticism

- Born: May 30, 1916; Rotterdam, Netherlands
- Died: March 2, 2006 (aged 89); El Gouna, Egypt
- Occupations: Theologian and historian of religion

Academic work
- Main interests: Gnosticism, early Christianity

Gilles Quispel (30 May 1916 – 2 March 2006) was a Dutch theologian and historian of Christianity and Gnosticism. He was professor of early Christian history at Utrecht University.

== Early life and education ==
Born in Rotterdam, he was the son of a blacksmith from Kinderdijk. He himself was not handy enough to become a blacksmith, and was thus sent to study at the gymnasium. He learned about Plato and gnosis from his teacher of ancient languages. After finishing secondary school in Dordrecht, Quispel studied classical philology from 1934 to 1941 at the Leiden University. He then became a secondary school teacher, but soon after went for the university, and he was appointed professor of the history of the early Church at Utrecht University in 1951, at the age of 35. He died in El Gouna, Egypt in 2006 during his holidays.

At Leiden, he also began to study theology, which he continued at the University of Groningen. Quispel completed his doctoral work in 1943 at Utrecht University with a dissertation examining the sources utilized in Tertullian's Adversus Marcionem. He devoted study to several Gnostic systems, particularly Valentinianism.

== Career and research ==
In 1948-1949, Quispel spent a year in Rome as a Bollingen fellow. Quispel served as a visiting professor at Harvard University in 1964-1965 and at the Katholieke Universiteit Leuven in 1968. He was engaged in first editing Nag Hammadi Codex I (the "Jung Codex") and devoted attention to the Nag Hammadi Library and particularly to the Gospel of Thomas throughout the rest of his career.

Quispel also made contributions to the study of early "Jewish-Christian" traditions as well as Tatian's Diatessaron (a second-century gospel harmony). He became emeritus on 1 March 1984. He published five more books afterwards, including a work on Valentinus. Together with J. van Oort, he published a work on the Cologne Mani Codex.

== Legacy ==
After Quispel's death, Johannes van Oort collected his works in Gnostica, Judaica, Catholica: Collected Essays of Gilles Quispel (2008). This book including unpublished essays, such as an important paper on Jesus in Islam, in which he argued that the origin of most of the Islamic sayings of Jesus were from Judeo-Christian / Jewish Christian sources (as opposed to Gentile Christians).

== Publications ==
- De bronnen van Tertullianus' Adversus Marcionem, thesis, Leiden, 1943.
- The Original Doctrine of Valentine, Amsterdam, North-Holland 1947.
- A Jewish Source of Minucius Felix, 1949.
- Gnosis als Weltreligion, 1951
- Het getuigenis der ziel bij Tertullianus (inaugurele rede Utrecht), 1952
- Tertulliani De testimonio animae., 1952
- Op zoek naar het evangelie der waarheid (with H.Ch. Puech; on the Codex Jung), 1954
- The Jung Codex : a newly recovered gnostic papyrus. Three studies (met H.C. Puech and W.C. van Unnik), 1955
- Evangelium veritatis. Codex Jung f.VIIIv-XVIv / f.XIXr-XXIIr (with Michel Malinine and Henri-Charles Puech), 1956
- Het evangelie naar de beschrijving van Thomas (with A. Guillaumont and H.-Ch. Puech, 1959, 1991, 2005)
- Het Luikse 'Leven van Jezus' en het jodenchristelijke 'Evangelie der Hebreeën’, 1958
- Makarius, das Thomasevangelium und das Lied von der Perle, 1967
- Faust: Symbol of Western Man, 1967.
- Gnosis and The New Sayings of Jesus, Rhein-Verlag, 1971.
- Het Evangelie van Thomas en de Nederlanden., 1971
- The Birth of The Child: Some Gnostic and Jewish Aspects, Leiden: Brill 1973.
- From Mythos to Logos, Leiden: Brill 1973.
- Gnosis and Psychology, Leiden: Brill 1973.
- Gnostic Studies, 2 vols., Istanbul, 1974.
- Tatian and the Gospel of Thomas: Studies in the History of the Western Diatessaron, Leiden: Brill 1975. ISBN 90-04-04316-0
- Van Unnik als geleerde (herdenkingsrede), 1978
- Het geheime boek der openbaring. Het laatste boek van de bijbel (also translated into English: The Secret Book of Revelation: The Last Book of The Bible, New York: McGraw-Hill, 1979. ISBN 978-0070510807 and French.
- Jewish and Gnostic Man, (Eranos Lecures) 1986.
- De Hermetische Gnosis in de loop der eeuwen (also translated to German), 1992
- Corpus Hermeticum (with Roelof van den Broek), 1993
- Asclepius; De volkomen openbaring van Hermes Trismegistus, 1996
- Een jongetje uit Kinderdijk. Herinneringen van Gilles Quispel, 2001
- Valentinus de gnosticus en zijn Evangelie der waarheid., 2003
- Het Evangelie van Thomas. Uit het Koptisch vertaald en toegelicht, In de Pelikaan Bibliotheca Philosophica Hermetica, 2004
- De Keulse Mani-Codex (with Johannes van Oort), 2005
- Gnostica, Judaica, Catholica. Collected Essays of Gilles Quispel (redactie Johannes van Oort), 2008
- Hermetische geschriften (with Roelof van den Broek), 2016

== Commemorative books ==
- Quispel, Gilles (2008). Gnostica, Judaica, Catholica: collected essays of Gilles Quispel. Leiden: Brill. ISBN 978-90-474-4182-3. OCLC 568738204.
- R. van den Broek and M. J. Vermaseren (eds.), Studies in Gnosticism and Hellenistic Religions: Presented to Gilles Quispel on the Occasion of His 65th Birthday (Leiden 1981) ISBN 90-04-06376-5
