= Alexander J. Mazur =

American scholar

- Born: 1969; United States
- Died: August 2016 (aged 46–47); United States
- Other name: Zeke Mazur
- Occupation: Historian of philosophy

Academic background
- Education: University of Chicago
- Thesis: The Platonizing Sethian Gnostic background of Plotinus' mysticism (2010)
- Doctoral advisor: Michael Sells, Kevin Corrigan, and John D. Turner

Academic work
- Discipline: History of philosophy History of religion
- Main interests: Neoplatonism; Gnosticism; Late antiquity

Alexander J. Mazur (1969 – August 2016; also known as Zeke Mazur) was an American scholar specializing in Neoplatonism, Gnosticism, and mysticism. Mazur is noted for his work on the relationship between Neoplatonism and Gnosticism. He is the son of Barry Mazur.

== Education and career ==
Mazur majored in Philosophy and Classical Studies with a minor in Religion at the University of Massachusetts at Boston, graduating summa cum laude with a B.A. in June 1999. He then attended the University of Chicago for his graduate studies, where he obtained his M.A. in May 2002 and graduated with a Ph.D. in August 2010. His doctoral thesis, The Platonizing Sethian Gnostic background of Plotinus' mysticism, was supervised by Michael Sells, Kevin Corrigan, and John D. Turner. Afterwards, he worked as a Postdoctoral Fellow at Université Laval.

Mazur died in August 2016. His book The Platonizing Sethian background of Plotinus's mysticism was published posthumously by Brill in 2021.

== Published articles ==
A selection of Mazur's published articles:

- 2013a. "The Platonizing Sethian Gnostic Interpretation of Plato's Sophist," pp. 469–493 in A. D. DeConick, G. Shaw, and J. D. Turner, eds. Practicing Gnosis: Ritual, Magic, Theurgy, and Other Ancient Literature. Essays in Honor of Birger A. Pearson. [Nag Hammadi and Manichaean Studies 85]. Leiden: Brill, 2013.
- 2013b. "‘Those Who Ascend to the Sanctuaries of the Temples': The Gnostic Context of Plotinus' First Treatise, I.6[1] On Beauty," pp. 329–368 in K. Corrigan and T. Rasimus et al., eds. Gnosticism, Platonism, and the Late Ancient World. Essays in Honour of John D. Turner. [Nag Hammadi and Manichaean Studies 82]. Leiden: Brill, 2013.
- 2013c."Traces of the Competition Between the Platonizing Sethian Gnostics and Plotinus' Circle: The Case of Zostrianos 44—46," in M. P. Marsola and L. Ferroni, eds. Estratégias anti-gnósticas nos escritos de Plotino. Atas do colóquio internacional realizado em São Paulo em 18-19 de março 2012. São Paulo: Rosari et Paulus, 2013.
- 2009. "Having Sex with the One: Erotic Mysticism in Plotinus and the Problem of Metaphor," pp. 67–83 in P. Vassilopoulou and S. R. L. Clark, eds. Late Antique Epistemology: Other Ways to Truth. Houndmills, Basingstoke: Palgrave Macmillan, 2009.
- 2008a. "Harmonius Opposition (Part I): Pythagorean Themes of Cosmogonic Mediation in the Roman Mysteries of Mithras," pp. 203–222 in Á. Szábo and P. Vargyas, eds. Cultus Deorum. Studia Religionum ad Historiam, vol 2. De Rebus Aetatis Graecorum et Romanorum. In Memoriam István Tóth. [Ókortudományi Dolgozatok nr. 2]. Pécs — Budapest: University of Pécs, 2008.
- 2008b. "Unio Intellectualis? A Response to Professor Werner Beierwaltes on Unio Magica," Dionysius 26 (2008): 193–200.
- 2005. "Plotinus' Philosophical Opposition to Gnosticism and the Axiom of Continuous Hierarchy," pp. 95–112 in J. Finamore and R. Berchman, eds. History of Platonism: Plato Redivivus. New Orleans: University Press of the South, 2005.
- 2004. "Unio Magica, Part 2: Plotinus, Theurgy, and the Question of Ritual," Dionysius 22 (2004): 29–56.
- 2003. "Unio Magica, Part 1: On the Magical Origins of Plotinus' Mysticism," Dionysius 21 (2003): 23–52.

== Co-edited volumes ==
- Corrigan, Kevin; Rasimus, Tuomas, eds. (2013). Gnosticism, Platonism and the late ancient world: essays in honour of John D. Turner. Leiden: Brill. ISBN 978-90-04-25476-3. OCLC 857800490.
