= Zaqqum =

Tree in the Quran

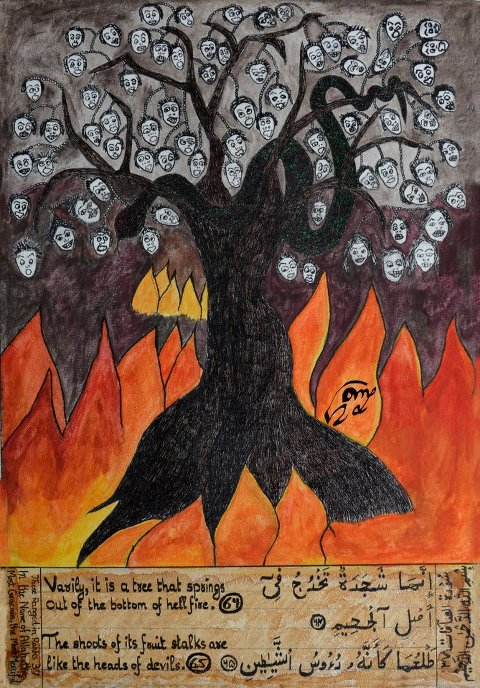
Zaqqoum, the fruit of the dwellers of Jahannam.

In Islam, the Zaqqum is a cursed tree that is rooted in the center of Jahannam. It is first mentioned in the Quran (17:60; 37:62–68; 44:43; 56:52), three times by name, as a tree that produces fruits that is fed to the inhabitants of hell to burn their stomachs, before they are also fed boiling liquids.

In Islamic exegesis and modern scholarship, the Zaqqum tree has also been related to Surat al-Masad, which cryptically describes a figure whose title is Abu Lahab.

== Etymology ==
Al-Tabari claimed in his Tafsir that the word Zaqqum comes from a word meaning "bitter", although this gloss has not been accepted. Other grammarians believed it was a loanword from outside of Arabic, a view accepted by modern specialists, although the exact etymology is debated. According to Emran El-Badawi, proposals for the word's etymology have included:

... Aramaic ziqta meaning “goad;” Akkadian ziqtu meaning “spike;” or Middle Persian zaxm meaning “wound.” ... Others consider it a loanword from Greek sykon meaning “fig,” connected to the “accursed tree in the recitations” (Q 17:60), the tree of knowledge (Genesis 2:9), and the intervening Christian teachings about the “tree of death.”

== Historical origin ==
The idea of the Zaqqum tree may be rooted in Christian traditions surrounding the "Tree of Death" in relation to the Book of Genesis. In the Garden of Eden, the devil took on the form of a serpent and infected the Tree of the Knowledge of Good and Evil before tempting Adam and Eve to eat from it. The infected and poisoned fruits produced by this Tree are the bitter fruits eaten by those tormented in Hell. In particular, Quranic elements of an evil tree producing bitter fruit for the damned has been related to a passage found in the Apocryphon of John (2nd century AD):

And the archons took him and placed him in paradise. And they said to him, “Eat, that is at leisure,” for their luxury is bitter and their beauty is depraved. And their luxury is deception and their trees are godlessness and their fruit is deadly poison and their promise is death. And the tree of their life they had placed in the midst of paradise. “And I shall teach you what is the mystery of their life, which is the plan which they made together, which is the likeness of their spirit. The root of this (tree) is bitter and its branches are death, its shadow is hate and deception is in its leaves, and its blossom is the ointment of evil, and its fruit is death and desire is its seed, and it sprouts in darkness. The dwelling place of those who taste from it is Hades, and the darkness is their place of rest. (§21)

A similar description, also related by historians to the description found in the Quran, has been identified in a 5th-century Manichaean text known as the Kephalaia, as well as the Book of Hierothos, a 6th-century Syriac text attributed to Stephen bar Sudayli.

Emran El-Badawi has further argued that the hellish topography of the Quran is related to including a multitude in hell (involving both people and idols) eating from the tree and then drinking from a scalding hot spring is related to traditions concerning the burning of the Asherah idol in the Bible. For example, the Asherah idol is described as a "spreading tree", related to the Zaqqum tree which originates in the center of hell and then radiates outwards (Quran 37:64). Later in the same surah, Baal is condemned (v. 125), who in the Canaanite pantheon, was Asherah's consort.

Others have emphasized a rabbinic context for the Zaqqum tree and its associated torment of the use of a molten metal.

== Quran ==
The Zaqqum tree is one of the five categories of trees mentioned in the Quranic cosmology, the others being fruit trees, olive trees, palm trees, and lote trees. In the Quran, there is a contrast between the Zaqqum tree and a healing gourd tree grown for the prophet Jonah (37:63, 146), a story going back to the biblical Book of Jonah 4:6–11.

One description of the Zaqqum tree in the Quran reads like this:

[44.43] Surely the tree of Zaqqum,
[44.44] Is the food of the sinful
[44.45] Like dregs of oil; it shall boil in (their) bellies,
[44.46] Like the boiling of hot water.

The fruits of Zaqqum are shaped like heads of devils (Qur'an 37:62-68). Some Islamic scholars believe in a literal meaning of this tree grown in fire, showing the inverted flora of hell. The inhabitants of hell are forced to eat the tree's fruits, which tears their bodies apart and releases bodily fluids as a punishment. According to Umar Sulaiman Al-Ashqar, once the palate of the sinners is satiated, the fruit in their bellies churns like burning oil. Other scholars suggest the tree is grown by the seeds of the evil deeds of the sinners, therefore the devilish fruits are the fruits of their bad actions during their lifetime. As ibn Arabi stated, the tree stands for the arrogant self.

== Botany ==
The name zaqqum has been applied to the species Euphorbia abyssinica by the Beja people in eastern Sudan. In Jordan, it is applied to the species Balanites aegyptiaca. Volney describes the Balanites aegyptiaca tree as a

”species called Zakkoun, which produces a sweet oil, also celebrated for healing wounds. This Zakkoun resembles a plum-tree; it has thorns four inches long, with leaves like those of the olive-tree, but narrower greener, and prickly at the end; its fruit is a kind of acorn, without calix, under the bark of which is a pulp, and then a nut, the kernel of which gives an oil that the Arabs sell very dear: this is the sole commerce of Raha, which is no more than a ruinous village."

In Turkey, zakkum is the vernacular for Nerium oleander; and zıkkım, a Turkish cognate, means "poison".

== Sources ==
- El-Badawi, Emran (2024). Female Divinity in the Qur’an In Conversation with the Bible and the Ancient Near East. Palgrave Macmillan.
- Zellentin, Holger (2016). "Q 44:43–57". In Azaiez, Mehdi; Reynolds, Gabriel; Tesei, Tommaso; Zafer, Hamza (eds.). The Qur’an Seminar Commentary. De Gruyter. pp. 342–343.
