= Elisha in Islam =

Prophet in Islam

Prophet Alyasa Alayhi as-Salam
- اليسع; Elisha
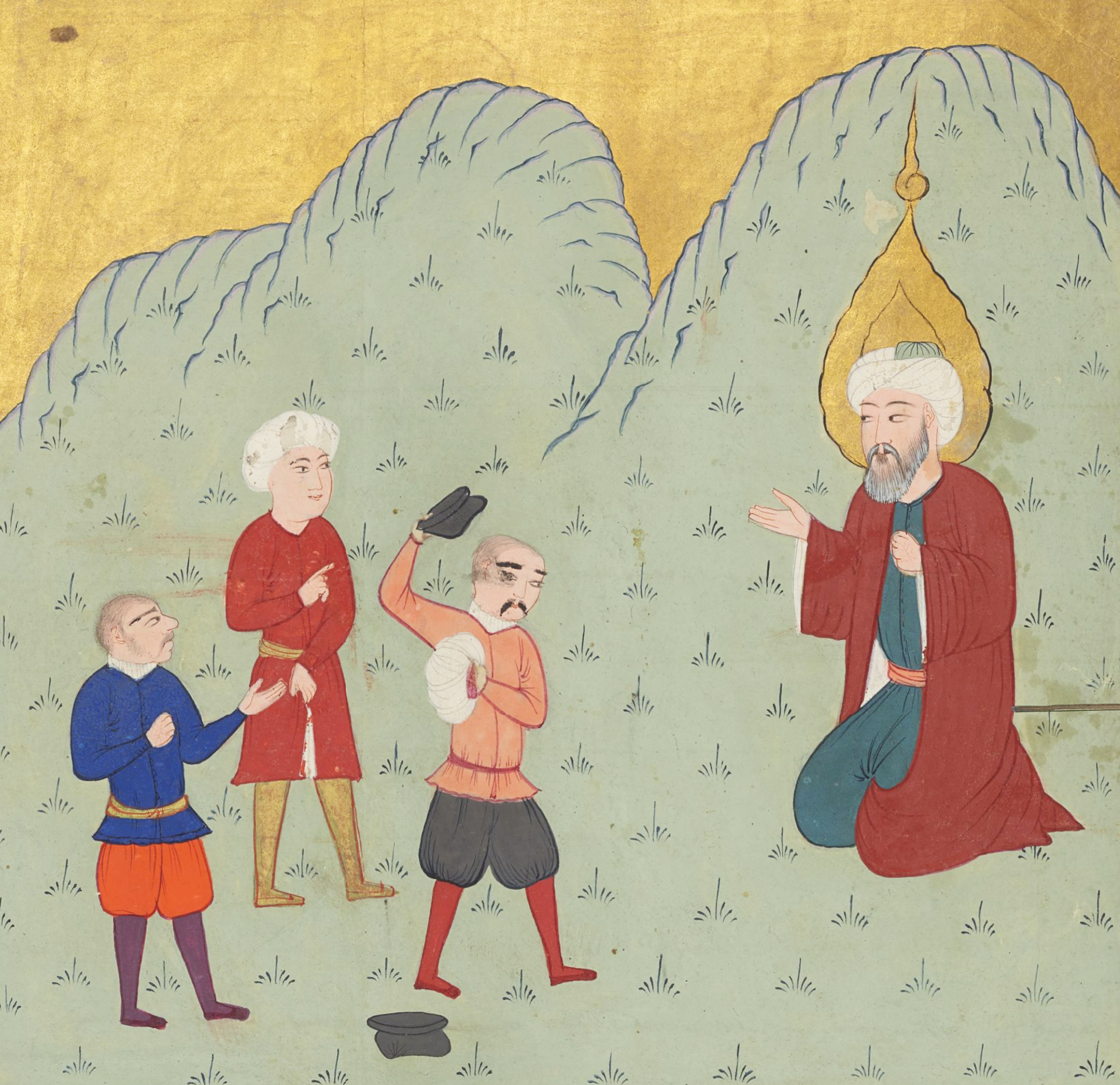
- Alyasa (right) picking his successor.

Prophet of Islam
- Preceded by: Ilyas
- Succeeded by: Yunus

Personal life
- Born: Alyasa Ash-Sham
- Died: Ash-Sham

Religious life
- Religion: Islam

Muslim leader
- Influenced by: Ilyas

Alyasa (Arabic: اليسع, romanized: Alyasaʿ) in Islam is a prophet of God who was sent to guide the Children of Israel (Jacob). In the Quran, Alyasa is mentioned twice as a noble prophet, and is mentioned both times alongside fellow prophets. He is honored by Muslims as the prophetic successor to Ilyas (Elijah). Islamic sources that identify Elisha with Khidr cite the strong relationship between Khidr and Ilyas in Islamic tradition.

== Personality ==
The name of Alyasa is mentioned twice in Al-An'am 6:86 and Sad 38:48. In those verses, without mentioning anything about the personality or prophethood of Alyasa, he is mentioned as "graced" and "among the elect". According to the Quran, Elisha is exalted "above the rest of creation" (Arabic: فَضَّلْنَا عَلَى ٱلْعَالَمِين, romanized: faḍḍalnā ʿala l-ʿālamīn(a) and is "among the excellent" (Arabic: مِنَ ٱلْأَخْيَار, romanized: mina l-akhyār). Alyasa is mentioned in Al-An'am 6:86 and Sad 38:48, along with Ismail:

And Ismail and Alyasa and Yunus, and Lut; and each one We graced over the worlds;

— Al-An'am 6:86

And remember Our servants Ismail, Alyasa, and Dhul-Kifl, each of them truly good.

— Sad 38:48

According to Islamic tradition, approximately four thousand prophets were sent between Moses and Jesus. Among the prominent prophets mentioned are Joshua, Elijah, Elisha, Samuel, David, Solomon, Isaiah, Jeremiah, Jonah, Ezra, Ezekiel, Zechariah, John the Baptist and Simeon. All of them preached the commandments of the Torah, following a single divine law. Whenever the Israelites showed negligence in carrying out divine injunctions, these prophets sought to correct them, as well as to reform scholars who were seen as distorting or corrupting the Torah. Prophethood was completed with Muhammad, after whom the service of religion has been continued by scholars and saints.

== Claimed tombs ==
Some Muslims believe the tomb of Alyasa is in Al-Awjam in the eastern region of Saudi Arabia. The shrine was removed by the Saudi Government because such veneration is not in accordance with the Wahhabi or Salafi reform movement dominant in Saudi Arabia. It had been an important landmark for many centuries during the time of Ottoman Arabia, and had been a very popular pilgrimage destination for Muslims of all sects throughout the pre-modern period.

The grave of Elisha is present in the Eğil district of Diyarbakir Province, Turkey. The original shrine was near a riverbed that was to be flooded in 1994. A secret board of nine scholars was formed by the city council in cooperation with the Directorate of Religious Affairs to avoid drawing the ire of the public to the exhumation. Before the area was flooded, the grave was dug at night and the preserved body of the prophet - witnessed by the nine scholars and official workers - was exhumed to be buried on a hill overlooking the flooded plain. However, many of the townfolk saw the prophet in their dream that night, and turned out before sunrise to observe his reburial in the new spot.
