= Hans-Martin Schenke =

German professor

- Born: April 25, 1929; Oschersleben, Germany
- Died: September 4, 2002 (aged 73); Berlin, Germany
- Occupation: Professor

Academic background
- Education: Humboldt University of Berlin
- Thesis: Die Orakel im Alten Ägypten (1960)

Academic work
- Notable students: Wolf-Peter Funk
- Main interests: Gnosticism, New Testament, Coptology

Hans-Martin Schenke (April 25, 1929, in Oschersleben – September 4, 2002, in Berlin) was a German Protestant theologian, New Testament scholar, and Coptologist known for his pioneering studies on Gnosticism and Coptic manuscripts.

== Biography ==
Schenke studied at the Humboldt University of Berlin from 1950 to 1956. His received his Doctorate in Theology (Dr. Theol.) in New Testament Studies at the Humboldt University of Berlin, in 1956, with his thesis titled Das Verhältnis von Indikativ und Imperativ bei Paulus. He then obtained a doctorate in Egyptology in 1960, completing the thesis Die Orakel im Alten Ägypten, and finished his habilitation in New Testament Studies later that year, with the dissertation Der Gott "Mensch" in der Gnosis. Ein religionsgeschichtlicher Beitrag zur Diskussion über die paulinische Anschauung von der Kirche als Leib Christi. From 1960 to 1964, he first taught as a lecturer, then from 1964 to 1994 as Professor of New Testament Studies at the Faculty of Theology of the Humboldt University of Berlin. After his retirement, he was a visiting professor for several years at Laval University in Quebec, Canada, and at Claremont Graduate University in California, United States.

== Works (selected) ==
- Die Herkunft des sogenannten Evangelium Veritatis. Berlin/Göttingen 1959.
- Koptisch-gnostische Schriften aus den Papyrus-Codices von Nag-Hammadi [with Johannes Leipoldt]. Hamburg 1960.
- Der Gott "Mensch" in der Gnosis. Ein religionsgeschichtlicher Beitrag zur Diskussion über die paulinische Anschauung von der Kirche als Leib Christi. Berlin/Göttingen 1962.
- Die Berliner Handschrift der sahidischen Apostelgeschichte (P.15926) [with Fritz Hintze]. Berlin 1970.
- Einleitung in die Schriften des Neuen Testaments (with Karl Martin Fischer). Zwei Bände. Evangelische Verlagsanstalt. Berlin 1978/79.
- Das Matthäus-Evangelium im mittelägyptischen Dialekt des Koptischen (Codex Scheide). Berlin 1981.
- Das Thomas-Buch (Nag-Hammadi-Codex II,7). Berlin 1989, ISBN 3-05-000564-5.
- Apostelgeschichte 1,1 – 15,3 im mittelägyptischen Dialekt des Koptischen (Codex Glazier). Berlin 1991, ISBN 3-05-000563-7.
- Das Philippus-Evangelium (Nag-Hammadi-Codex II, 3). Akademie-Verlag, Berlin 1997, ISBN 3-05-003199-9.
- Das Matthäus-Evangelium im mittelägyptischen Dialekt des Koptischen (Codex Schoyen). Oslo 2001.
- Der Same Seths. Hans-Martin Schenkes „Kleine Schriften“ zu Gnosis, Koptologie und Neuem Testament, Gesine Robinson, Gesa Schenke, Uwe-Karsten Plisch (Hrsg.). Leiden 2012, ISBN 90-04-22390-8.
