= Exegesis on the Soul =

Ancient text from the Nag Hammadi Library

The Exegesis on the Soul is one of the ancient texts found at Nag Hammadi, in Codex II. The text emphasizes the importance of prayer and repentance. It states that prayer should be done not just with words but with the spirit, which comes from within, and should involve confessing sins, recognizing past deception, mourning past actions, and even hating oneself. The beginning of salvation is repentance, and the Father is good and loving, and will hear the soul that calls out to him. The text references Biblical passages and stories from Greek mythology to illustrate its points, such as the story of Odysseus and Helen, and the Psalms. It is said that through repentance and sighing, God will have pity on the soul and restore it to its original state. The text concludes by emphasizing God's mercy and His willingness to hear the prayers of those who truly repent.

According to Irenaeus, this teaching was a foundational pillar of the doctrine of Simon Magus, which Simon viewed as so important that he actually married a prostitute and elevated her in society in order to demonstrate the point. Hence, it is possible that the text was written by the Simonian school of Gnostics.

The text quotes copiously from the Old Testament prophets, from the New Testament gospels, and from the Pauline epistles. The text also quotes from Homer's Odyssey, which is given equally authoritative weight. These quotes indicate that the author viewed Greek legend and mythology as a type of scripture, just as the author also viewed large portions of the Old and New Testaments as scripture.

The author and date are not certain, however is likely from between the 1st century AD and the 4th century AD. Although it is silent concerning the typical Gnostic cosmology, its placement in the same codex with such texts as the Apocryphon of John, Hypostasis of the Archons, and On the Origin of the World indicate that it may well have been produced by a school which accepted Gnostic cosmology. In this context, the female personification of the soul resembles the passion of Sophia, which is a theme pervasively found in Gnostic cosmology. Also, the text's placement toward the back of the codex may indicate that it was written later and/or was of relatively lesser importance than the other texts in the codex.

== Summary ==
The opening describes the soul as having a feminine nature, with a womb, and initially being in an androgynous form while alone with her father. However, when the soul fell into a body and entered this life, it was taken advantage of by various men and became a whore. Despite attempting to leave these relationships, the soul found herself in a helpless and desolate state, with offspring from the adulterers being disturbed. The soul then called out to her father for help and was deemed worthy of his mercy due to her afflictions from abandoning her house.

The text continues to address the issue of the prostitution of the soul, which is seen as a major issue. The holy spirit is said to prophesy about this in different places, such as in the prophets Jeremiah, Hosea, and Ezekiel. The messengers of the savior command to guard against both the prostitution of the body and especially the soul, as Paul wrote to the Corinthians about avoiding association with whores. The greatest struggle is said to be the prostitution of the soul, which is not against flesh and blood but against the world rulers of darkness and evil spirits.

Discussion of the prostitution of the soul continues with how it leads to the troubles and punishment of the soul. The text explains that when the soul perceives her troubles and repents, the father will cleanse her and turn her womb inward. This is her baptism, which involves regaining her original nature and becoming pure again. The father then sends down the firstborn, who is the bridegroom, to be with the bride, who has cleansed herself in the bridal chamber. She no longer engages in promiscuous behavior, but instead waits for the true groom and dreams of him.

The text then describes a spiritual marriage between the soul and her true love and master, who is sent down to her by the father. This marriage is different from carnal marriage and reunites the soul with her true love and master, bringing her back to her former happiness. The soul recognizes her true love and adorns herself so that he may be pleased to stay with her. She is told to turn away from her former people and the gang of adulterers, to devote herself to her king and remember her father in heaven. The soul is encouraged to leave her earthly ties and kin and to forget her father's house.

The writing continues with a description of the soul's journey towards spiritual renewal and salvation. The soul is compared to a bride who must turn away from her past promiscuity and be cleansed, waiting for her true love (the divine). This true love then comes to her in the bridal chamber and they make love, producing the seed (life-giving spirit). This union is the soul's rejuvenation and leads to her salvation, which is not dependent on human efforts or knowledge but rather a gift from a merciful God. The soul will eventually rise, praising the father and her brother, who rescued her, and be saved through rebirth. This is the soul's resurrection from the dead, ransom from captivity, and ascent to heaven and the father. Salvation only comes through the grace of God, who draws people to the savior, who will raise them on the last day.

Prayer and repentance are important in achieving salvation. It is emphasized that prayer should be made from within, with the soul and not just with the lips. Repentance, which is seen as the beginning of salvation, should come from distress and sorrow. The text mentions that the father is good and loves humankind and will hear the soul that calls him. It cites passages from scripture that emphasize the importance of returning to the father and sighing, so that one may be saved. The text mentions that the lord will have pity on those who lament and that those who deceive will not be able to harm those who have repented.

The text encourages people to pray to God night and day, with sincerity and without hypocrisy, so that they can be worthy of salvation. God examines their inner selves and bottom of their hearts to see who is worthy. The soul needs to turn away from the deception and return to its perfect husband by sighing and repenting. The example of Israel is given, which was brought out of the land of Egypt and house of bondage by sighing to God and weeping about its oppressive labors. If people repent, God will hear them and help them, because he is merciful.
