= Einar Thomassen =

Norwegian religious studies scholar (born 1951)

Einar Thomassen (born 25 April 1951) is a Norwegian religious studies scholar.

== Career ==
Thomassen was in Bergen, and grew up in Laksevåg. He was taught Coptic, Greek and Latin already during Bergen Cathedral School. He studied in Sweden, France, and Scotland. He took the mag.art. degree at the University of Bergen, and the PhD at the University of St. Andrews.

Thomassen is a professor at the University of Bergen, and also an adjunct professor at the University of Aarhus. He lectures in Christianity, Islam, Religion of the Antique and Classical World, pre-Islamic Middle-East, Syncretism, and Method.

He is a member of the Norwegian Academy of Science and Letters.

== Selected writings in English ==
- The tripartite tractate from Nag Hammadi (1982)
- The Platonic and the Gnostic "Demiurge" (1993)
- The Letters of Ahmad Ibn Idris (1993)
- "Musings on 'syncretism'" (2004)
- Religious Education in a Pluralistic Society: Experiences from Norway (2006)
- The Spiritual Seed: the church of the 'Valentinians' (Leiden - Boston: Brill, 2006)
- Before Valentinus: The Gnostics of Irenaeus (Leiden - Boston: Brill, 2023)

== Festschrifts ==
- Thomassen, Einar (2012). Mystery and secrecy in the Nag Hammadi collection and other ancient literature: ideas and practices: studies for Einar Thomassen at sixty. Leiden: Brill. ISBN 978-90-04-21512-2. OCLC 777549415.

== Personal life ==
He lives in Bønes with his wife, whom he met while studying religious studies in the 1970s. They have two sons.
