= Madeleine Scopello =

French researcher and research director (born 1953)

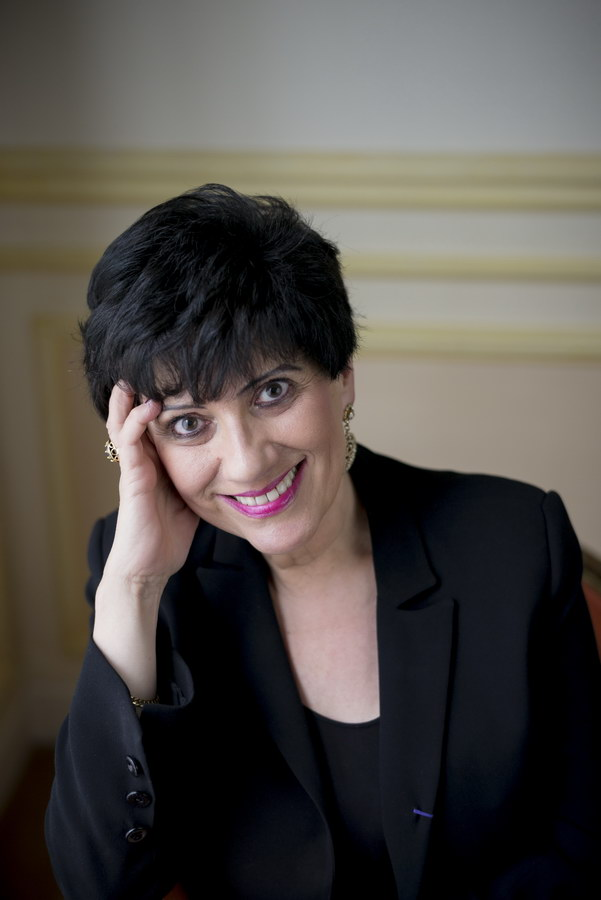
- Scopello in 2014
- Born: Maria Maddalena Scopello; 4 November 1953 (age 72); Turin, Italy
- Occupation: Researcher
- Awards: Ordre des Palmes académiques

Academic background
- Education: University of Turin; Paris-Sorbonne University

Academic work
- Discipline: History of religion
- Sub-discipline: Gnosticism and Manichaeism
- Institutions: CNRS

Maria Maddalena (Note: Also hyphenated as Maria-Maddalena, according to French usage.) "Madeleine" Scopello (born 4 November 1953) is a French historian of religion. She is director of research at the CNRS (UMR 8167 "Orient et Méditerranée", Classical and Late Antiquity, Paris-Sorbonne) and director of studies at the École pratique des hautes études (chair of Gnosticism and Manichaeism). She also teaches at the Institut catholique de Paris, Faculty of History (History of Ancient Christianity).

== Education ==
Madeleine Scopello holds a doctorate in literature from the University of Turin, Faculty of Letters and Philosophy (thesis on the history of Christianity, graduated magna cum laude in 1977) and a habilitation, obtained in 2006 at Paris-Sorbonne University.

== Research ==
As a historian of Late Antique religions, Madeleine Scopello is a specialist in Gnosticism and Manichaeism, working on both primary and secondary literature of Coptic, Greek, and Latin texts. She also works on religious doctrine, history and society, and studies on women. Her research also focuses on Jewish and mystical literature, patristic texts, Christian apocrypha and religious polemic literature.

In 2006, she organized the first international colloquium on the Coptic Gospel of Judas (October 27–28, 2006, proceedings published under her direction in 2008). She also co-organized "Les forces du bien et du mal dans les premiers siècles de l'Église" (Université de Tours, 11-13/09/2008), with B. Pouderon and Y.M. Blanchard and "Les textes de Nag Hammadi: Histoire des religions et approches contemporaines" (Académie des Inscriptions et Belles-Lettres, 11-12/12/2008), with J.-P. Mahé and P.-H. Poirier. In 2014, she organized the international colloquium "Les femmes dans le manichéisme occidental et oriental", Université Paris-Sorbonne, Maison de la Recherche (27-28/06/2014).

== Affiliations ==
- Labex-Resmed (member)
- Société Asiatique
- Association Francophone de Coptologie (founding member)
- International Association of Coptic Studies (IACS)
- Société d’histoire des religions Ernest-Renan
- International Association of Manichaean Studies (IAMS)
- Association Antiquité tardive
- Institut pour la recherche de l’étude des religions (IRER)
- Association des Amis de la Fondation Maison des sciences de l’homme (FMSH)
- Chapman University Proceedings (California)
- Groupe de recherche sur le christianisme ancien et l’Antiquité tardive (GRECAT), Université Laval, Québec
- Groupe suisse d’études patristiques

== Editorial work ==
Scopello is a member of the editorial boards of:

- "Nag Hammadi and Manichaean Studies" series, Leiden, Brill
- Rivista di Storia e Letteratura Religiosa, Turin/Florence, Leo Olschki
- Gnosis (review), Leiden, Brill
- Le Monde des religions (review) (Groupe Le Monde)

She is also the director of the Religions in History series by Presses Universitaires Paris-Sorbonne (PUPS), which was started in 2006.

== Books and articles (selected) ==
- L’Exégèse de l’âme, introd., trans., commentary, Leiden, Brill, ed. Nag Hammadi studies, 1985.
- Les Gnostiques, Paris, Cerf, 1991 [traduction italienne: Gli Gnostici, Milan, Ed. Paoline, 1993].
- L’Allogène (Nag Hammadi XI, 3), with W.-P. Funk, P.-H. Poirier et J. D. Turner, ed. Bibliothèque copte de Nag Hammadi. Section Textes, Québec, Presses de l’Université Laval & Louvain, Peeters, 2004 [trans. française du texte copte, p. 189-239].
- Femme, Gnose et manichéisme: de l'espace du mythique au territoire du réel, Leiden, Brill, ed. Nag Hammadi and Manichaean studies, 2005.
- Saint Augustin, Sur la Genèse contre les Manichéens; Sur la Genèse au sens littéral: livre inachevé, with A.-I. Bouton, M. Dulaey & P. Monat., ed. Bibliothèque augustinienne, Paris, Institut d’études augustiniennes, 2005 [Introduction. II: La polémique d’Augustin avec le manichéisme, p. 82-154].
- Les Évangiles apocryphes, ed. Petite bibliothèque des spiritualités, Paris, Plon, 2007.
- Les Évangiles apocryphes, revised ed., Paris, Presses de la Renaissance, 2016.

== Conference proceedings ==
- The Gospel of Judas in Context, Proceedings of the First Conference on the Gospel of Judas held in Paris Sorbonne, 27th-28th October 2006, Edited by M. Scopello, « Nag Hammadi and Manichaean Studies » LXII, Leiden, Brill, 2008 ISBN 9789047442851)
- Gnosis and Revelation. Ten Studies on Codex Tchacos, Edited by M. Scopello, Florence, Leo Olschki, 2009 (= Rivista di Storia e Letteratura Religiosa 46 (2008)/3).
- Les textes de Nag Hammadi: Histoire des religions et approches contemporaines. Actes du Colloque international tenu à l’Académie des Inscriptions et Belles-Lettres, 11-12 décembre 2008, J.P. Mahé, P.-H. Poirier, M. Scopello éds., Paris, AIBL-Diffusion De Boccard, 2010.
- ‘In Search of Truth’: Augustine, Manichaeism and Other Gnosticism. Studies for Johannes van Oort at Sixty, Edited by J.A. van den Berg, A. Kotzé, T. Nicklas and M. Scopello, « Nag Hammadi and Manichaean Studies » LXXIV, Leiden, Brill, 2011.
- Les forces du bien et du mal dans les premiers siècles de l’Église, Actes du Colloque Patristique IV, Université de Tours, 11-13 septembre 2008, Y.-M. Blanchard, B. Pouderon, M. Scopello éds., Paris, Beauchesne, 2011.
- La mystique théorétique et théurgique dans l’Antiquité gréco-romaine, S. Mimouni et M. Scopello éds., Turnhout, Brepols, 2016.
