= Johannes van Oort =

Dutch academic

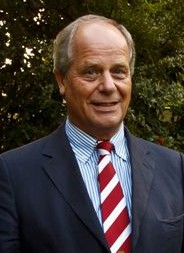
Prof. Johannes van Oort

Johannes (Hans) van Oort (born 4 September 1949) is a Dutch academic who is the Professor of Patristics and Gnostic Studies at Radboud University, Nijmegen, and at the University of Pretoria, South Africa. He is best known for his specialty in the study of St. Augustine, the gnostic world religion of Mani (Manicheism), and the Gospel of Judas. In 2006 van Oort presented, with the National Geographic Society, the discovery of this gnostic “gospel” to the Dutch speaking world.

== Biography ==
Van Oort studied Latin and Greek, and subsequently theology, at the University of Utrecht. He received his Doctorate with highest distinction for the thesis Jeruzalem en Babylon: Een onderzoek van Augustinus’ De stad van God en de bronnen van zijn leer van de twee steden (rijken)(1986), a thesis that saw its fourth Dutch edition published in 1995. The English edition was published in 1991 as Jerusalem and Babylon: A Study of Augustine’s City of God and the Sources of his Doctrine of the Two Cities and was reprinted in paperback by Brill Academic Publishers, Leiden-Boston in 2013.

Van Oort has been involved in higher education since 1972, from 1980-1983 as scientific associate in Church History at Utrecht University and from 1983-1987 as university lecturer in Religious Pedagogy and Didactics at the same university. During this time, he was also a scientific researcher for the Dutch Research Organization ZWO (now NWO), and editor of an educational review.

In 1987 van Oort was appointed as Senior Research Fellow of the Royal Dutch Academy of Sciences (KNAW) for research into Augustine and the sources of his theology. In 1992, he was appointed as senior lecturer in Church History and History of Christian Doctrine at Utrecht University. In 1999, van Oort was named as extraordinary professor in Gnostic Studies at Nijmegen, where he became ordinary professor in 2000. In the same year, he also became an extra-ordinary professor for Early Christianity and Patristics at the University of Pretoria. In 2009, he became an A-rated fellow of the South African National Research Foundation (NRF). This highest possible rating was again awarded in 2015 and 2020 (for the period 2021-2026).

== Gnostic Studies and Augustine ==
Van Oort’s study of Augustine and the sources for his theology has made him a specialist in Gnostic Studies as well, particularly in the gnostic-Christian world church of Mani (216-276/7). He has served as member of the Board of the International Association of Manichaean Studies (IAMS), first as its Secretary (1993-2001) and subsequently as its President (2001-2009). In this capacity he was one of the scholars who took initiative to publish the many Manichaean sources that were at the time scattered throughout the world, in the Corpus Fontium Manichaeorum, a project that gained wide support among academies of science and UNESCO. In 2010 Professor van Oort was elected an honorary member of the IAMS.

Van Oort is member of diverse international organisations and academies of science, and was a visiting professor at Oxford University, University of London and Warwick University in service to the British Academy from 1998-1999.

Van Oort has published 25 monographs, mainly on the topics of Augustine and the gnostic world church of Mani. A selected bibliography has appeared in a 2011 Festschrift of 800 pages: In Search of Truth: Augustine, Manichaeism and other Gnosticism: Studies for Johannes van Oort at Sixty (Leiden-Boston: Brill, 2011; reprinted in 2017).

Currently, van Oort serves as managing editor of Brill’s Nag Hammadi and Manichaean Studies, as co-editor (and book review editor) of the patristic journal Vigiliae Christianae: A Review of Early Christian Life and Language, as co-editor of the Corpus Fontium Manichaeorum (Brepols, Turnhout), and as co-editor of the series Studies of the [German] Patristic Association / Studien der Patristischen Arbeitsgemeinschaft (Peeters, Leuven).

van Oort's translation in poetic verse of fragments from Augustine's Confessions (Bij God lééft ons goed: Bidden met Augustinus [Leiden: Groen, 1993; Heerenveen: Royal Jongbloed 2021]) has been put to music by the Utrecht composer Theo Teunissen, and has been performed by associates of the Utrecht Convervatorium. The church musician Leo Köhlenberg has reworked Van Oort’s translation of the Gospel of Judas as the Oratorium Iskarioth.

Van Oort’s most recent publications has been his edited volume, Augustine and Manichaean Christianity. Selected Papers from the First South African Conference on Augustine of Hippo, University of Pretoria, 24–26 April 2012 (Nag Hammadi and Manichaean Studies 83; Leiden-Boston: Brill, 2013); his first volume of collected essays " Mani and Augustine " (Nag Hammadi and Manichaean Studies 97; Leiden-Boston: Brill, 2020), and his edited volume "Manichaeism and Early Christianity. Selected Papers from the 2019 Pretoria Congress and Consultation" (Nag Hammadi and Manichaean Studies 99; Leiden-Boston: Brill 2021).
