= Kephalaia =

Manichaean literature

Information
- Religion: Manichaeism
- Language: Coptic
- Period: c. 5th century

Kephalaia (Koine Greek and Coptic: ⲕⲉⲫⲁⲗⲁⲓⲁ, lit. 'chapters, headings') is a genre of Manichaean literature represented mainly by two large papyrus codices containing Coptic translations from 5th-century Roman Egypt. The kephalaia are sometimes seen as the actual words or teachings of the prophet Mani, but are probably better viewed as later discourses and interpretations laid upon "an authoritative oral tradition" ostensibly going back to Mani and thus analogous to the Talmud in Judaism and the ḥadīth in Islam.

Although the Kephalaia likely originated, like hadiths, as accounts of the life and actions of Mani, the utility of the genre was such that it came to incorporate a wide variety of literary styles subjected artificially to the constraints of the format: instruction, exegesis, narrative, dialogue, parable, miracle-story, and even epic traditions.

The discovery of the Kephalaia has been revolutionary in transforming scholarship on early Manichaean traditions and even the secular history of the Sasanian Empire.

Despite the apocryphal and heavily reworked nature of the available text, most prominently from Coptic translation, it is an authentic representation of traditions first held and developed by the Manichaean communities in the early Sasanian period within the empire. As such, this is a unique source for literature, religion and society from a known context that substantially pre-dates most other available resources concerning the reigns of Shapur II and his successors.

While Jesus is only rarely called Jesus the Splendour in other Manichaen writings, he is commonly called as such in the Kephalaia of the Teacher. In the Kephalaia, Jesus is an emanation of the Father of Greatness and identical with the "Third Envoy" and the "living word," brought forth to restore the damage done by the rebellion of the Archons. When Jesus the Splendour descends to the earth, he later takes on the shape of flesh to manifest himself in the material world.

The descriptions of the Lord of Darkness in chapters 6 and 27 of the Kephalaia have close parallels in chapter 12.6 of the Mandaean Right Ginza.

== Bibliography ==
- Funk, Wolf-Peter (1997). "The Reconstruction of the Manichaean Kephalaia". In Paul Mirecki; Jason BeDuhn (eds.). Emerging from Darkness: Studies in the Recovery of Manichaean Sources. Nag Hammadi and Manichaean Studies. Vol. 43. Brill. pp. 143–159.
- Gardner, Iain (1995). The Kephalaia of the Teacher The Edited Coptic Manichaean Texts in Translation with Commentary. Boston: BRILL. ISBN 978-90-04-32891-4. OCLC 1202467897.
- Gardner, Iain (2015). Mani at the court of the Persian kings: studies on the Chester Beatty Kephalaia Codex. Leiden, Netherlands: Brill. ISBN 978-90-04-28262-9. OCLC 961532862.
- Gardner, Iain (2018). "Kephalaia". Encyclopædia Iranica (online ed.). Encyclopædia Iranica Foundation.
- Gardner, Iain; BeDuhn, Jason; Dilley, Paul C., eds. (2018). The Kephalaia Codex: The Chapters of the Wisdom of My Lord Mani, Part III: Pages 343–442 (Chapters 321–347). Nag Hammadi and Manichaean Studies. Vol. 92. Brill. ISBN 978-90-04-36340-3. OCLC 1043913619.
- Pettipiece, Timothy (2009). Pentadic redaction in the Manichaean Kephalaia. Nag Hammadi and Manichaean Studies. Vol. 66. Leiden: Brill. ISBN 978-90-474-2782-7. OCLC 570278329.
- Pettipiece, Timothy (2013). "Coptic Answers to Manichaean Questions: The Erotapokritic Nature of the Kephalaia". La littérature des questions et réponses dans l'antiquité profane et chrétienne: De l'enseignement à l'exégèse. Actes du séminaire sur le genre des questions et réponses tenu à Ottawa les 27 et 28 septembre 2009. Instrumenta Patristica et Mediaevalia. Vol. 64. Brepols. pp. 51–61. doi:10.1484/M.IPM-EB.6.09070802050003050406080605. ISBN 978-2-503-54686-5.
