= John D. Turner =

American historian and theologian (1938–2019)

- Born: July 15, 1938; Glenridge, New Jersey U.S.
- Died: October 26, 2019 (aged 81); Lincoln, Nebraska, U.S.

Academic background
- Education: Dartmouth College; Union Presbyterian Seminary; Duke University

Academic work
- Discipline: History and classics Religious studies
- Institutions: University of Nebraska

John D. Turner (15 July 1938 in Glen Ridge - 26 October 2019) was the Cotner Professor of Religious Studies and Charles J. Mach University Professor of Classics and History Classics & Religious Studies at the University of Nebraska. He was well known for his translations of the Nag Hammadi library.

== Life ==
After graduating from Dartmouth College in 1960, Turner served a stint in the Army, then worked as an actuary and a car salesman before entering the Union Theological Seminary in Virginia, seeking to become a Presbyterian minister. Although he earned a master's degree in theology in 1966, he decided against the ministry and instead entered Duke University's religious program, seeking a doctorate in early Christianity. While at Duke, he joined a team of about 20 young American scholars assembled by James M. Robinson to edit and translate the Nag Hammadi library.

His expertise was in Biblical studies, New Testament, Hellenistic and Graeco-Roman religion and philosophy, Gnosticism, later Platonism and Neoplatonism, Coptic language and literature. He had expertise in the study of ancient Gnosticism, in particular the restoration, conservation, translation, and interpretation of the thirteen fourth-century papyrus codices from Nag Hammadi.

Turner had contributed to research into the relationship between Neoplatonism and Gnosticism, including a study of the use of terms and concepts by the author or authors of the Sethian Allogenes text.

== Education ==
- B.D., Th.M., Union Theological Seminary in Virginia, 1966
- Ph.D. with Highest Distinction, Duke University (Religion), 1970

== Works ==
- The Book of Thomas the Contender from Codex II of the Cairo Gnostic Library from Nag Hammadi (CG II,7). Missoula 1975, ISBN 0-89130-017-1.
- with Anne McGuire: The Nag Hammadi Library after fifty years. Proceedings of the 1995 Society of Biblical Literature commemoration. Leiden 1997, ISBN 90-04-10824-6.
- Sethian gnosticism and the Platonic tradition. Québec 2001, ISBN 2-7637-7834-8.
- with Liv Ingeborg Lied and Christian H. Bull: Mystery and secrecy in the Nag Hammadi collection and other ancient literature. Ideas and practices. Studies for Einar Thomassen at sixty. Leiden 2012, ISBN 978-90-04-21207-7.

== Commemorative publications ==
- Corrigan, Kevin; Rasimus, Tuomas, eds. (2013). Gnosticism, Platonism and the late ancient world: essays in honour of John D. Turner. Leiden: Brill. ISBN 978-90-04-25476-3. OCLC 857800490.

== See also ==
- Plato
- Plotinus
- Neoplatonism
