= Nag Hammadi Codex XIII =

Nag Hammadi Codex XIII (designated by siglum NHC XIII) is a papyrus codex with a collection of early Christian Gnostic texts in Coptic (Sahidic dialect). The manuscript is generally dated to the 4th century, though there is some debate regarding the original composition of the texts.

== Description ==
The manuscript was written on papyrus in the form of a codex. It is written in Sahidic dialect. The codex contains: Trimorphic Protennoia and On the Origin of the World. It is the only surviving copy of the Trimorphic Protennoia.

The text is written in uncial letters. It is well written in an informal book hand. There is no punctuation, no division between sayings. The nomina sacra are contracted in an unusual way (Π̅Ν̅Α̅, Χ̅Σ̅, Χ̅Ρ̅Σ̅, Ι̅Η̅Σ̅), the words at the end of line are abbreviated. The scribe is identical with the scribe A of Codex II. The scribe employed several styles. The scribe made several errors of haplography (omitted letter N in 38.7; 48.28; omitted OY 40.18; omitted T in 48.15) and dittography (42.26; 45.31).

The so-called "Codex XIII" is in fact not a codex, but rather the text of Trimorphic Protennoia, written on "... eight leaves removed from a thirteenth book in late antiquity and tucked inside the front cover of the sixth." Only a few lines from the beginning of Origin of the World are discernible on the bottom of the eighth leaf.

It was buried with the other Nag Hammadi codices, where it lay until the day of its discovery in 1945.

On June 8, 1952, the Coptic Museum received the codex. The text of the codex was edited by Gesine Schenke. It was examined and described by James J. Robinson in 1979. Currently the manuscript is housed at the Department of manuscripts of the Coptic Museum (Inv. 10545) in Cairo.

== See also ==
Coptic manuscripts

- British Library Or 4926
- Nag Hammadi Codex II

Greek manuscripts

- Papyrus Oxyrhynchus 1
- Papyrus Oxyrhynchus 654
- Papyrus Oxyrhynchus 655
