= Nag Hammadi Codex II =

Coptic papyrus codex

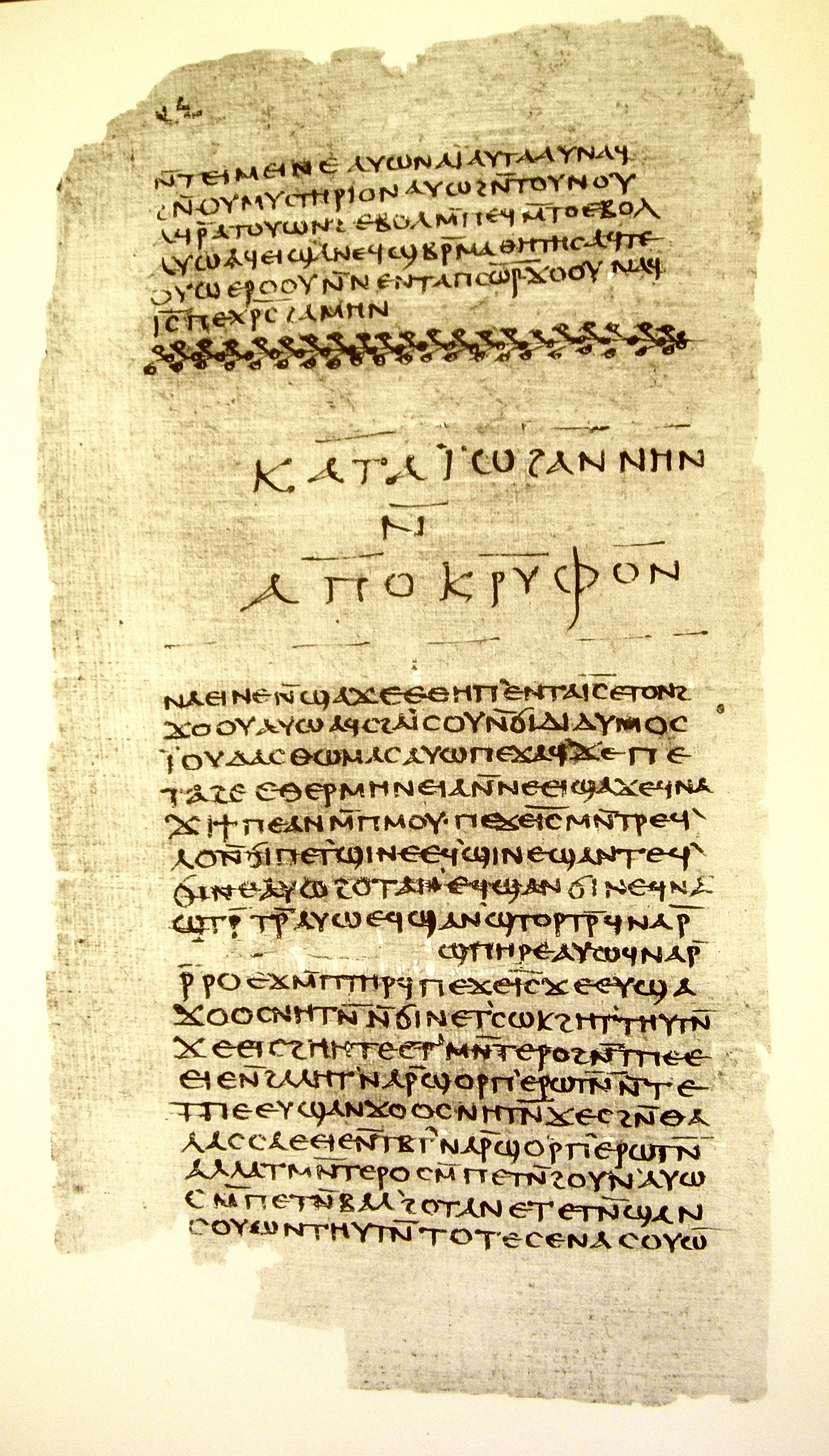
NHC II, the end of the Apocryphon of John, the beginning of the Gospel of Thomas

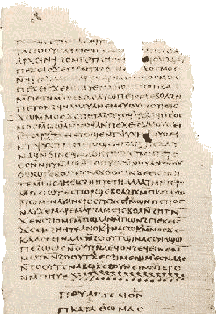
NHC II, the end of the Gospel of Thomas

Nag Hammadi Codex II (designated by siglum CG II) is a papyrus codex with a collection of early Christian Gnostic texts in Coptic (Sahidic dialect). The manuscript has survived in nearly perfect condition. The codex is dated to the 4th century. It is the only complete manuscript from antiquity with the text of the Gospel of Thomas.

== Description ==
The manuscript was written on papyrus in the form of a codex. The measurements of the leaves are 254 mm by 158 mm. Originally the codex contained 76 unnumbered leaves, now 74 leaves. It is written in Sahidic dialect. Pages A–B are blank. The codex contains:

- The Apocryphon of John
- The Gospel of Thomas, a sayings gospel, pages C–D blank
- The Gospel of Philip
- The Hypostasis of the Archons
- On the Origin of the World
- The Exegesis on the Soul
- The Book of Thomas the Contender.

The text is written in uncial letters. It is well written in an informal book hand. There is no punctuation, no division between sayings. The nomina sacra are contracted in a usual way, the words at the end of each line are abbreviated and it uses ligatures, including staurograms.

The manuscript was written by two scribes (A and B). Scribe B copied only the first 8 lines of page 47 and is not otherwise represented in the Nag Hammadi collection. Scribe A copied all leaves except the 8 lines on page 47, employed several styles, and left some blank pages because the text from which he copied was imperfect or illegible (probably). Scribe A is identical with the scribe of Codex XIII.

It was discovered in 1945 at Nag Hammadi. It was first published in a photographic edition in 1956. The leaves of the codex were separated in 1957 and rejoined in 1974–1975.

On June 8, 1952 the Coptic Museum received the codex. Currently the manuscript is housed at the Department of manuscripts of the Coptic Museum (Inv. 10544) in Cairo.

== See also ==
Coptic manuscripts

- British Library Or 4926
- Nag Hammadi Codex XIII
- Nag Hammadi Library

Greek manuscripts

- Papyrus Oxyrhynchus 1
- Papyrus Oxyrhynchus 654
- Papyrus Oxyrhynchus 655
