= British Library Or 4926 =

British Library Or 4926 (1), known also as P. Lond. Copt. 522 (Crum), is a papyrus codex with a collection of early Christian Gnostic texts in Coptic (sub-Akhmimic dialect). The manuscript has survived in a fragmentary condition. The codex is dated to the 4th century. Erroneously it is known also as British Library Or 4920 (1).

== Description ==
The manuscript was written on papyrus in the form of a codex. The text was written in one column per page. 24 fragments of it survived, however most of them are illegible. The measurements of the biggest fragment are 2.5 by 3.5 inches. It was later identified as a manuscript of the Gospel of Thomas (tractate 5).

It was examined by Frederic G. Kenyon and Walter Ewing Crum in 1905. According to Crum the dialect is a mixture of Akhmimic and Sahidic forms. Bentley Layton examined it twice, in 1978 and 1980. Currently the manuscript is housed at the British Library (Or. 4926) in London.

== See also ==
Coptic manuscripts

- Nag Hammadi Codex II
- Nag Hammadi Codex XIII

Greek manuscripts

- Papyrus Oxyrhynchus 1
- Papyrus Oxyrhynchus 654
- Papyrus Oxyrhynchus 655
