= Chocimska Street, Bydgoszcz =

Street, Bydgoszcz, Poland, 19th–20th century

Coordinates: 53°08′07″N 18°00′36″E

Chocimska Street in Bydgoszcz
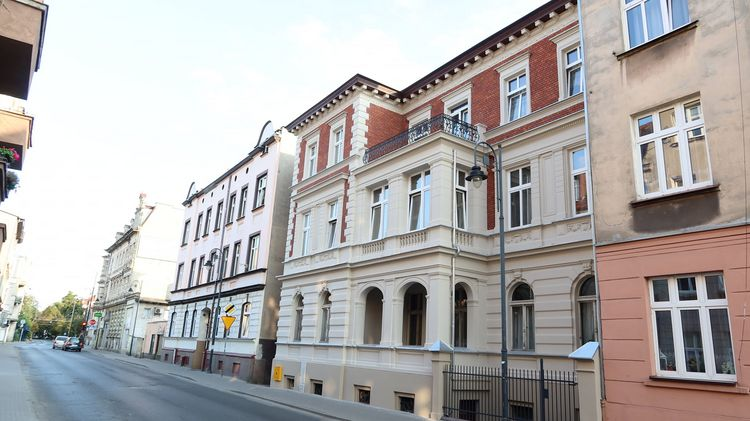
- View of the street

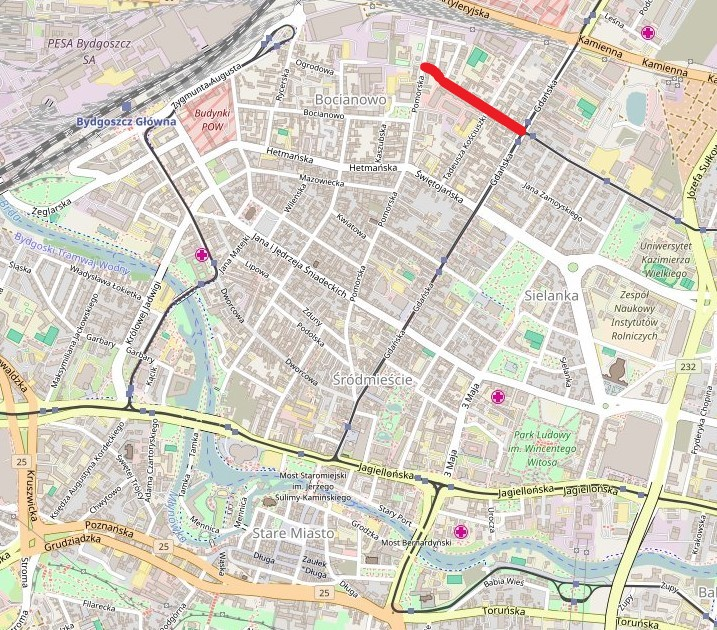
- Chocimska street highlighted on a map
- Native name: Ulica Chocimska w Bydgoszczy (Polish)
- Former name: Sedan straße
- Part of: Śródmieście district
- Namesake: City of Khotyn
- Owner: City of Bydgoszcz
- Length: 400 m (1,300 ft)
- Width: ca. 10m
- Location: Bydgoszcz, Poland

Construction
- Construction start: 1880

Chocimska Street is a historical street of downtown Bydgoszcz, Poland.

== Location ==
The street is located in the district of Bocianowo, in the north of the city center. Running on a southeast–northwest axis, it mirrors Jana Karola Chodkiewicza street on the western side of Gdańska Street. On its path, it crosses Kościuszki street before ending to the west on Pomorska street.

== History ==
In the 19th century, the area to the north of the city of Bromberg was devoted to farming. One of them, a folwark, was called Bocianowo. It gave its name to the district where is located Chocimska Street.

The first reference of the path goes back to 1880: this year, the address book of Bromberg mentions the street under the naming Sedan Straße. At that time, only ten plots had been built. Most of the constructions happened in two decades, from 1890 to 1910.

Until the outset of WWII, Chocimska street was ending to the west at the barracks. The latter had been built in the 1870s, then used by the Prussian "14th (3rd Pomeranian) Infantry Regiment "Count Schwerin" " infantry and later billeted the Polish "61st Infantry Regiment" till the 1930s.

During the occupation, Chocimska street (then anew "Sedan straße") was extended through the ancient barracks (see "Londynek" below) to reach Pomorska street (renamed at the time "Robert Ley straße").

Apart from the isolated renovations that are occurring regularly, a project of tram line is being studied, connecting the main train station to the main axis, Gdańska street, through Chocimska street. Consultations have been launched among the population by the city authorities at the end of 2021.

=== Naming ===
During its existence, the street bore the following names:

- From 1880 till 1920, Sedanstraße, in reference to the Battle of Sedan won by the Prussian forces during the Franco-Prussian War in September 1870;
- 1920–1939, Ulica Chocimska;
- 1939–1945, Sedanstraße;
- Since 1945, Ulica Chocimska.

The current naming refers to the city of Khotyn (Polish: Chocim), today in Ukraine.

Khotyn/Chocim has been under Lithuanian-Polish domination from 1432 to 1699 (discontinuously). The place has been the site of two important battles against the Ottoman Empire in 1621 and 1673.

== Main edifices ==
=== Reinhold Zschiesche Tenement at 1, corner with Gdańska Street ===
1885–1886, by Józef Święcicki and Anton Hoffmann

Eclecticism

Reinhold Zschiesche was a restaurateur who ran his business on the ground floor.

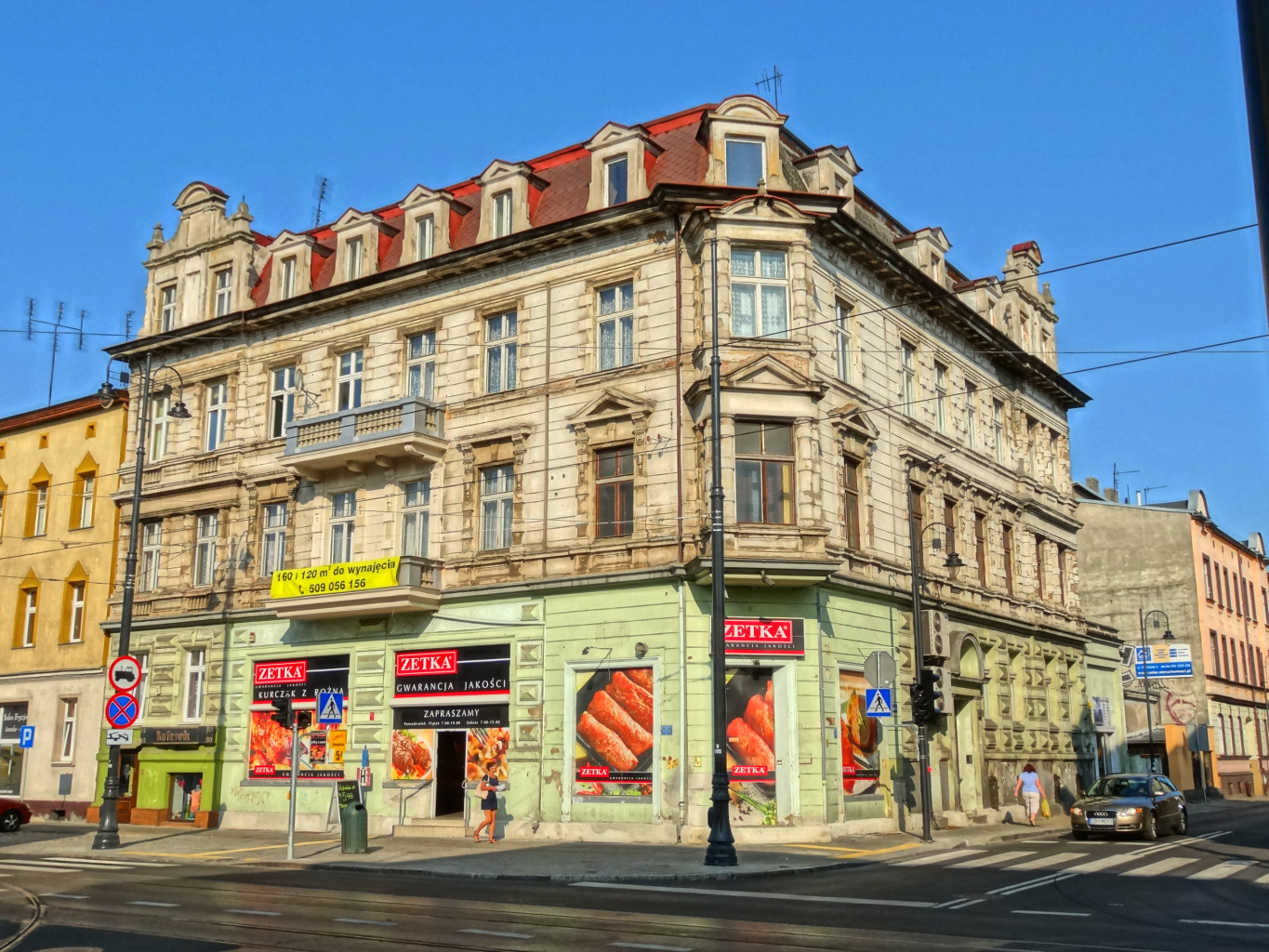
View of the corner

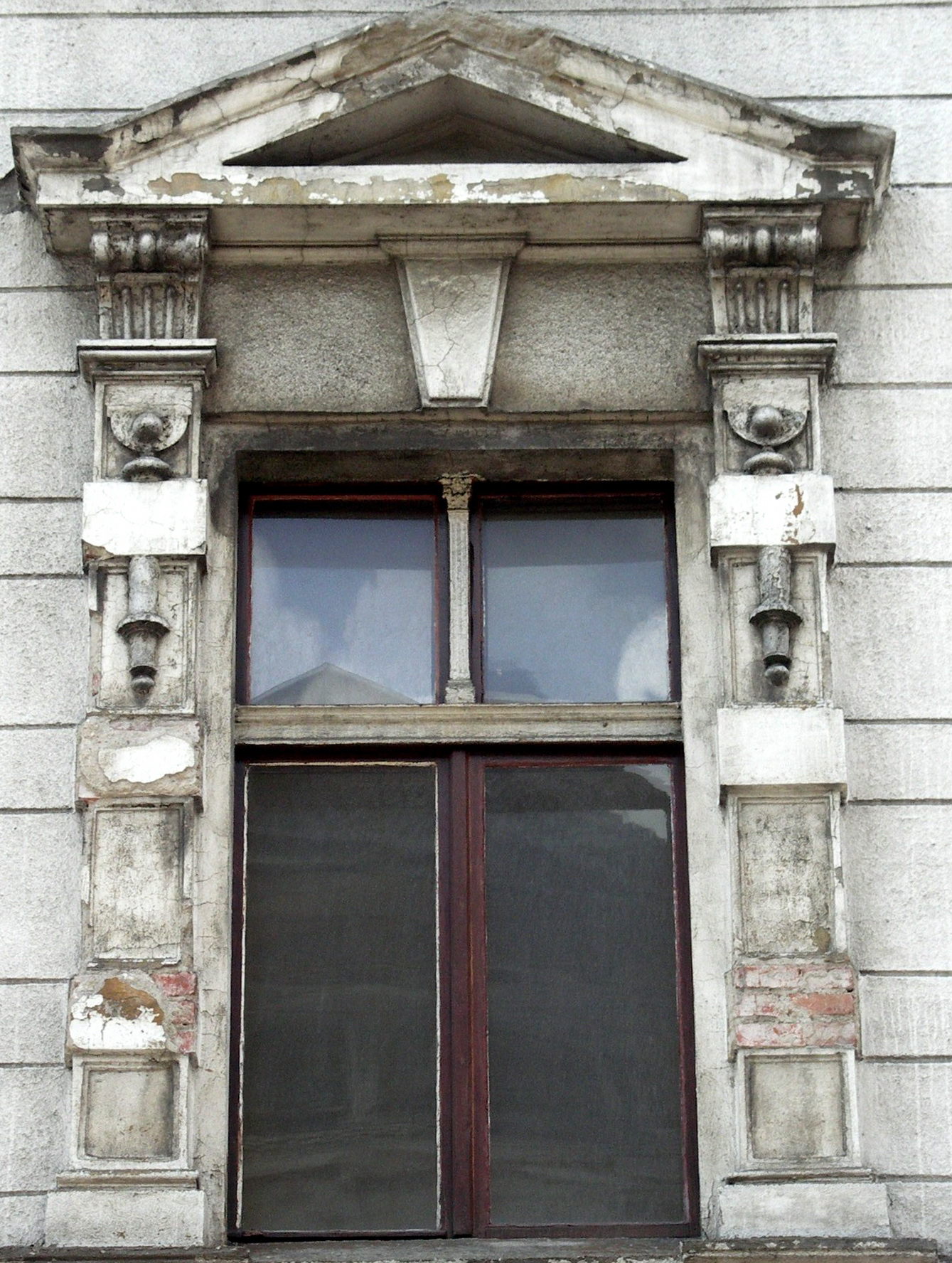
Window adornments

=== Rudolf Gehrke tenement, at 113 Gdańska Street ===
1886, by Józef Święcicki and Anton Hoffmann

Eclecticism & Neo-Renaissance.

The first owner was Reinhold Zschiesche, also owner of 1 Chocimska Street. In the eclectic decoration, Józef Święcicki used Neo-Renaissance details.

The entrance from Gdańska Street is topped with a head figure in a cartouche. The tenement has been renovated in 2021.

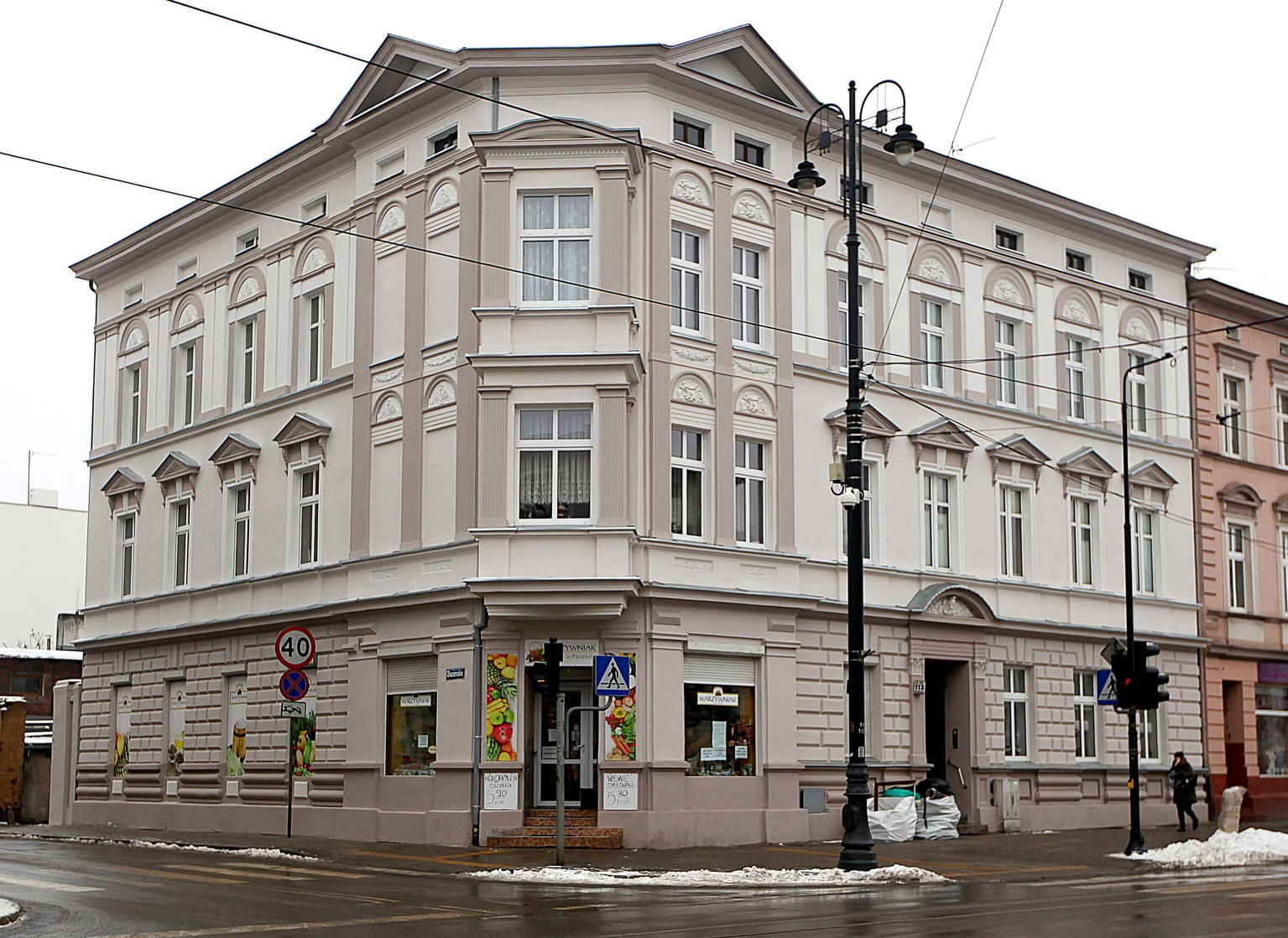
Renovated facade

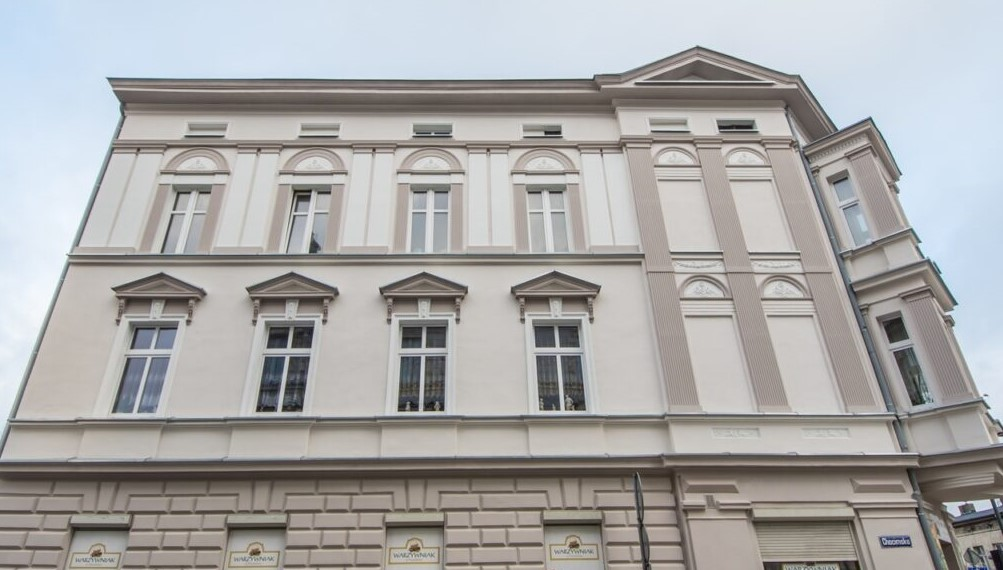
Elevation on Chocimska street

=== Tenement at 3 ===
1903

Eclecticism

Theofil Krüger, a rentier, was the first landlord of this building then at 1a Sedan straße.

The facade reveals few details: bossage on the ground level and a large transom light above the main entrance.

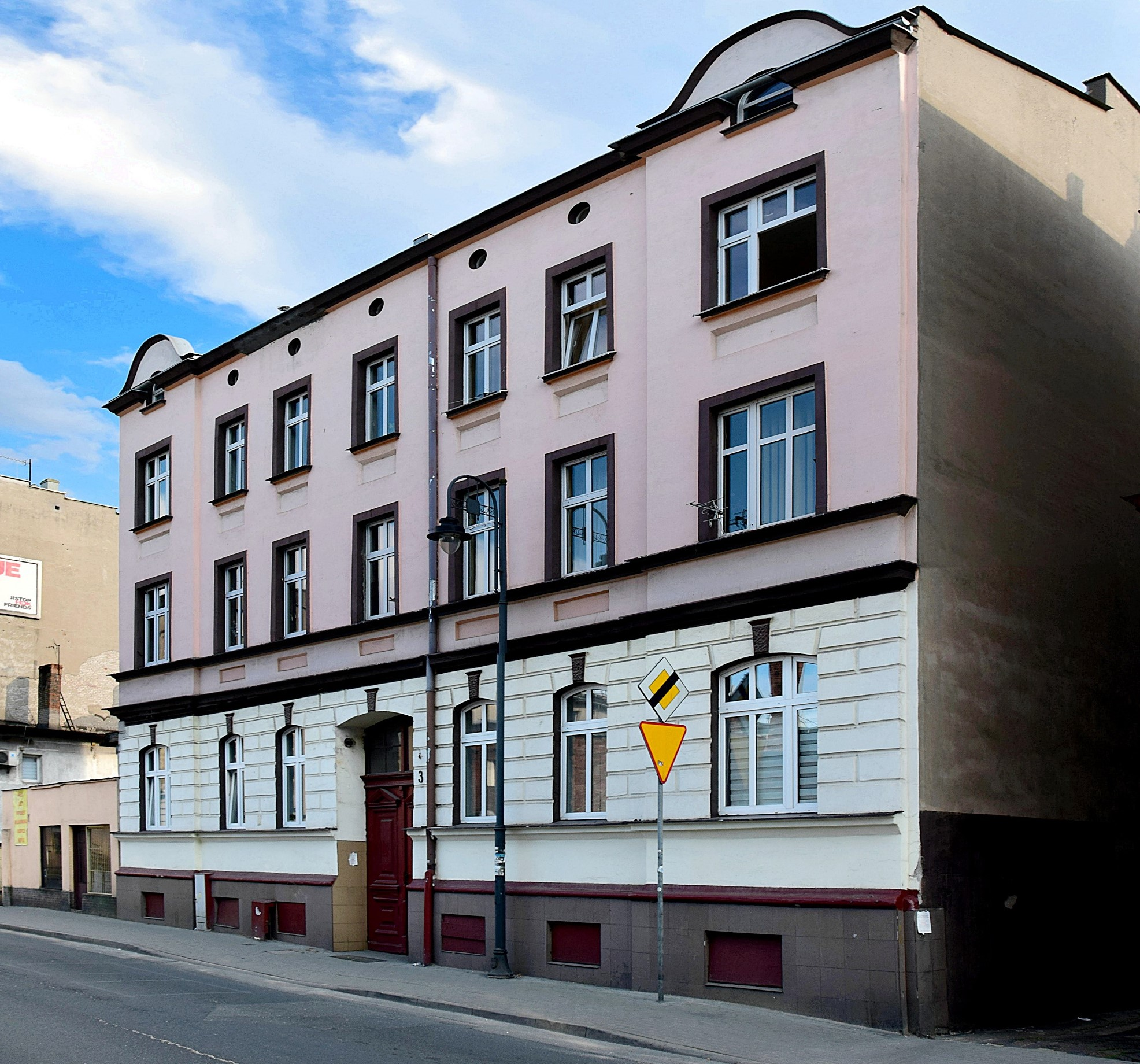
Main elevation

=== Tenement at 5 ===
1891–1892, by Józef Święcicki

Eclecticism

The first owner was Tilk Heinrich, a rentier.

Refurbished in 2021, the building displays a mix of stuccoed elements (bossage, cartouches) and plain bricks. One can notice the ground floor logia topped two level up by a terrace. The eaves are adorned with corbel tables. Such structure recalls a similar building at 31 Sienkiewicza street.

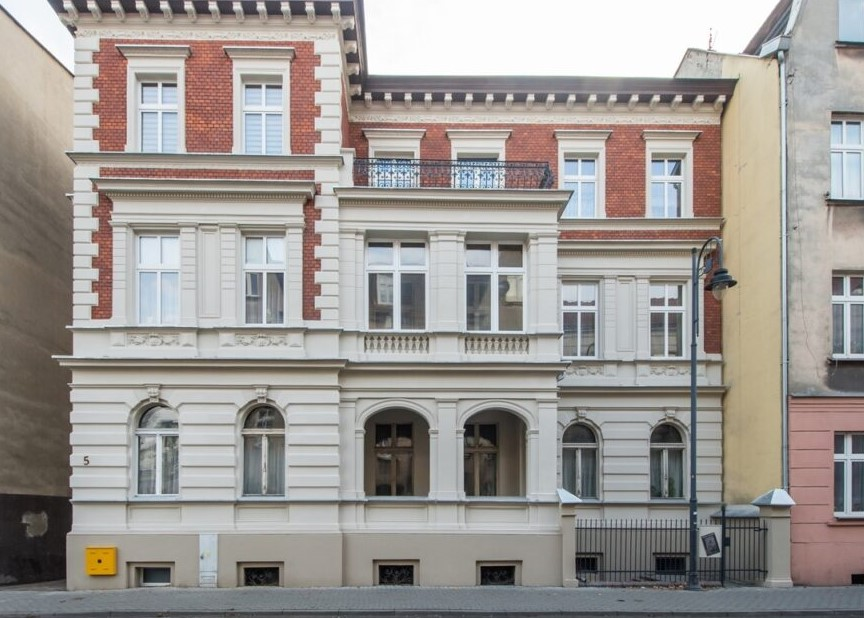
Facade onto the street

=== Tenement at 7 ===
1910, by Walter Zagerman

Early Art Nouveau

The initial landlord was Luise ßotraßki, a widow of a cab operator.

One can highlight the large Art Nouveau double door and the two ogee-shaped wall gables topping the elevation.

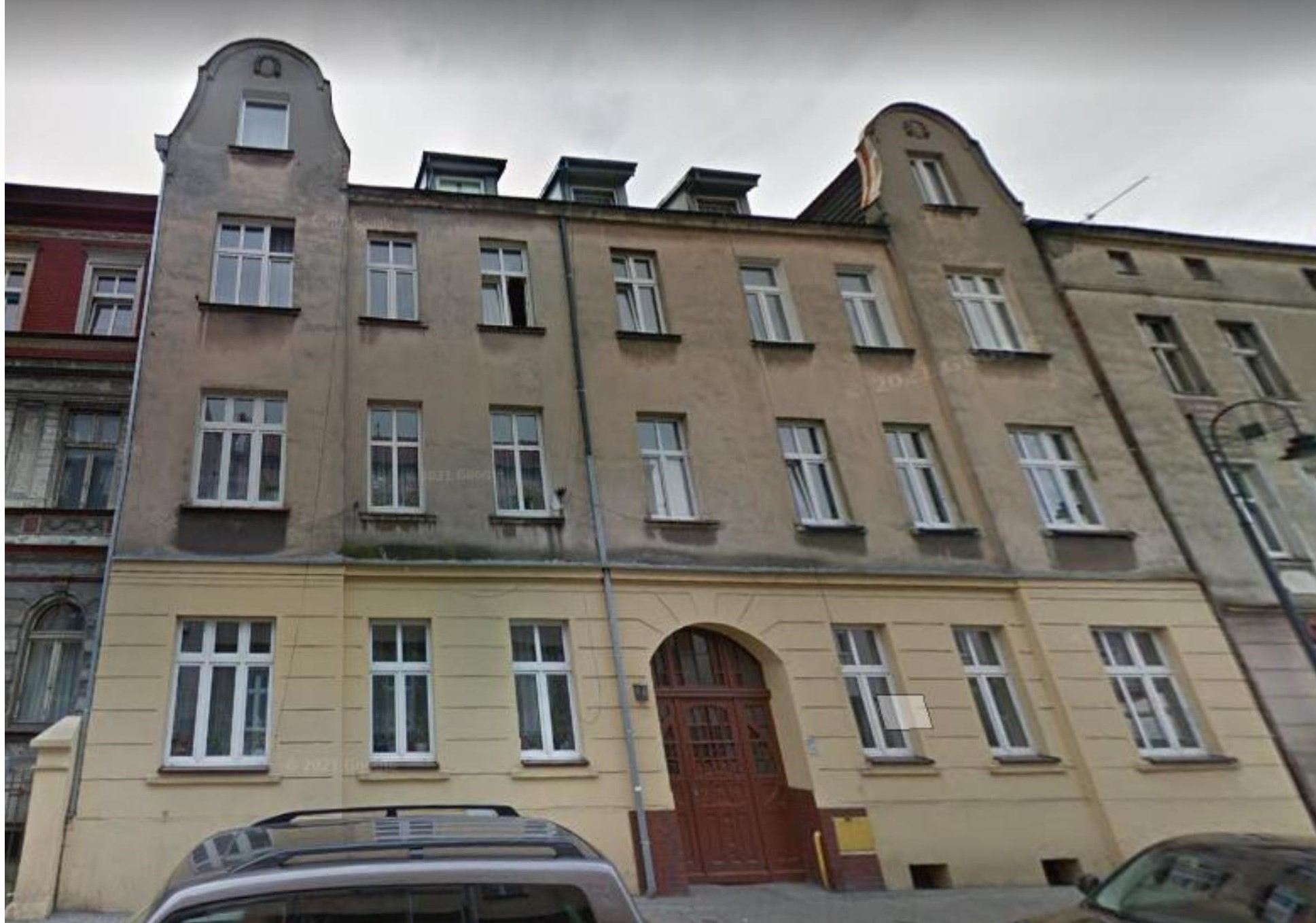
Main elevation

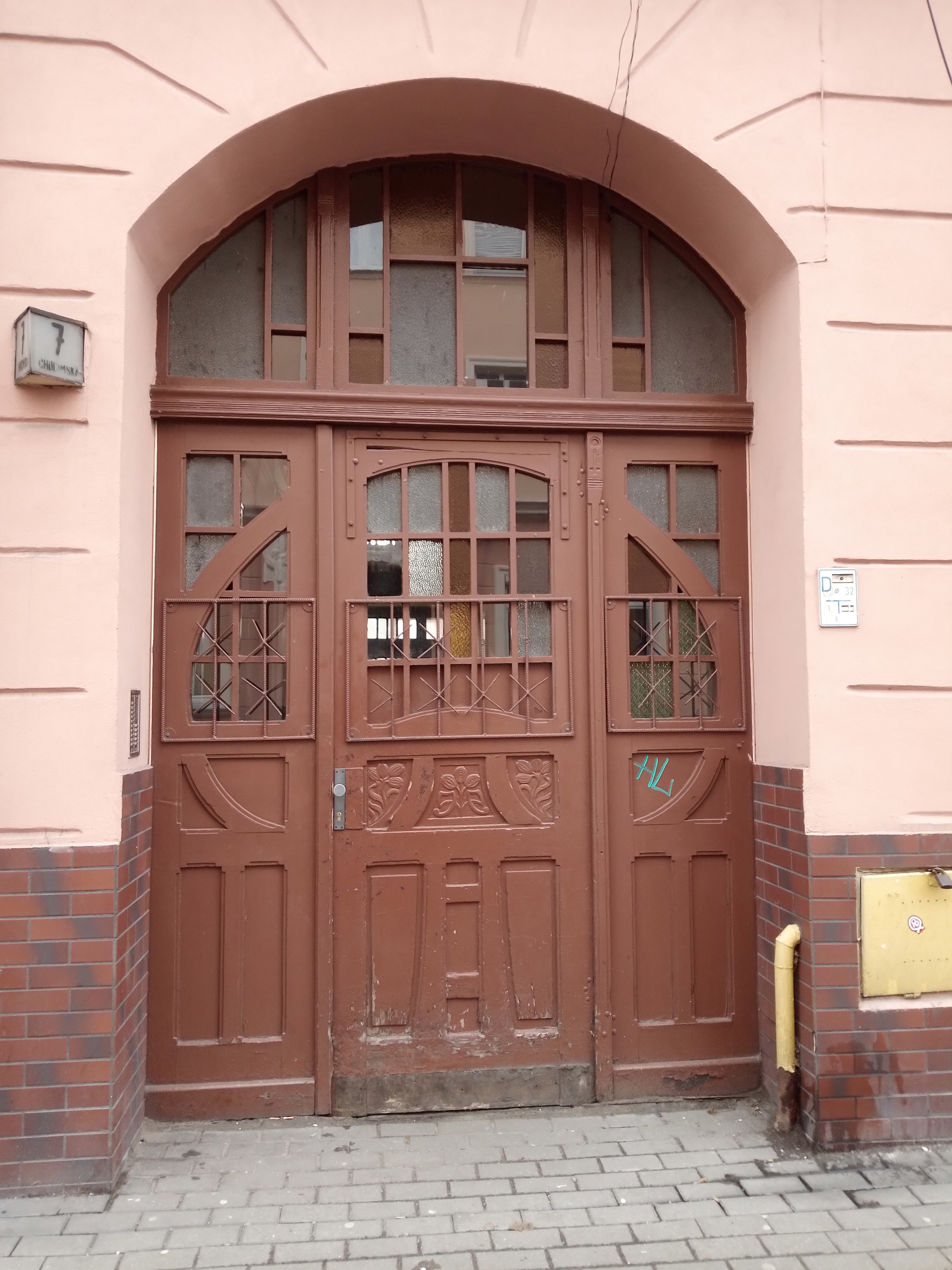
Art Nouveau style door

=== Tenement at 8 ===
1911–1913 by Albert Hohenze

Art Nouveau

Original address was "16 Sedan straße", the owner being Albert Hohensee, a mason.

The main elevation reflects the facade opposite at 7, with an Art Nouveau style entrance door, ogee-shaped wall gables but for additional set of balconies.

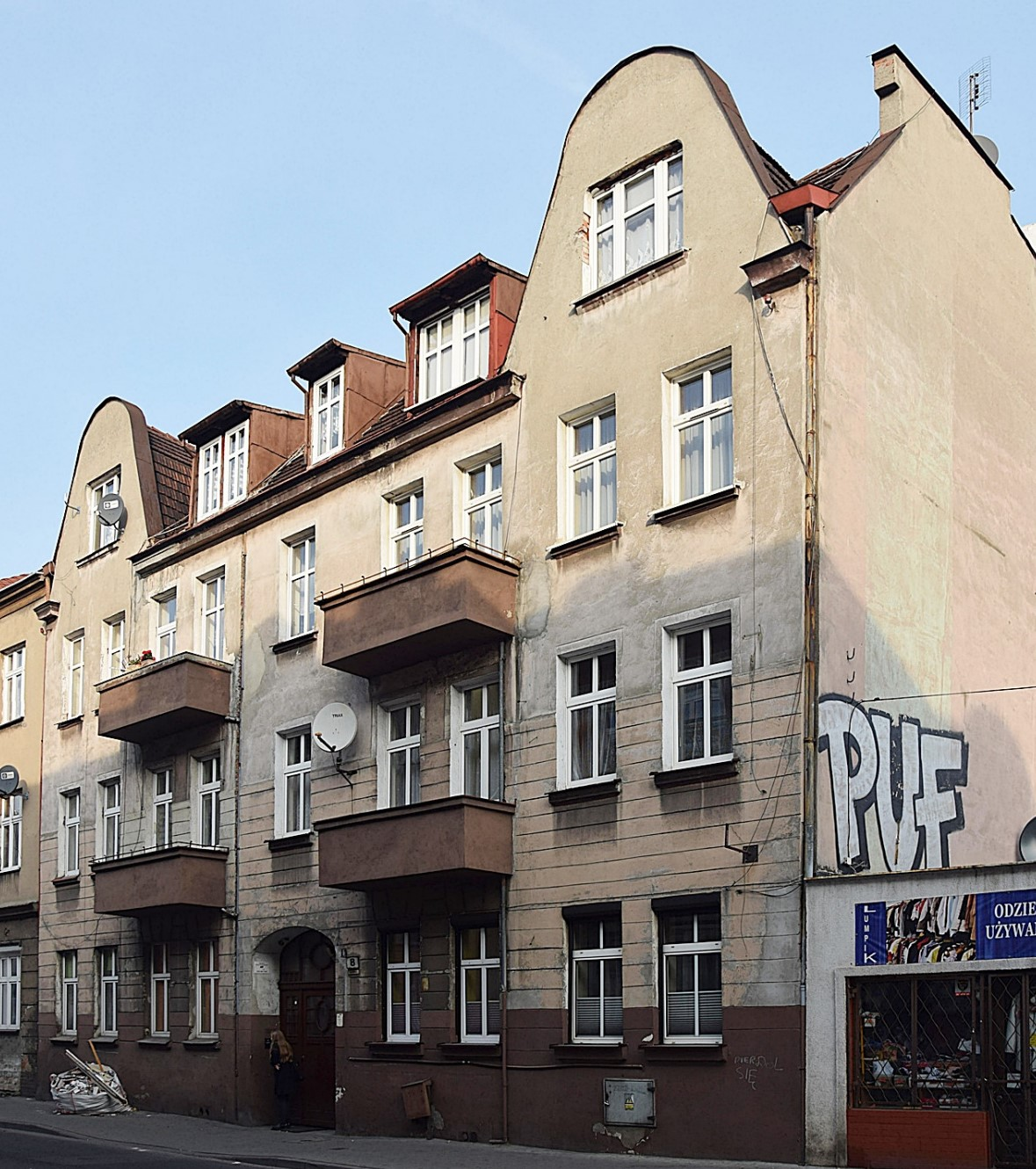
Main elevation

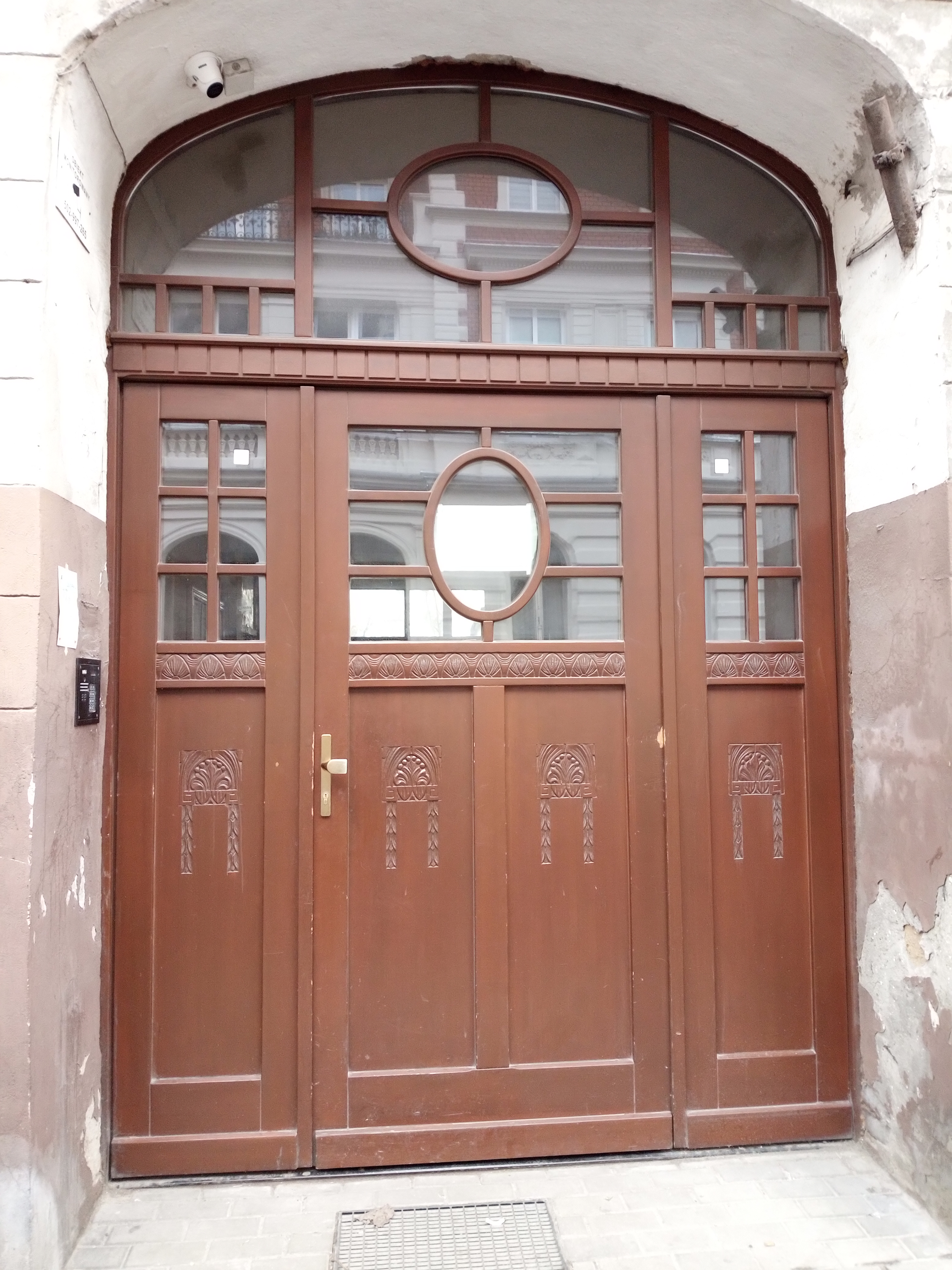
Art Nouveau style door

=== Tenement at 9 ===
Early 1930s

Modern architecture

Built lately in the 1930s, the landlord was Zofja Okońska.

Interesting stuccoed decorations can be seen on the facade, with chequer shapes.

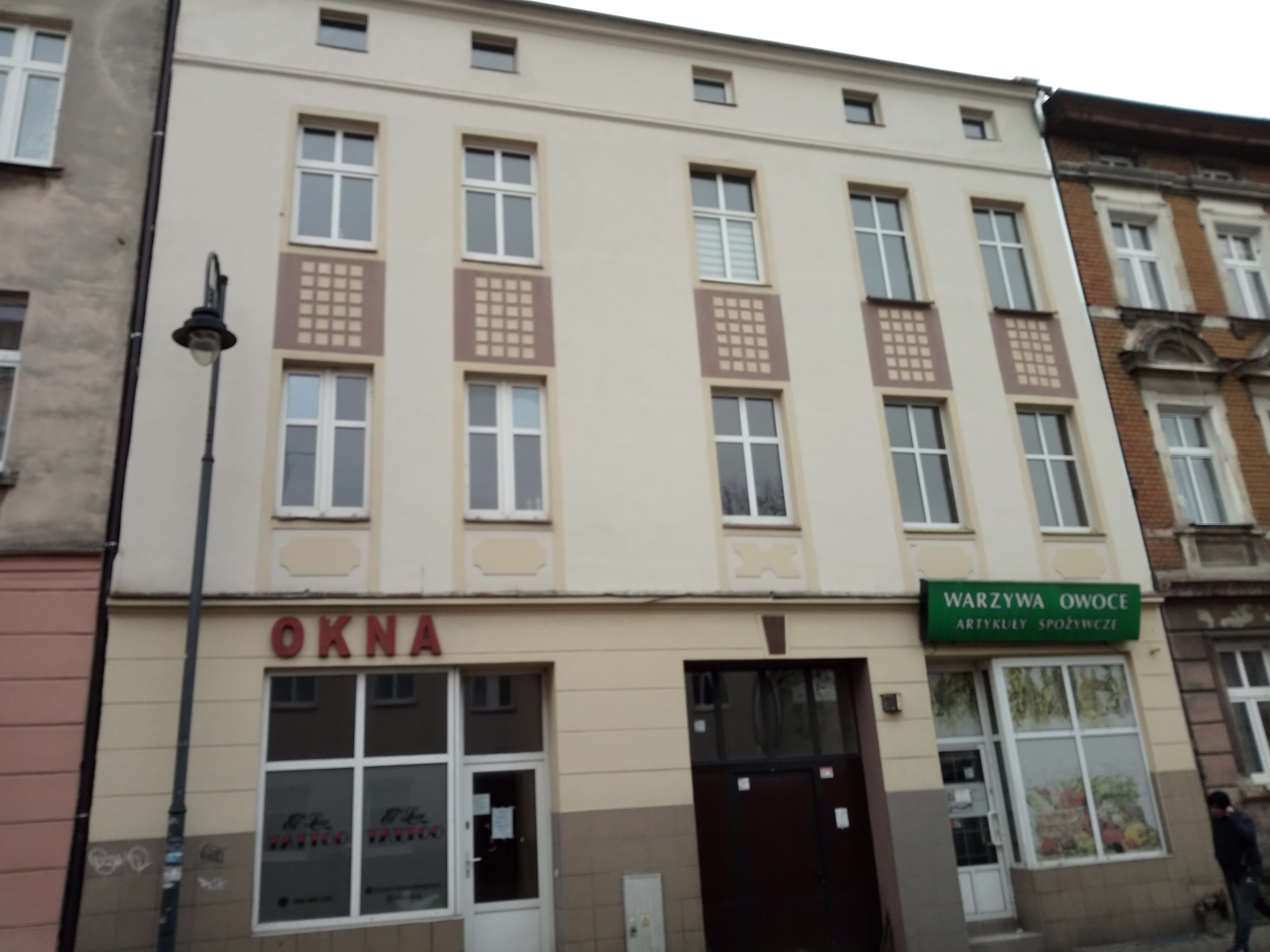
Main frontage

=== Tenement at 10 ===
1907–1909

Late Art Nouveau

Initial owner was Friedrich ßäßnick, a masonry foreman.

The building has been overhauled in 2021. Although most of the facade details have been lost, one can appreciate the preserved portal boasting a lintel with a lion head flanked by eagles and festoons. The wooden door displays late Art Nouveau features.

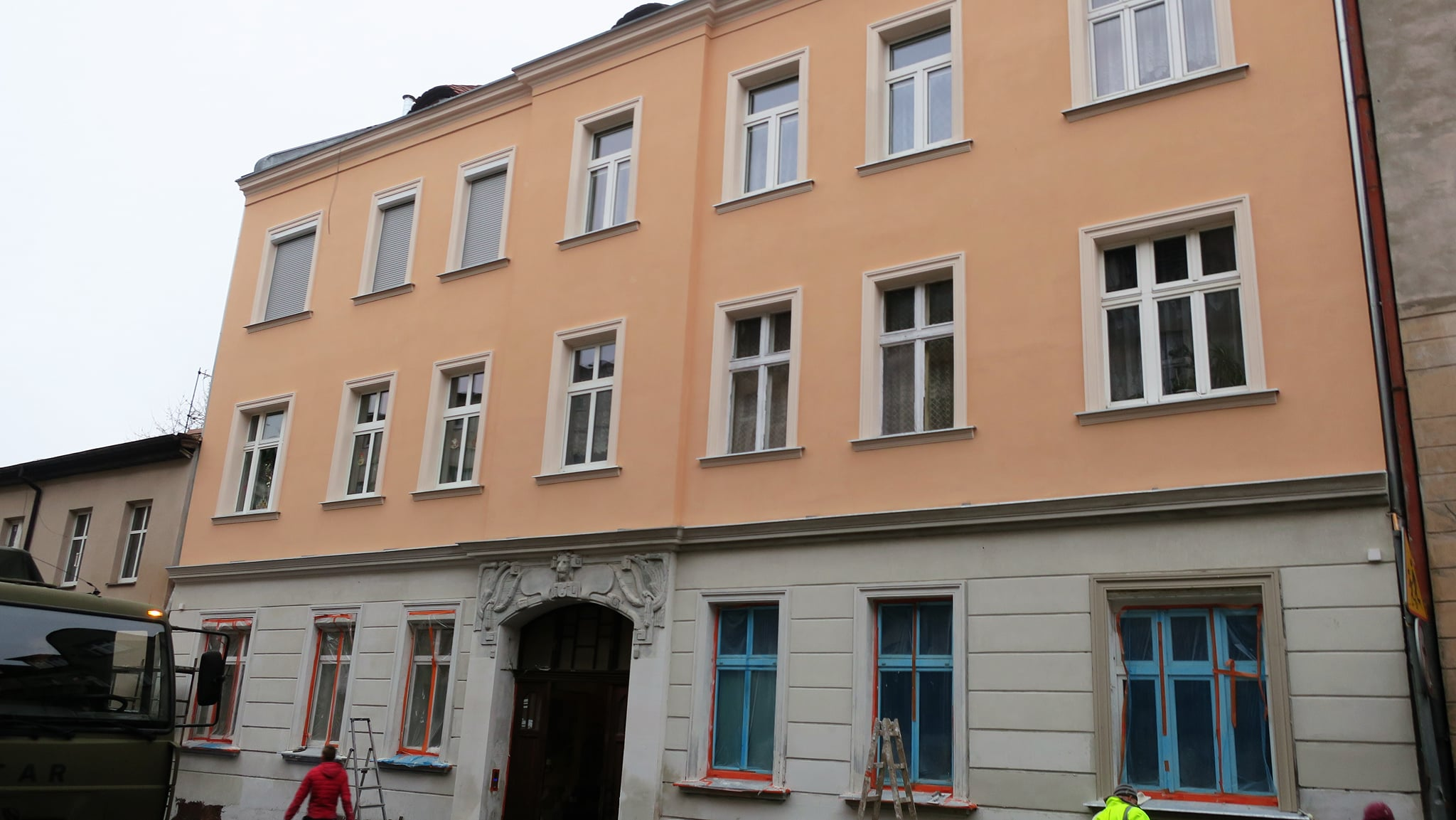
Facade being renovated

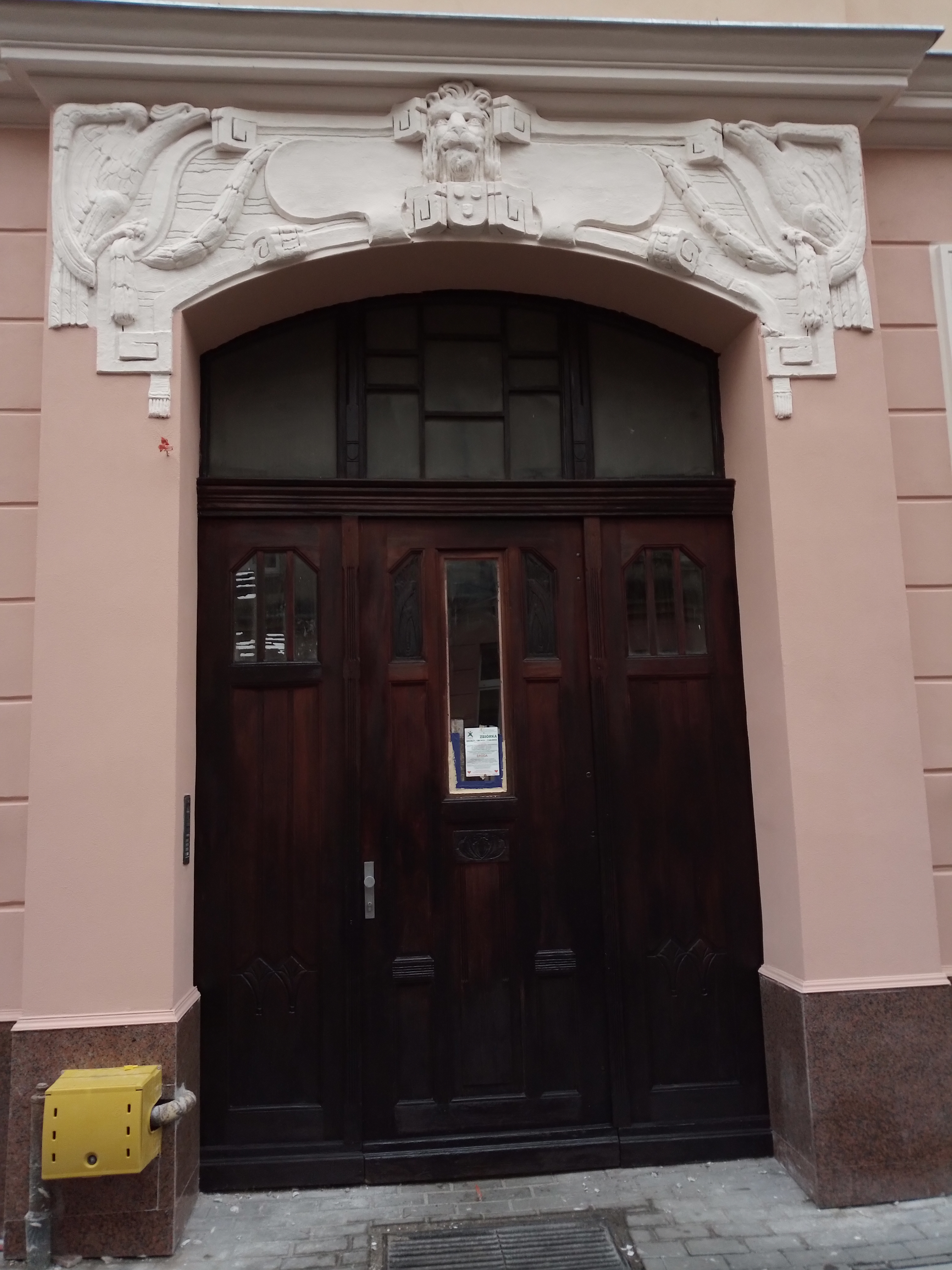
Art Nouveau Portal

=== Tenement at 11, corner with Kościuszki street ===
1896–1897

Eclecticism

The tenement was first listed at "Königstraße 45" (today's Kościuszki street), owned by a merchand, Friedrich Guse. At the turn of the 20th century, another merchant, Antoni Cywiński, purchased and kept it till the start of WWII.

Distinctive style facades with eclectic details (pediments, empty cartouches, bossage on the corner elevation) mixed with plain orange bricks.

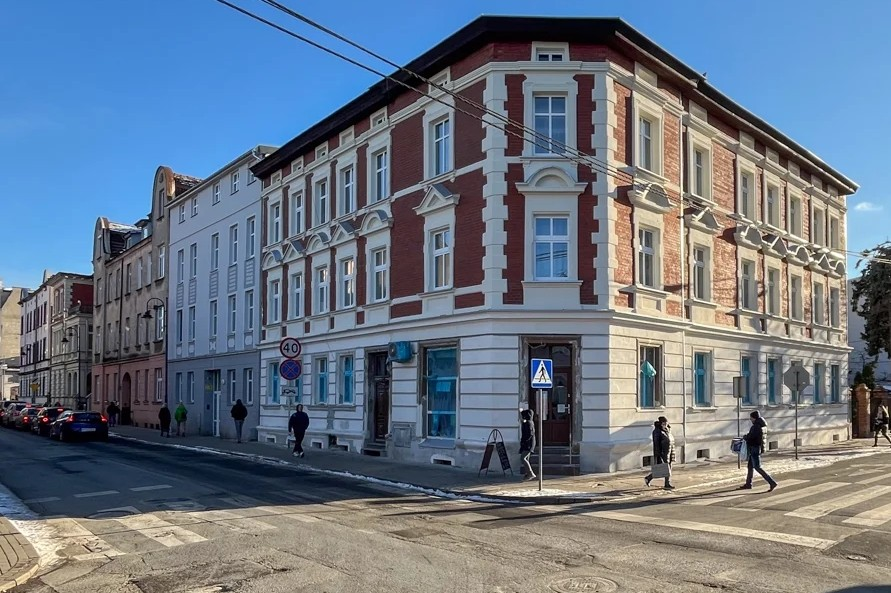
Corner view

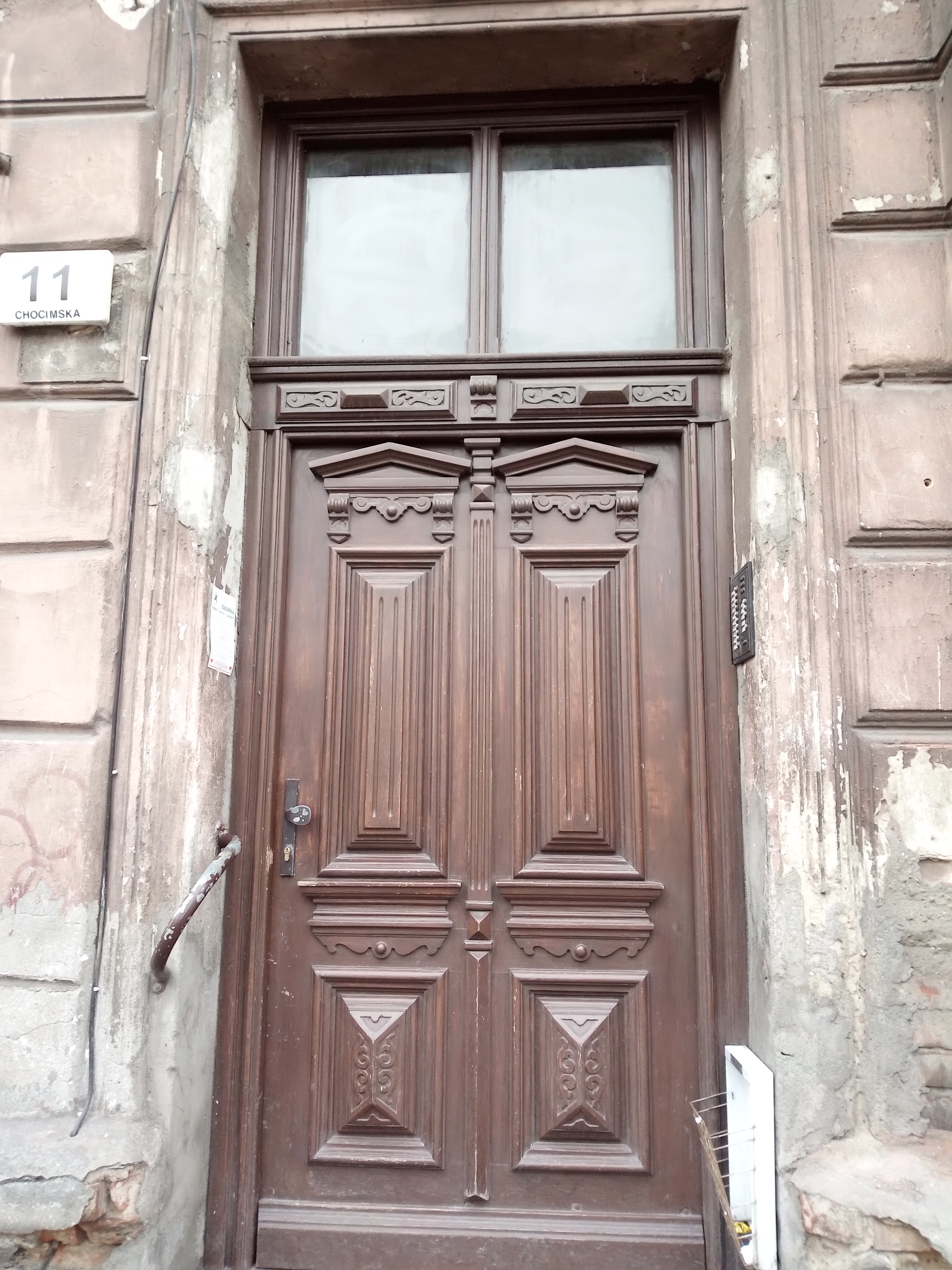
Door onto Chocimska street

=== Former factory building at 27 Kościuszki, corner with Chocimska street ===
1906, by Paul Sellner

In 1906, a 5 hectares (12 acres) plot of land at the corner of Kościuszki and Chocimska streets, in downtown district, was bought by shoe-business entrepreneur Antoni Weynerowski to increase the capacity of his former workshop in 34 Swiętej Trojcy street (non existent today). Antoni asked architect Paul Sellner to design a modern factory complex with two storeys, an attic, facilities for workers and a freight elevator.

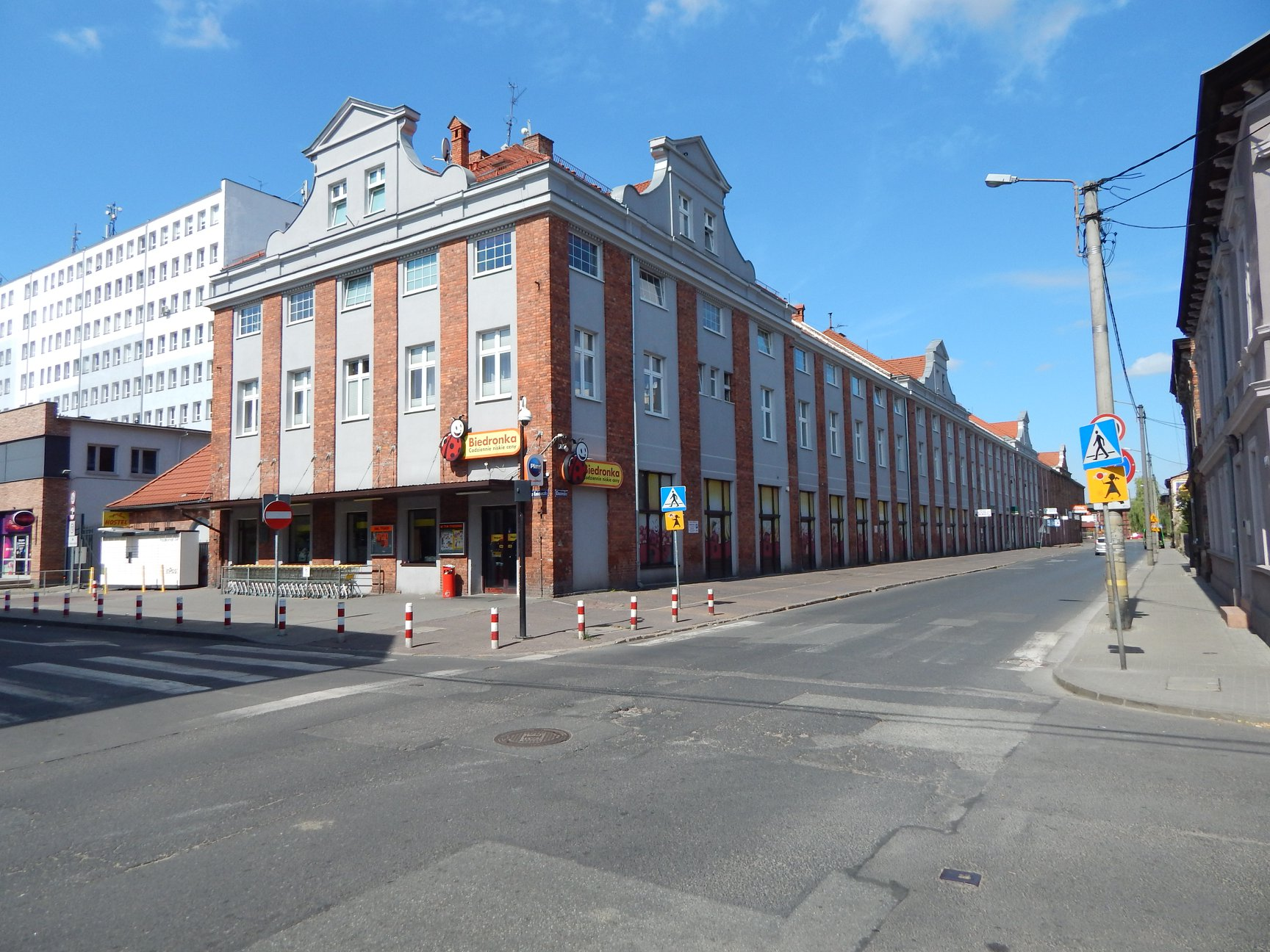
View from street crossing

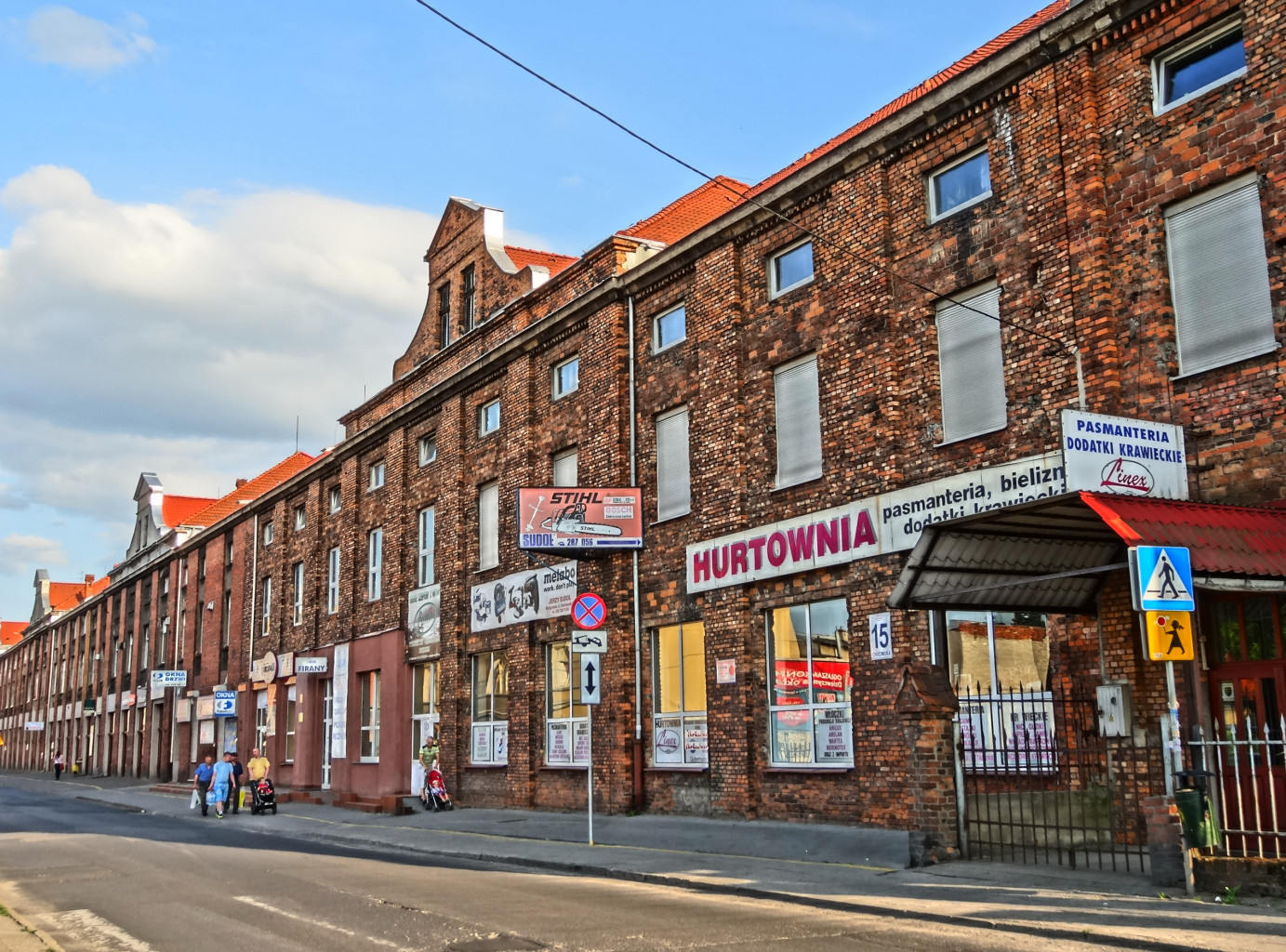
Facade Chocimska street

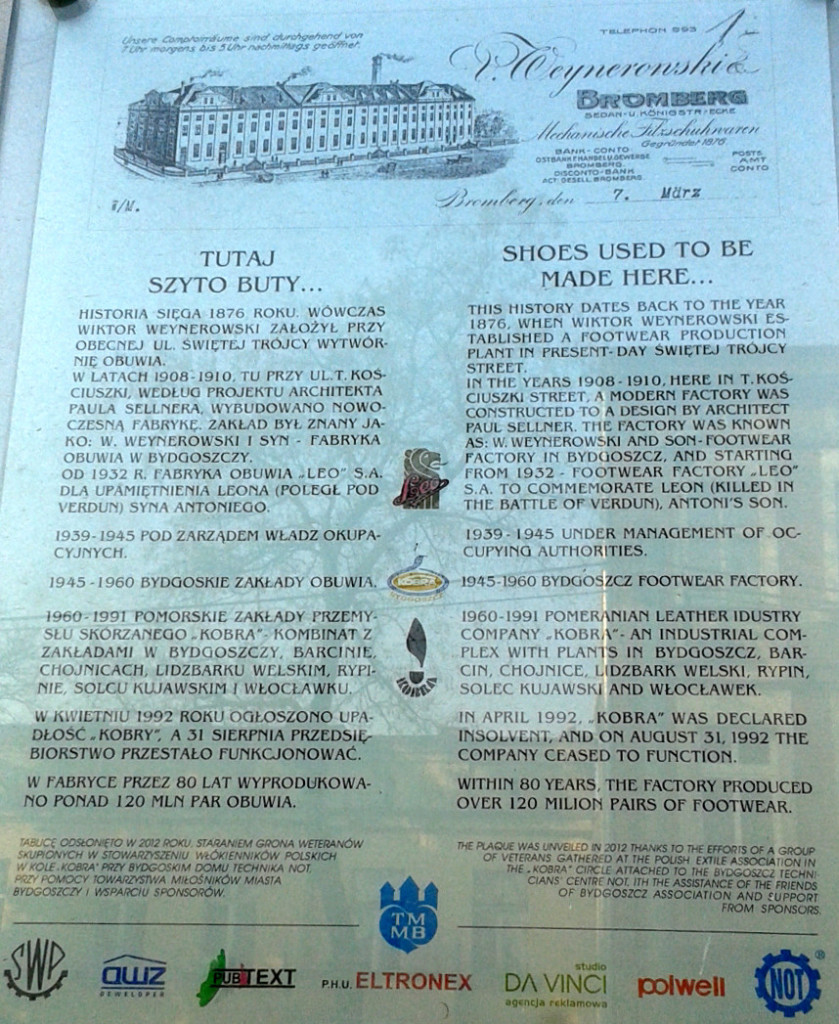
Information board along the building

=== Tenement at 16, corner with Kościuszki street ===
1895

Eclecticism

The tenement was initially the property of Franz ßawlowski, a mason living at today's 26, who put it for renting.

Nicely renovated in 2017, both elevations exhibit stuccoed motifs around the openings, a corbel table on the eaves as well as a delicate mascaron above the entrance on Chocimska street.

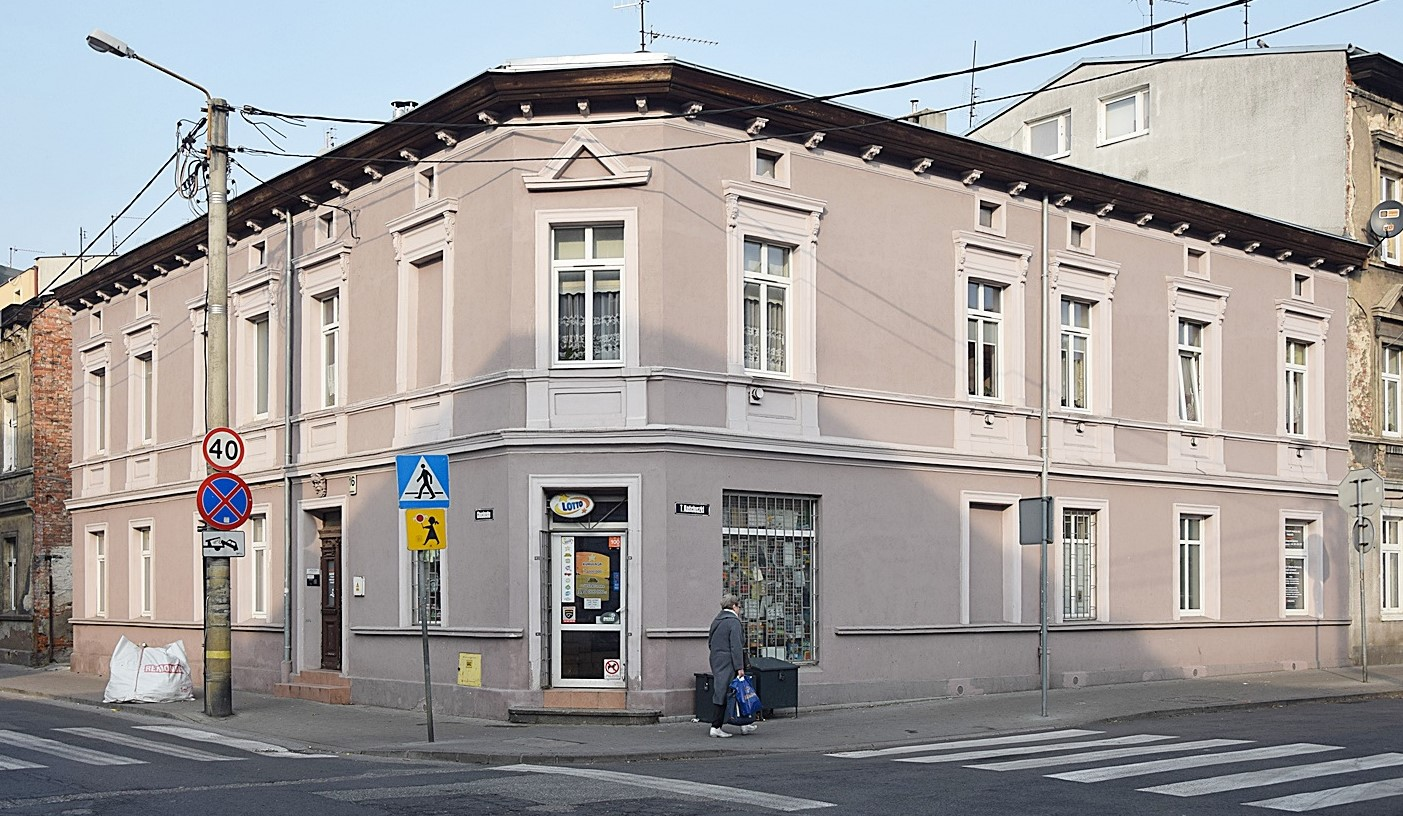
View from street crossing

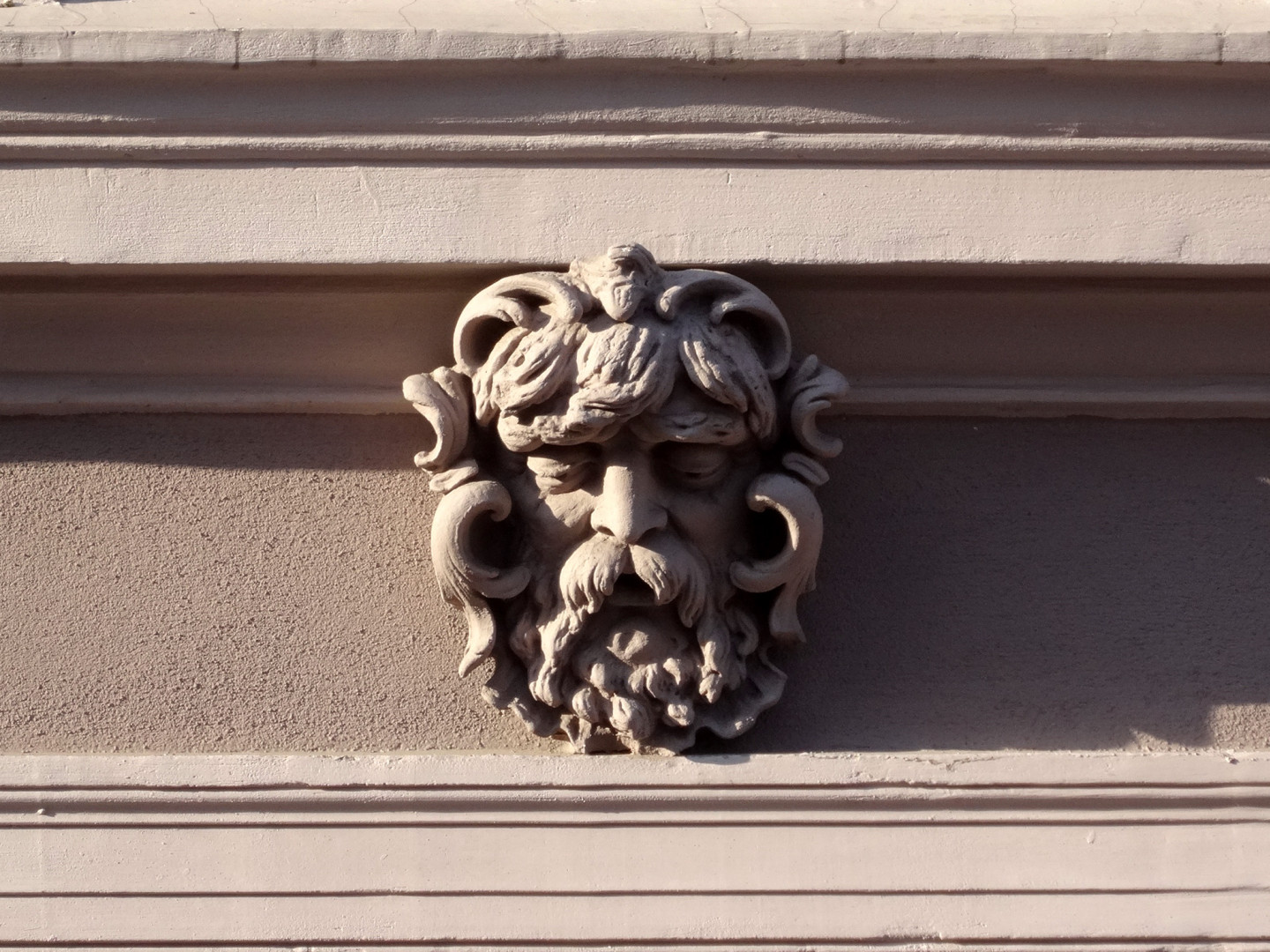
Mascaron

=== Tenement at 18 ===
1897

Eclecticism

The first landlord was Heinrich ßick, registered as a "worker" at then "11 Sedan straße", still visible on the elevation.

The damaged facade displays some painted cartouches, stuccoed lintels and heavily adorned eaves with corbels.

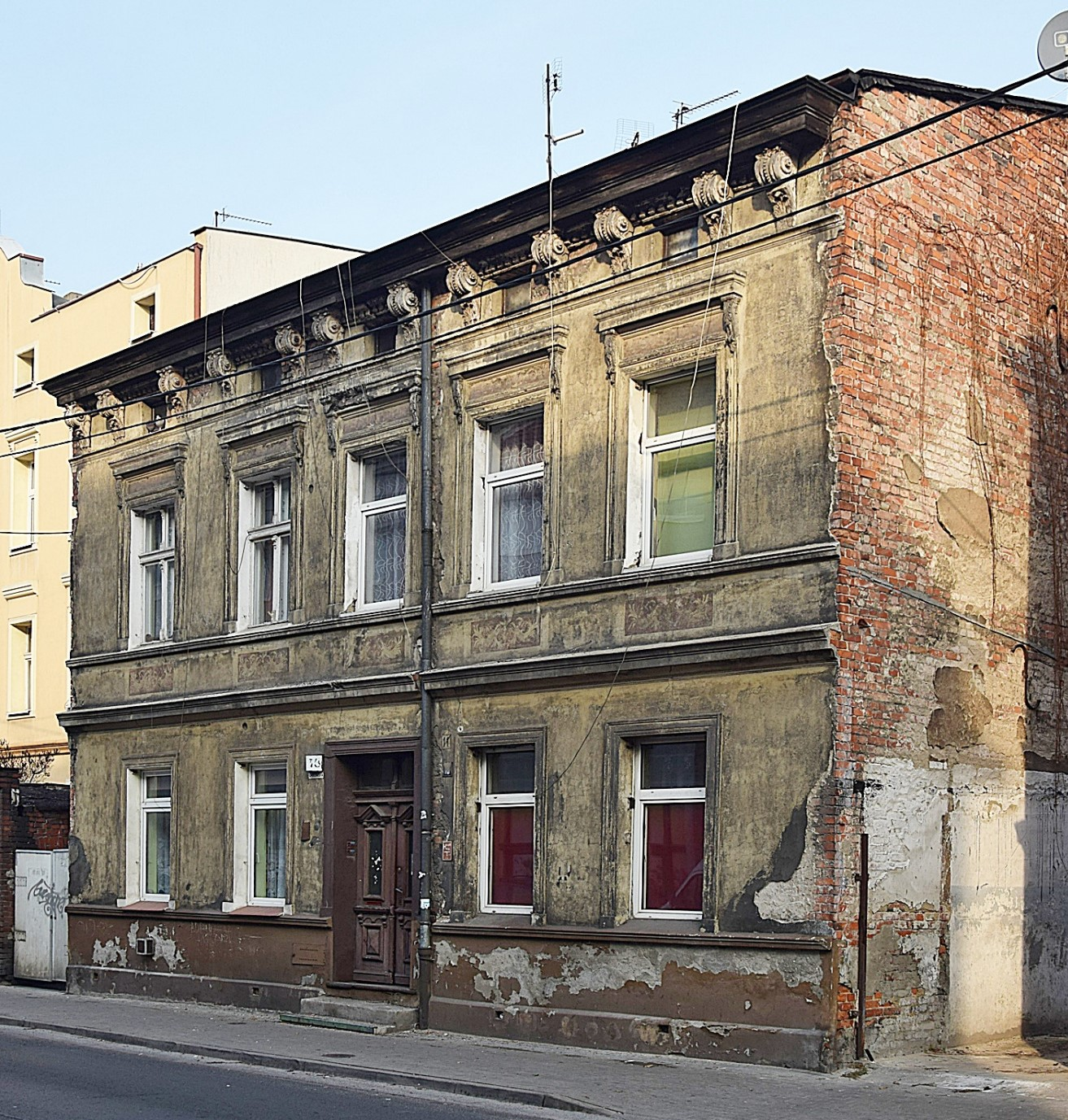
View from the street

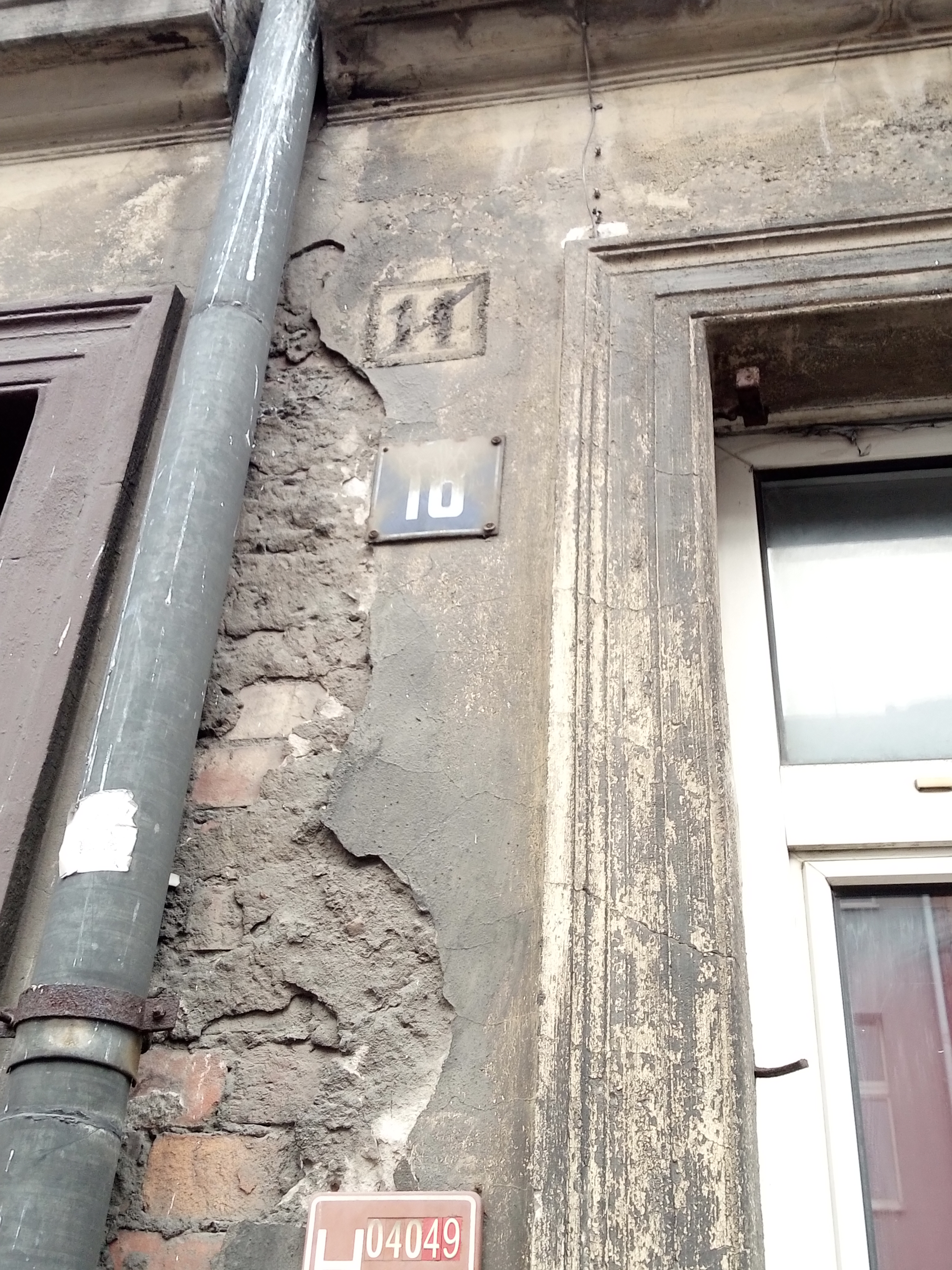
Faded ancient street number (11)

=== Lubański tenement at 20 ===
1906

Late Art Nouveau

Marie Lubański, a widow, was registered as first landlord of the current building, although the plot had been constructed earlier.

The Lubański family was still possessing this edifice at the outset of WWII.

The building has been refurbished in 2017. One can highlight the wooden door displaying Art Nouveau vegetal motifs.

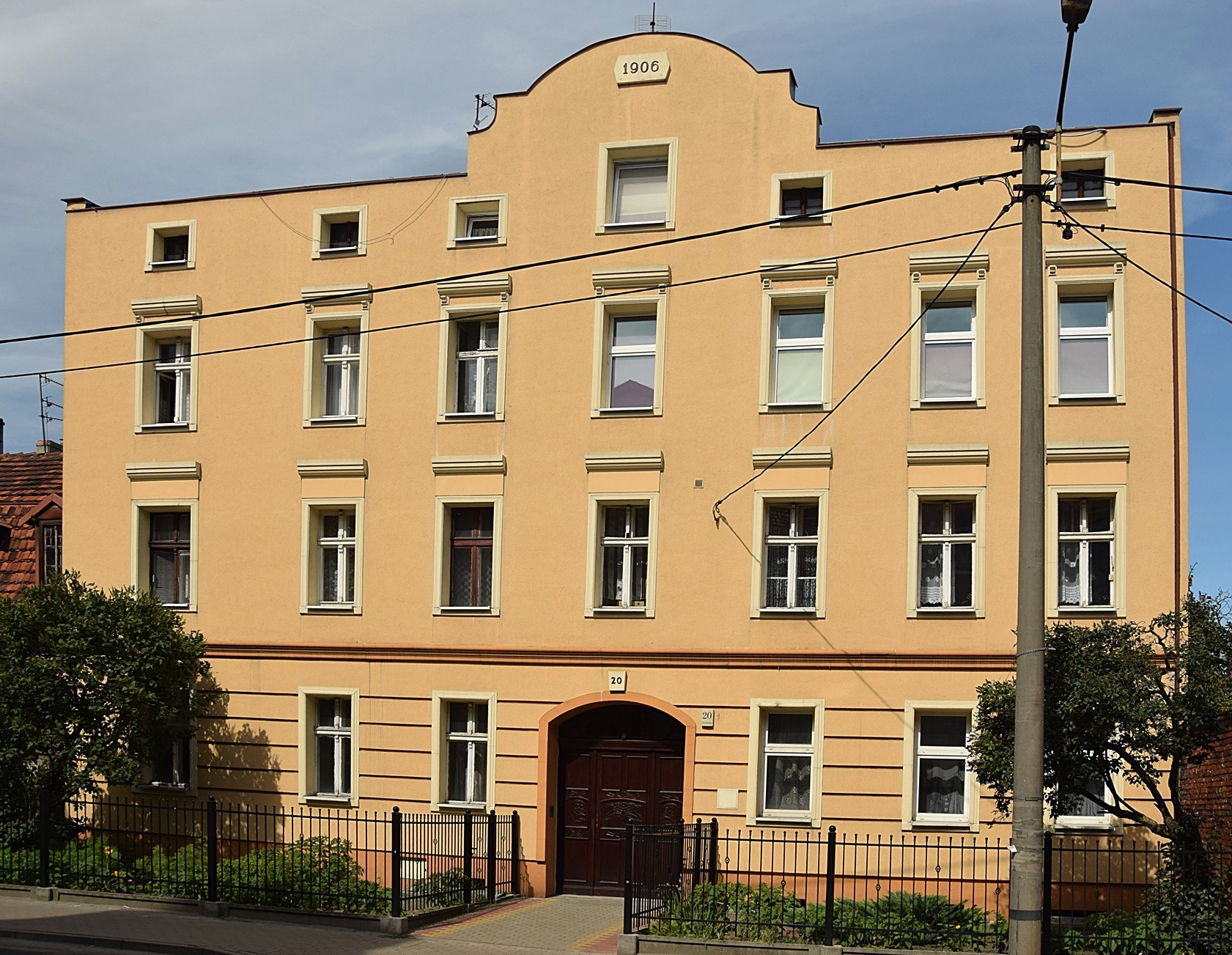
Facade on the street

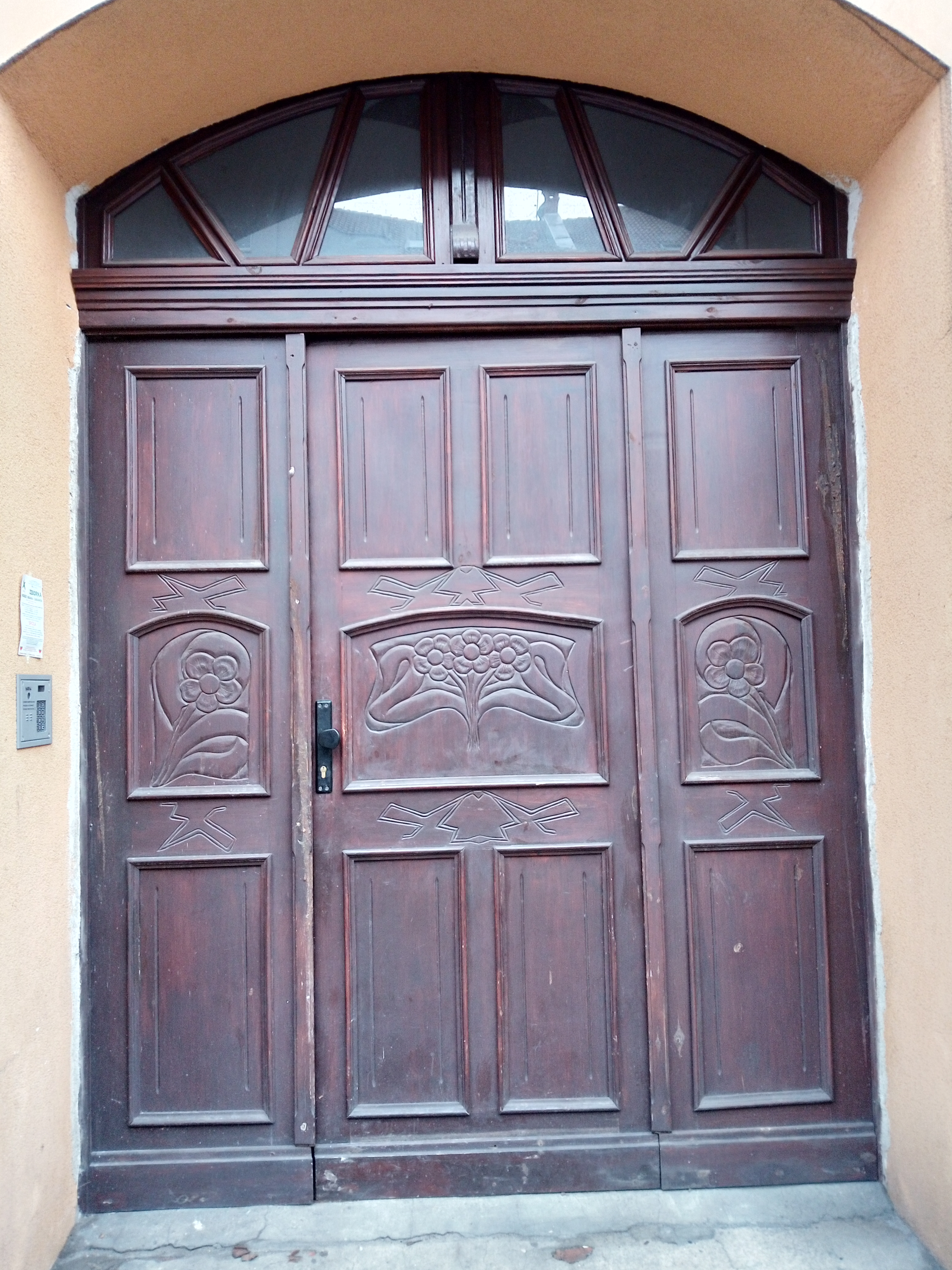
Art Nouveau entrance door

=== Villa at 22 ===
1922–1924

Late Art Nouveau

Jan Dąbrowski was the first landlord of this villa at then "9 ulica Chocimska". He was running a construction company (Polish: Przędsiebiorstwo budowlane).

Despite the ruined elevations, one can make out the entrance door with Art Nouveau details, the avant-corps topped by a terrace as well as the distinctive shape of the wall-gable.

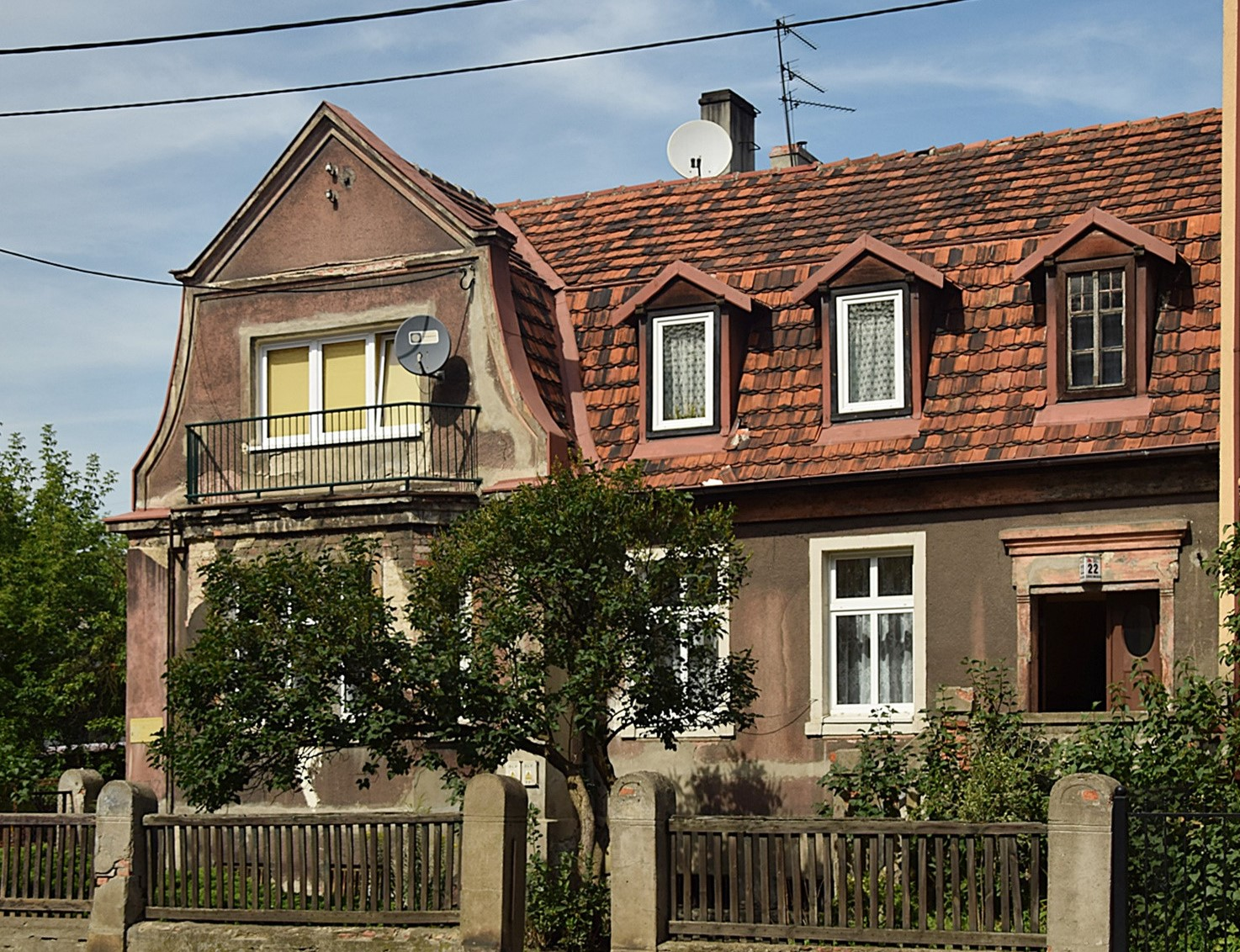
Main facade on the street

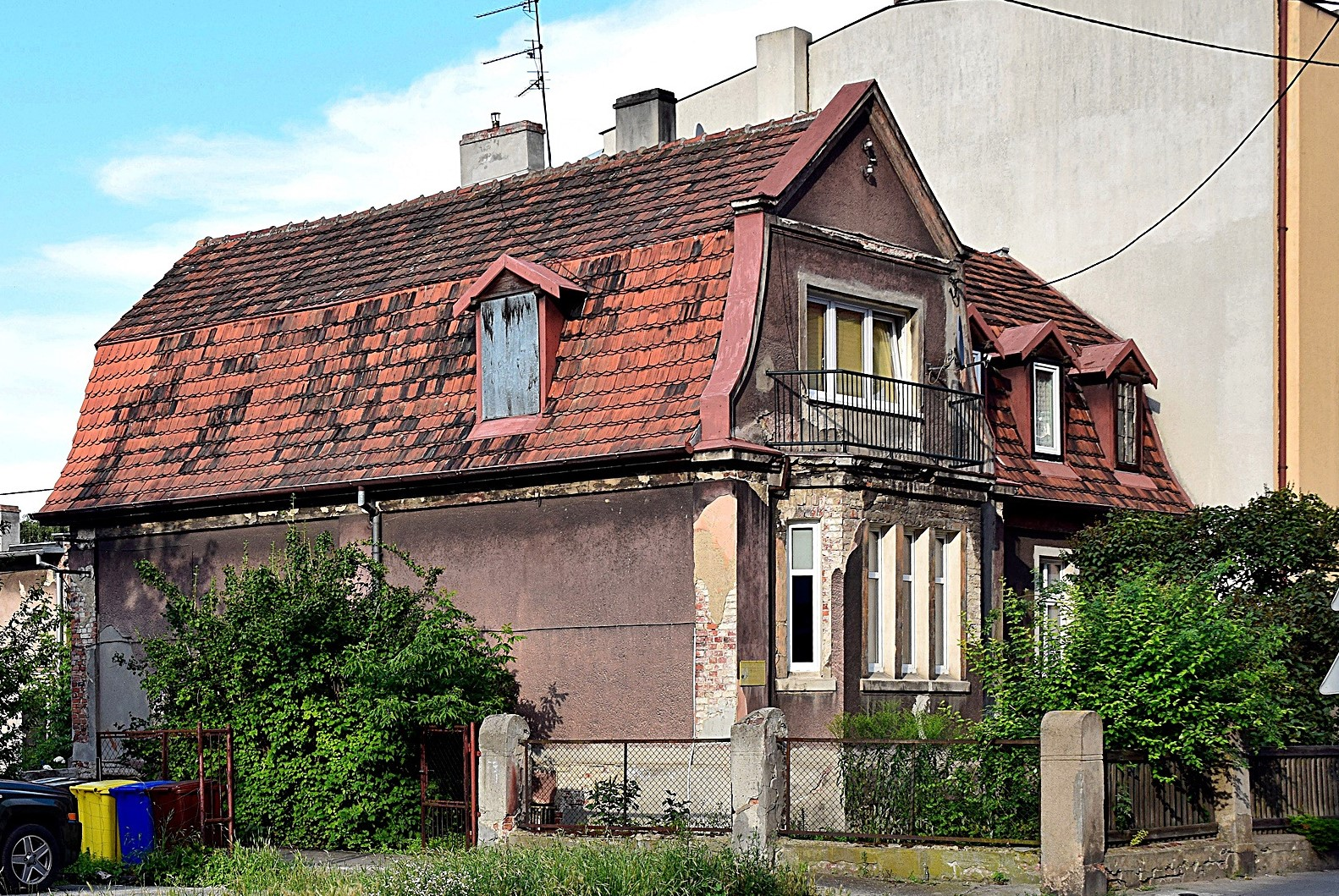
Side view

=== Tenement at 26 ===
1894, and 1920

Art Nouveau

The previous building, from the late 19th century, was owned by Franz ßawlowski, a mason, also the landlord the villa at 16. He lived there till WWI. In 1920, the current house has been erected. It went through a renovation in 2021–2022.

Worth noticing are the adorned lintels of the first floor windows and the triangular pediment above the entrance displaying a woman figure with roses.

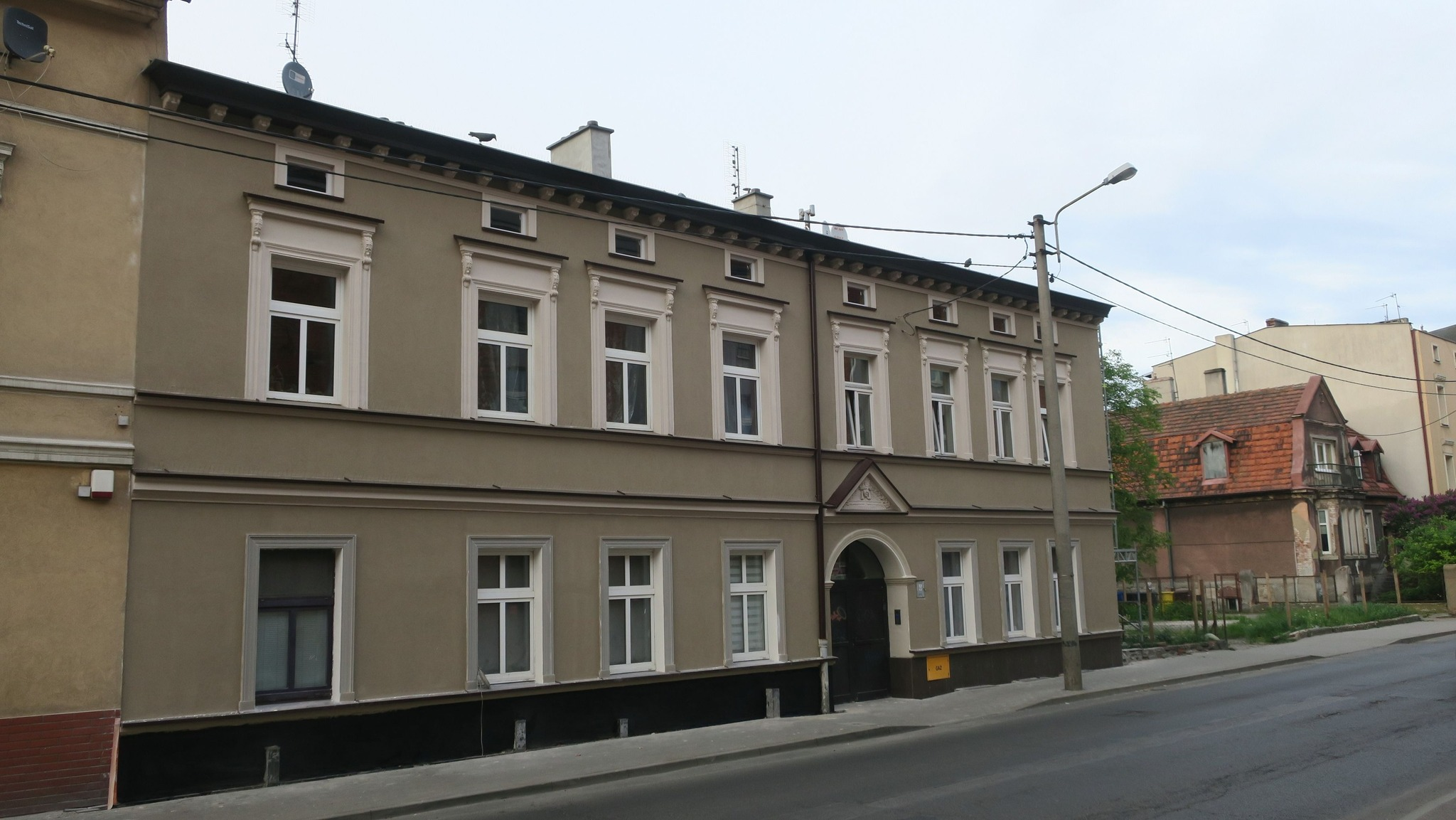
View from the street

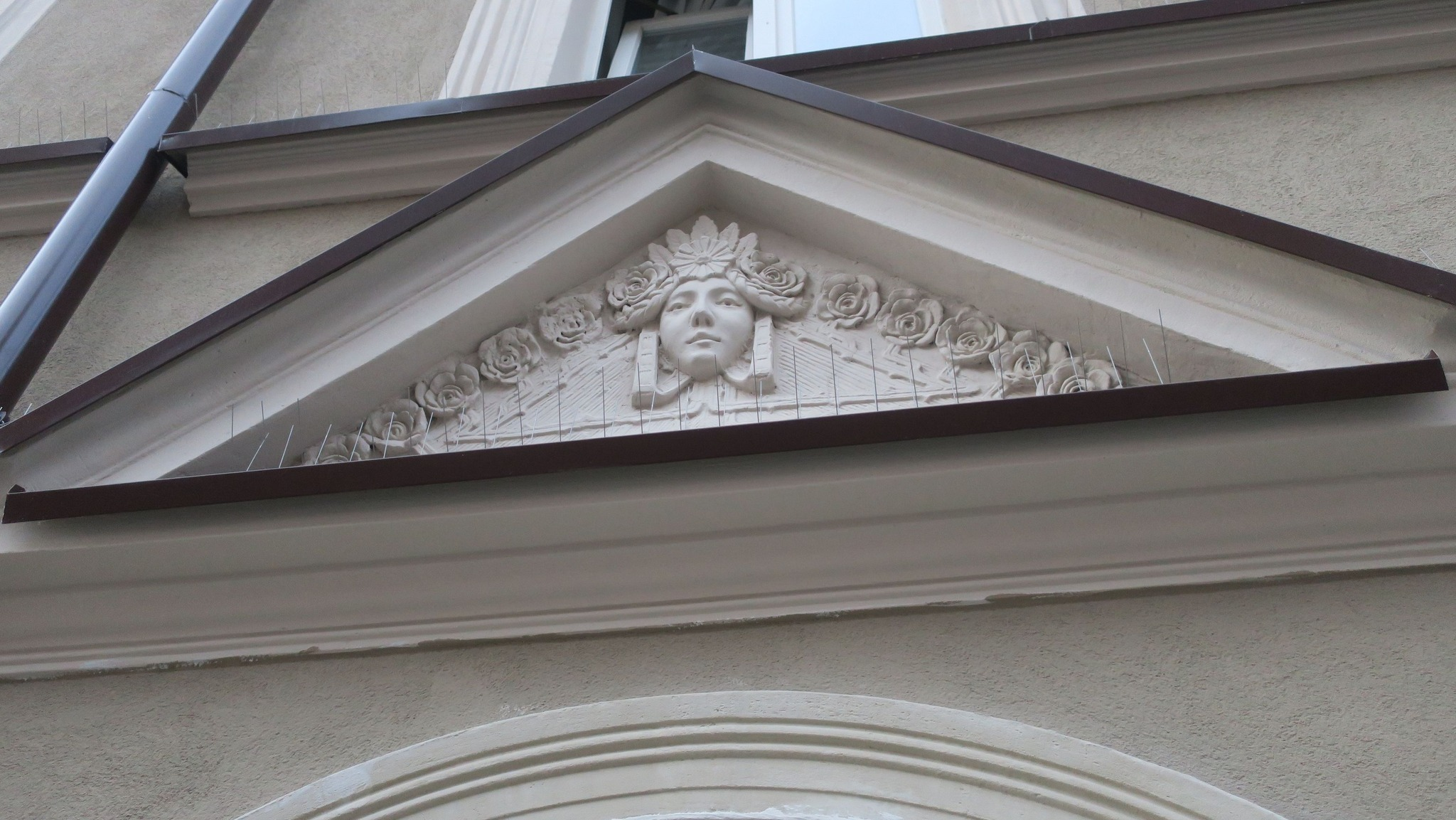
Detail of the pediment

=== Londynek, corner with Pomorska street ===
1873–1878

Half timbered barracks

These buildings are the remnants of military barracks where was billeted the "Prussian Infantry Regiment Nr.148" (German: 5. Westpreußisches Infanterie-Regiment Nr. 148), from 1878 till the outbreak of World War I. The construction of the barracks was conducted by Albin Cohnfeld, a wealthy merchant of the city.

After 1920, premises housed the Polish "61st Infantry Regiment" (Polish: 61 Pułk Piechoty) till 1933. In 1936, the military fencing was razed and most of the barracks were transformed into a housing estate for the poor.

The area is dubbed "Londynek" (Small London) for houses' likeness to some 19th century London half timbered buildings. Some edifices are today inhabited, others are being renovated as part of a local urban revitalization project.

The building are all half timbered edifices, infilled by brick. Such military architecture can be also found in Gdańska Street 147, since Bydgoszcz was an important garrison city under Prussian rule.

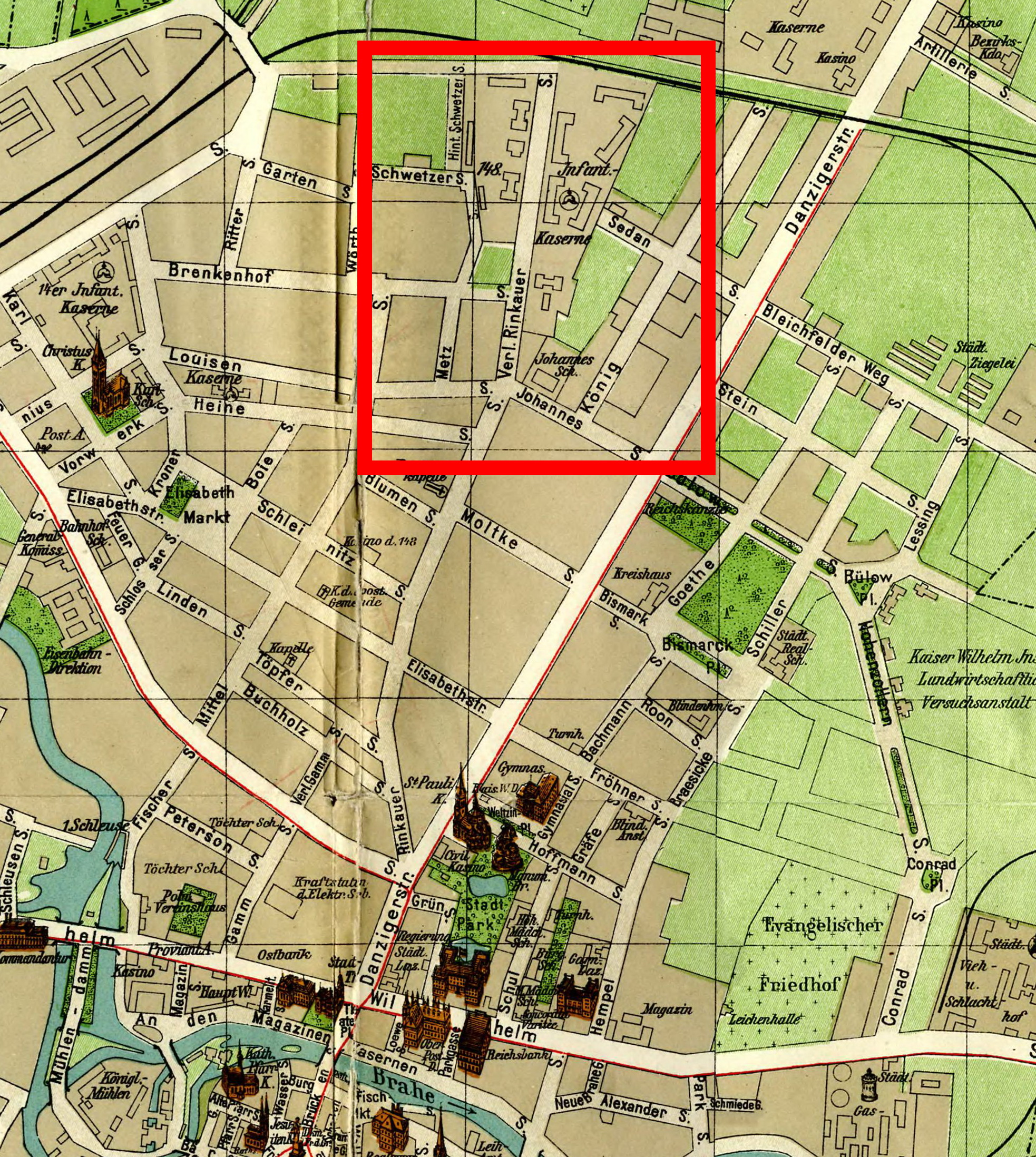
Location of the barracks on a 1914 map

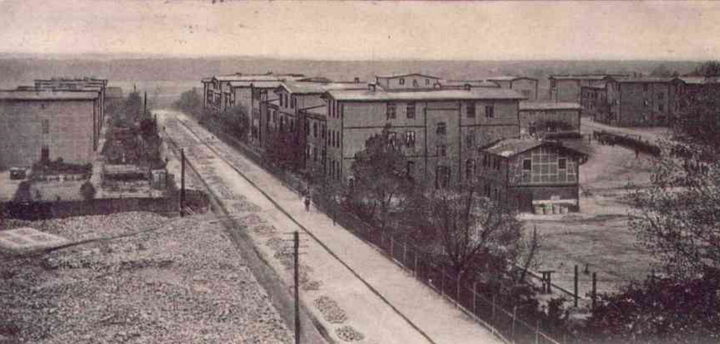
View of the barracks ca 1920s

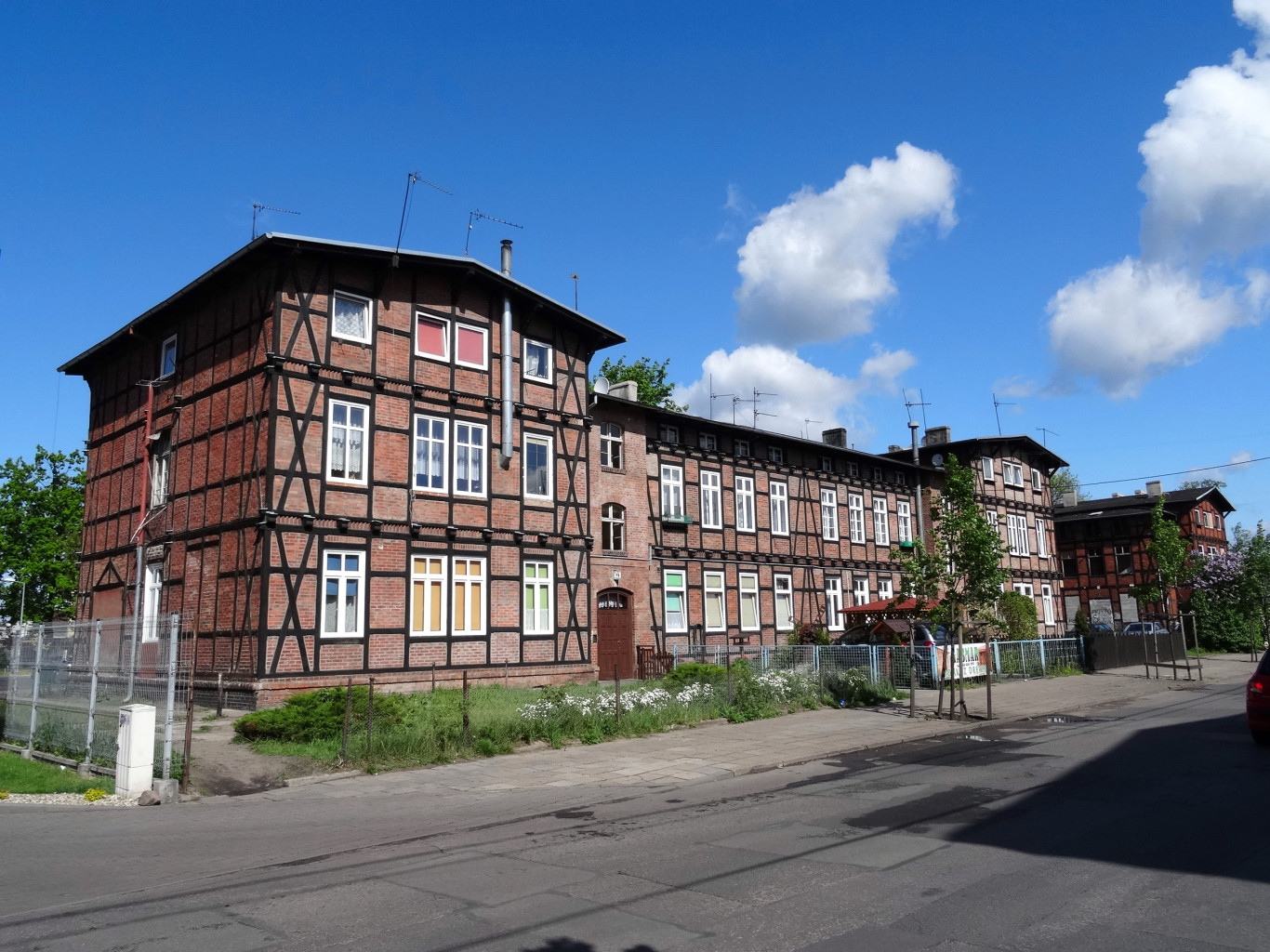
Renovated houses at Nr.75

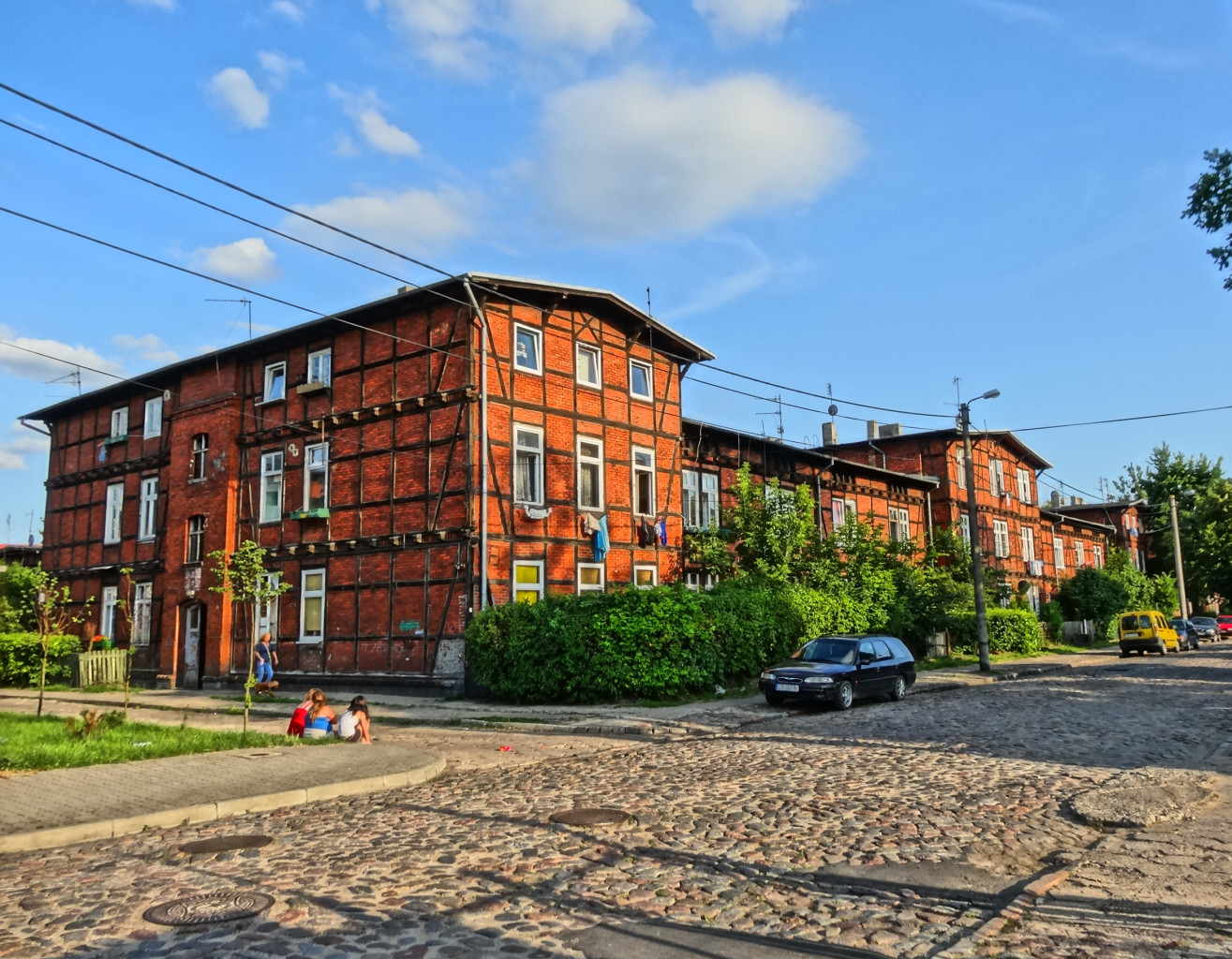
Houses at Nr.88

== See also ==
- Bydgoszcz
- Jagiellońska street
- Tadeusza Kościuszki street, Bydgoszcz
- Józef Święcicki
- Antoni Weynerowski
