= Papyrus Oxyrhynchus 1 =

3rd-century Greek manuscript

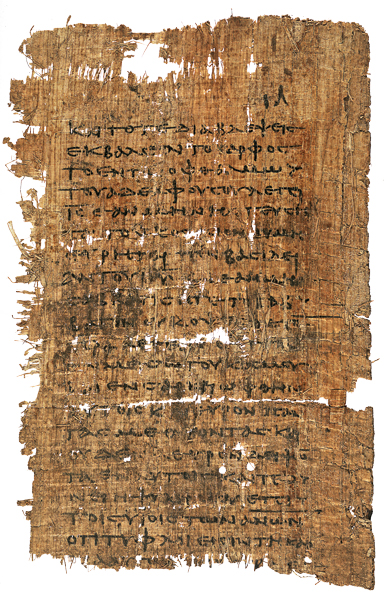
P. Oxy. 1

Papyrus Oxyrhynchus 1 (P. Oxy. 1) is a papyrus fragment of the logia of Jesus written in Greek (Logia Iesou). It was among the first of the Oxyrhynchus Papyri discovered by Grenfell and Hunt. It was discovered on the second day of excavation, 12 January 1897, in the garbage mounds in the Egyptian town of Oxyrhynchus. The fragment is dated to the early half of the 3rd century. Grenfell and Hunt originally dated the fragment between 150 and 300, but "probably not written much later than the year 200." It was later discovered to be the oldest manuscript of the Gospel of Thomas.

== Description ==
The manuscript was written on papyrus in codex form. The measurements of the original leaf were 140–148 by 90–95 millimetres (5.5–5.8 by 3.5–3.7 in). The text is written in uncial letters, with one column per page and 21 lines per page, in a reformed documentary hand. The last line is fragmented. There is a pagination at the upper right corner (number ΙΑ = 11 on the verso). The nomina sacra are written in an abbreviated way (Ι̅Σ̅, Θ̅Υ̅, Π̅Ρ̅Α̅, Α̅Ν̅Ω̅Ν̅).

According to Grenfell and Hunt, who identified this fragment only as Logia Iesu ("Sayings of Jesus"), the original manuscript contained a collection of Jesus's sayings, which were independent of the four Gospels in their present form. They classified it as non-heretical and placed the origin of its sayings as earlier than 140 A.D. They observed some parallels with the works of Clement of Alexandria.

== History ==
Grenfell and Hunt did not realize they had discovered part of the Gospel of Thomas, as at the time there was no reference text. The only complete copy of the Gospel of Thomas was found in 1945 when a Coptic version was discovered at Nag Hammadi with a collection of early Christian Gnostic texts, and it was only after that discovery that the text of Oxyrhynchus Papyri I was able to be attributed.

The fragment contains logia (sayings) 26–28 of the Gospel of Thomas on the recto, and logia 29–33 on the verso of the leaf. with what appears as the last two sentences of logion 77 in the Nag Hammadi Coptic version included at the end of logion 30 – Greek from pOxy1 and Coptic from Nag Hammadi:

Saying 26 (pOxy. 1.1–4)
"... and then you will see clearly to cast out the speck that is in your brother’s eye."
Nag Hammadi version:
Jesus said, "You see the mote in your brother's eye, but you do not see the beam in your own eye. When you cast the beam out of your own eye, then you will see clearly to cast the mote from your brother's eye."

Saying 27 (pOxy. 1.4–11)
Jesus said, "If you do not fast from the world, you will not find the kingdom of God. And if you do not keep the sabbath a sabbath, you will not see the father."
Nag Hammadi version:
<Jesus said,> "If you do not fast as regards the world, you will not find the kingdom. If you do not observe the Sabbath as a Sabbath, you will not see the father."

Saying 28 (pOxy. 1.11–21)
Jesus said, "I s[t]ood in the midst of the world and in the flesh I appeared to them. I found everyone drunk and none thirsty among them. My soul worries about the children of humanity because they are blind in thei[r] hearts and [they] do [not] see."
Nag Hammadi version:
Jesus said, "I took my place in the midst of the world, and I appeared to them in flesh. I found all of them intoxicated; I found none of them thirsty. And my soul became afflicted for the sons of men, because they are blind in their hearts and do not have sight; for empty they came into the world, and empty too they seek to leave the world. But for the moment they are intoxicated. When they shake off their wine, then they will repent."

Saying 29 (pOxy. 1.22)
"[. . .he dwells in th]i[s] poverty."
Nag Hammadi version:
Jesus said, "If the flesh came into being because of spirit, it is a wonder. But if spirit came into being because of the body, it is a wonder of wonders. Indeed, I am amazed at how this great wealth has made its home in this poverty."

Saying 30 + 77b (pOxy. 1.23–30)
[Jesus sa]id, ["Wh]ere there are [th]r[ee] t[hey ar]e [without] God. And [w]here there is only o[ne], I say, I am with hi[m]. Li[f]t the stone and there you will find me. Split the wood and I am there."
Nag Hammadi version:
(30) Jesus said, "Where there are three gods, they are gods. Where there are two or one, I am with him."
(77b) ...Split a piece of wood, and I am there. Lift up the stone, and you will find me there."

Saying 31 (pOxy. 1.30-35)
Jesus said, "A prophet is not acceptable in h[i]s homeland. Nor does a physician perform healings for those who know him."
Nag Hammadi version:
Jesus said, "No prophet is accepted in his own village; no physician heals those who know him."

Saying 32 (pOxy. 1.36-41)
Jesus said, "A city that has been built and established on the summit of a high [m]ountain can neither fa[l]l nor be hi[d]den."
Nag Hammadi version:
Jesus said, "A city being built on a high mountain and fortified cannot fall, nor can it be hidden."

Saying 33 (pOxy. 1.41-42)
Jesus said, "What you hear [i]n your one ear . . ."
Nag Hammadi version:
Jesus said, "Preach from your housetops that which you will hear in your ear. For no one lights a lamp and puts it under a bushel, nor does he put it in a hidden place, but rather he sets it on a lampstand so that everyone who enters and leaves will see its light."

Grenfell and Hunt also discovered another two fragments of this apocryphal Gospel: P. Oxy. 654 and P. Oxy. 655.

It was discovered by Hunt on the second day of the excavations. In November 1900, P. Oxy. 1 was given to the Bodleian Library by the Egypt Exploration Fund. The fragment is housed at the Bodleian Library (Ms. Gr. th. e 7 (P)).

== See also ==
- Oxyrhynchus Papyri
- Papyrus Oxyrhynchus 2
- Nag Hammadi Codex II
- British Library Or 4926
