= Papyrus Oxyrhynchus 655 =

Fragment of the Gospel of Thomas

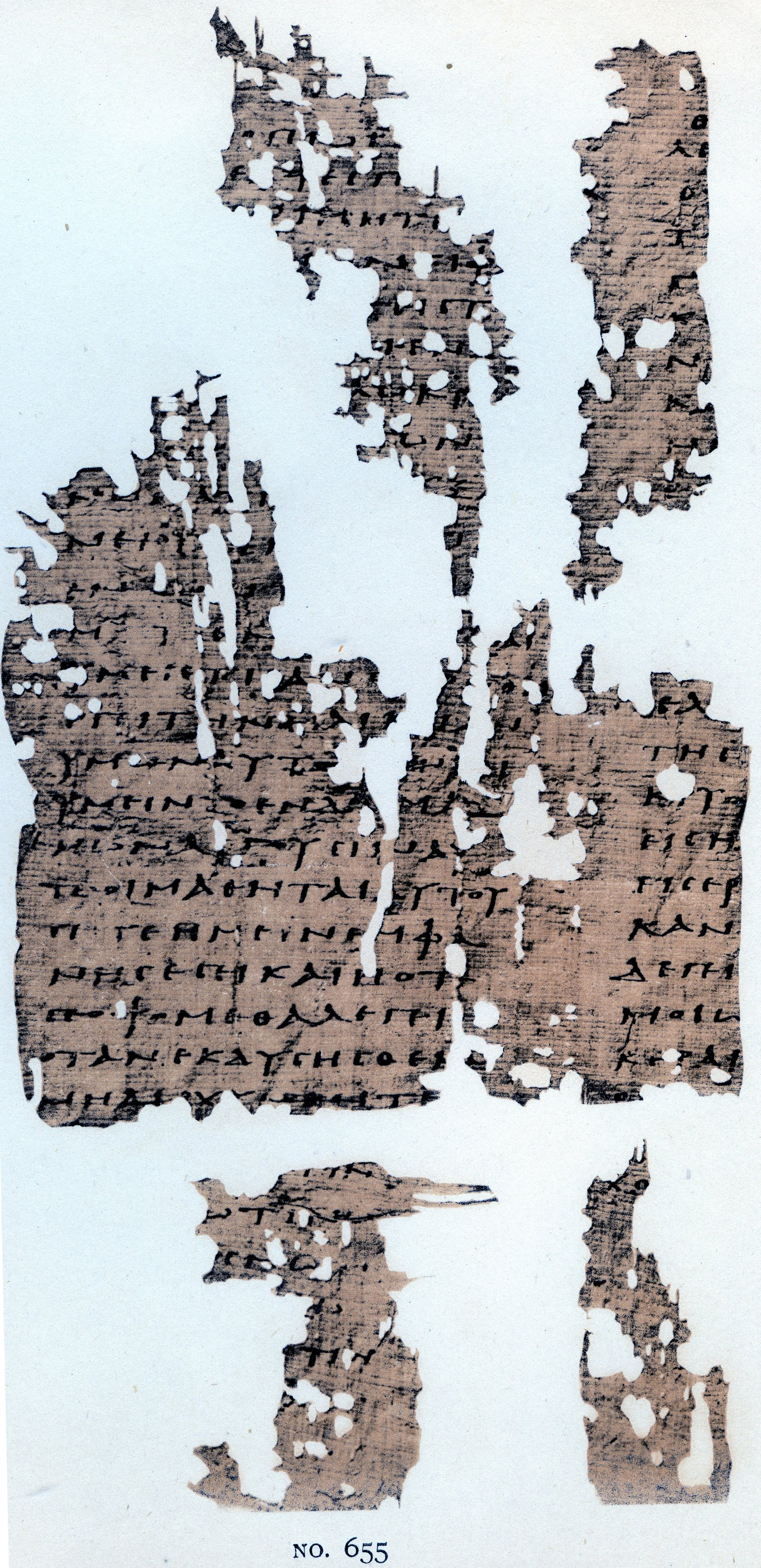
P. Oxy. 655

Papyrus Oxyrhynchus 655 (P. Oxy. 655) is a papyrus fragment of the logia of Jesus written in Greek. It is one of the Oxyrhynchus Papyri discovered by Grenfell and Hunt between 1897 and 1904 in the Egyptian town of Oxyrhynchus. The fragment is dated to the early 3rd century. It is one of only three Greek manuscripts of the Gospel of Thomas.

== Description ==
The manuscript was written on papyrus in scroll form. The measurements of the original leaf were 82 mm by 83 mm. The text is written in uncial letters. It is well written in an informal book hand. There is no punctuation, no rough breathings, no accents, no division between sayings, nor instances of using of the nomina sacra. One correction was made in a cursive hand.

The fragment contains logia (sayings) 36–39 of the Gospel of Thomas on the recto side of the leaf.

Grenfell and Hunt also discovered another two fragments of this apocryphal Gospel: P. Oxy. 1 and P. Oxy. 654.

According to Grenfell and Hunt, who identified this fragment as being from an uncanonical Gospel, it is very close to the Synoptic Gospels. They observed some similarities to the Gospel of Luke. According to them it could have belonged to the Gospel according to the Egyptians (as postulated by Adolf Harnack), or a collections of Jesus's Sayings used in the Second Epistle of Clement. Grenfell and Hunt observed some similarities to the P. Oxy. 654. Its proper identification was achieved after a complete copy of the Gospel of Thomas in Coptic was discovered in 1945 at Nag Hammadi, included in a collection of early Christian Gnostic texts.

In 1904, P. Oxy. 655 was given to Harvard University by the Egypt Exploration Fund. The fragment is housed at the Houghton Library, Harvard University (SM Inv. 4367) in Cambridge.

== See also ==
- Oxyrhynchus Papyri
