= Papyrus Oxyrhynchus 654 =

Papyrus fragment of the Gospel of Thomas

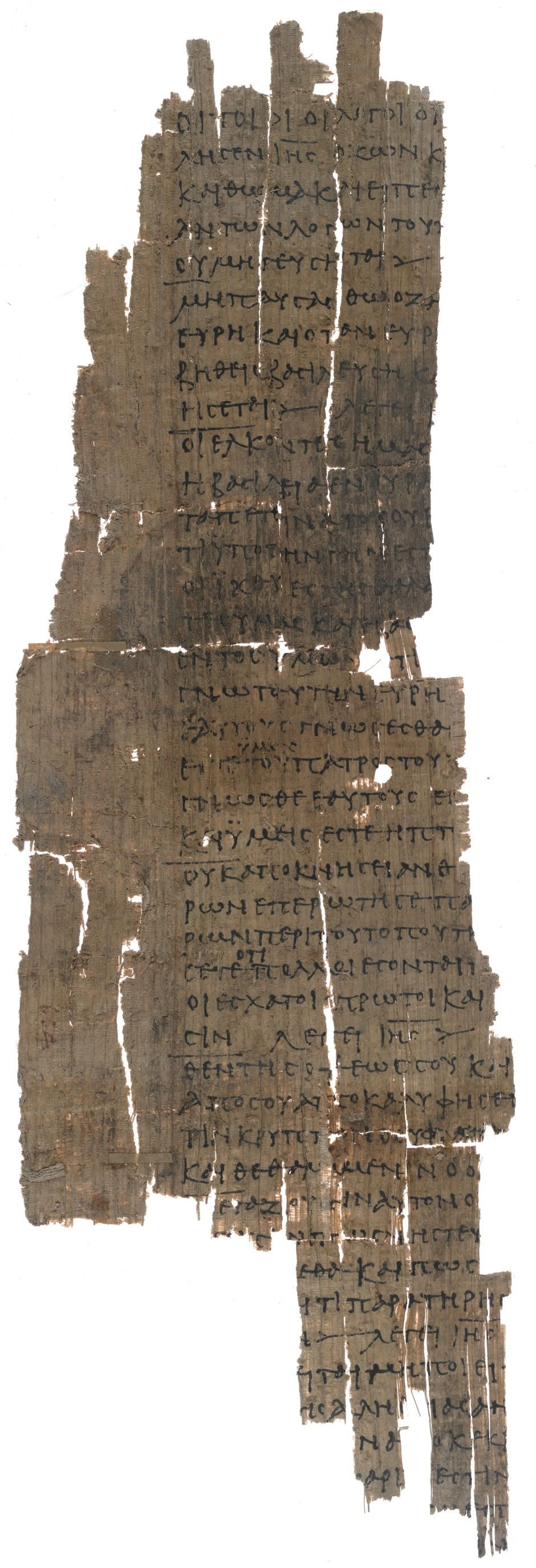
P. Oxy. 654

Papyrus Oxyrhynchus 654 (P. Oxy. 654) is a papyrus fragment of the logia of Jesus written in Greek. It is one of the Oxyrhynchus Papyri discovered by Grenfell and Hunt between 1897 and 1904 in the Egyptian town of Oxyrhynchus. The fragment is dated to the middle or late 3rd century. It is one of only three Greek manuscripts of the Gospel of Thomas.

== Description ==
The manuscript was written on papyrus in scroll form. The measurements of the original leaf were 142 mm by 155 mm. The text is written in cursive letters, in a competent hand. It uses diaeresis over initial upsilon; two corrections were made. The nomina sacra are written in an abbreviated way (Ι̅Η̅Σ̅ for Ἰησοῦς Jesus).

According to Grenfell and Hunt, who identified this fragment as Logia Iesu ("Sayings of Jesus"), the original manuscript contained a collection of Jesus's sayings. They suggested that original manuscript could be a part of the Gospel of Thomas, or Gospel of Philip. Its proper identification was achieved after a complete copy of the Gospel of Thomas in Coptic was discovered in 1945 at Nag Hammadi, included in a collection of early Christian Gnostic texts.

The fragment contains logia (sayings) 1–7 of the Gospel of Thomas on the verso side of the leaf (opisthograph). Grenfell and Hunt also discovered another two fragments of this apocryphal Gospel: P. Oxy. 1 and P. Oxy. 655.

In 1904, P. Oxy. 654 was given to the British Museum by the Egypt Exploration Fund. The fragment is housed at the Department of manuscripts of the British Library (Inv. 1531) in London.

== See also ==
- Oxyrhynchus Papyri
