= Logia =

Divine saying

The term logia (Greek: λόγια), plural of logion (Greek: λόγιον), is used variously in ancient writings and modern scholarship in reference to communications of divine origin. In non-Abrahamic contexts, the principal meaning was "oracles", while Jewish and Christian writings used logia in reference especially to "the divinely inspired Scriptures". A famous and much-debated occurrence of the term is in the account by Papias of Hierapolis on the origins of the canonical Gospels. Since the 19th century, New Testament scholarship has tended to reserve the term logion for a divine saying, especially one spoken by Jesus, in contrast to narrative, and to call a collection of such sayings, as exemplified by the Gospel of Thomas, logia.

== Ancient use ==
In non-Abrahamic usage, logion was used interchangeably with chresmos (χρησμός) and other such terms in reference to oracles, the pronouncements of the gods obtained usually through divination.

The Septuagint adapted the term logion to mean "Word of God", using it especially for translating אּמְרַת ("imrah"). For example, at Psalms 12:6, the Hebrew text reads: אִֽמֲרֹ֣ות יְהוָה֮ אֲמָרֹ֪ות טְהֹ֫רֹ֥ות. The equivalent passage from the Septuagint (numbered as Psalms 11:7—see here for explanation of numbering), reads: τὰ λόγια Κυρίου λόγια ἁγνά. The King James version reads: "The words of the Lord are pure words."

In Philo, however, the entire Old Testament was considered the Word of God and thus spoken of as the logia, with any passage of Scripture, whatever its length or content, designated a logion; the sense of the word is the same as in the Septuagint, but applied broadly to inspired Scriptures. In this sense logia is used four times in the New Testament and often among the Church Fathers, who also counted the New Testament books among inspired Scripture.

From logia is distinguished a related word logoi (λόγοι), meaning simply "words", often in contrast to práxeis (πράξεις), meaning "deeds". Words spoken by Jesus are consistently designated as logoi in ancient documents.

== Papias of Hierapolis ==
Papias of Hierapolis composed around AD 100 a work, now lost, entitled Exegesis of the Dominical Logia, which Eusebius quotes as an authority on the origins of the Gospels of Mark and Matthew.

On Mark, Papias cites John the Elder:

The Elder used to say: Mark, in his capacity as Peter’s interpreter, wrote down accurately as many things as he recalled from memory—though not in an ordered form—of the things either said or done by the Lord. For he neither heard the Lord nor accompanied him, but later, as I said, Peter, who used to give his teachings in the form of chreiai, but had no intention of providing an ordered arrangement of the logia of the Lord. Consequently Mark did nothing wrong when he wrote down some individual items just as he related them from memory. For he made it his one concern not to omit anything he had heard or to falsify anything.

And the brief excerpt regarding Matthew says:

Therefore Matthew put the logia in an ordered arrangement in the Hebrew dialect, but each person interpreted them as best he could.

So, Papias uses logia in his title and once in regard to each Gospel. Eusebius, who had the complete text before him, understood Papias in these passages as referring to the canonical Gospels.

In the 19th century, however, scholars began to question whether this tradition actually refers to those texts, especially in the case of what Papias ascribes to Matthew. In 1832, Schleiermacher, believing Papias to be writing before these Gospels were regarded as inspired Scripture and before the formation of any New Testament canon, argued that logia could not be understood in its usual sense but must rather be interpreted as utterances (Aussprüche), and that Papias was referring to collections of the sayings of Jesus. Soon afterwards, a new theory of the Synoptic problem emerged, the two-source hypothesis, positing that the double tradition in Matthew and Luke derived from a lost document containing mostly sayings of Jesus. Holtzmann's defense of this theory, which has dominated scholarship ever since, seized upon Schleiermacher's thesis and argued that Papias was attesting a Logienquelle (logia-source), which he designated Λ (lambda). When later scholars abandoned the evidence of Papias as an argument, this hypothetical source came to be more neutrally designated as Q (for Quelle), but the reinterpretation of the word logia already had firmly taken hold in scholarship.

Modern scholars are divided on what Papias actually meant, especially with regard to the logia he ascribes to Matthew, and what underlying historical facts this testimony alludes to. Although some scholars have doubted the Elder’s supposition of Peter’s involvement in Mark’s composition, his attribution of the canonical gospel to John Mark is largely accepted.

Another point of controversy surrounds the statement that Matthew wrote in the "Hebrew dialect", which in Greek could refer to either Hebrew or Aramaic. Some, noting that "dialect" could mean not only a language, or a sub-variant ("dialect" in the modern English sense) of some language, but also, in a technical sense, style, understand Papias to be referring to a Greek language gospel but written in a Semitic style. Others hold that Matthew wrote a Semitic-language work first, before producing a Greek recension recognized as canonical Matthew; Josephus also wrote an Aramaic version of The Jewish War, though both the current gospel of Matthew and the War are not translations from Hebrew or Aramaic. Still others hold that whatever lost work Matthew allegedly wrote—whether a collection of sayings, the Gospel according to the Hebrews, or a prototype of canonical Matthew—was composed in Semitic but translated freely into Greek by others. And some regard Papias as simply mistaken and telling nothing of value.

== Gospel of Thomas ==
The 19th century saw a consensus gather around the two-source hypothesis, positing a hypothetical collection of sayings, along with a growing use of the term logia—whatever Papias had actually meant by it—to refer to such a collection of sayings of Jesus. It was in this context that the first fragments of the Gospel of Thomas were discovered by Grenfell and Hunt in 1897, containing otherwise-unknown sayings of Jesus. Although the term logia does not occur in the papyri in any form, the editors saw this discovery as an example of the very sort of logia hypothesized and accordingly titled their publication Logia Iesu: Sayings of Our Lord. Later finds shed more light on the work, now identified as the Gospel of Thomas condemned by several Church Fathers, which is a series of sayings attributed to Jesus, many found nowhere else, with no narrative framework. Although Grenfell and Hunt soon retracted their inappropriate designation of the text as logia in favor of logoi, it has since become standard to speak of the composition as logia, and of each individual saying as a logion, numbered in most division schemes from 1 to 114.

== Modern use ==
This sense of logion as "something Jesus said" is now in wide use among scholars. The term is sometimes applied to a saying of Jesus contained in any of the canonical Gospels, but it is especially used for any agraphon—a saying of Jesus not otherwise attested. An oft-cited example is Acts 20:35: "And remember the words of the Lord Jesus that he himself said, 'It is more blessed to give than to receive.'"

== See also ==
- Papyrus Oxyrhynchus 1 (the Logia Iesou)
- Agrapha
- Development of the New Testament canon
- Q document
- Aramaic primacy
- Freer logion
