= List of Gnostic texts =

Gnosticism used a number of religious texts that are preserved, in part or whole, in ancient manuscripts, or lost but mentioned critically in Patristic writings.

There is significant scholarly debate around what Gnosticism is, and therefore what qualifies as a "Gnostic text."

== Gnostic texts ==
=== Gnostic texts preserved before 1945 ===
Prior to the 1945 discovery at Nag Hammadi, only the following texts were available to students of Gnosticism. Reconstructions were attempted from the records of the heresiologists, but these were necessarily coloured by the motivation behind the source accounts.

- Works preserved by the Church:
  - Acts of Thomas (Especially Hymn of the Pearl or The Hymn of the Robe of Glory)
  - The Acts of John (Especially The Hymn of Jesus)
- The Bruce Codex (purchased in 1769 by James Bruce):
  - Books of Jeu, also known as The Gnosis of the Invisible God
  - The Untitled Text
- The Askew Codex (British Museum, bought in 1784):
  - Pistis Sophia: Books of the Savior
- The Berlin Codex or The Akhmim Codex (found in Akhmim, Egypt; bought in 1896 by Carl Reinhardt):
  - Gospel of Mary
  - Apocryphon of John
  - an epitome of the Acts of Peter
  - The Wisdom of Jesus Christ
- Unknown origin:
  - The Secret Gospel of Mark
  - The Hermetica

=== Complete list of codices found in Nag Hammadi ===
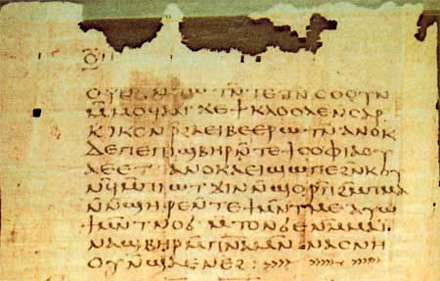
The final section of the Second Treatise of the Great Seth

- Codex I (also known as The Jung Codex):
  - The Prayer of the Apostle Paul
  - The Apocryphon of James (also known as the Secret Book of James)
  - The Gospel of Truth
  - The Treatise on the Resurrection
  - The Tripartite Tractate
- Codex II:
  - The Apocryphon of John
  - The Gospel of Thomas a sayings gospel
  - The Gospel of Philip
  - The Hypostasis of the Archons
  - On the Origin of the World
  - The Exegesis on the Soul
  - The Book of Thomas the Contender
- Codex III:
  - The Apocryphon of John
  - The Gospel of the Egyptians
  - Eugnostos the Blessed
  - The Sophia of Jesus Christ
  - The Dialogue of the Savior
- Codex IV:
  - The Apocryphon of John
  - The Gospel of the Egyptians
- Codex V:
  - Eugnostos the Blessed
  - The Apocalypse of Paul
  - The First Apocalypse of James
  - The Second Apocalypse of James
  - The Apocalypse of Adam
- Codex VI:
  - The Acts of Peter and the Twelve Apostles (includes The Hymn of the Pearl)
  - The Thunder, Perfect Mind
  - Authoritative Teaching
  - The Concept of Our Great Power
  - Republic by Plato – The original is not Gnostic, but the Nag Hammadi library version is heavily modified with then-current Gnostic concepts.
  - The Discourse on the Eighth and Ninth – a Hermetic treatise
  - The Prayer of Thanksgiving (with a hand-written note) – a Hermetic prayer
  - Asclepius 21–29 – another Hermetic treatise
- Codex VII:
  - The Paraphrase of Shem
  - The Second Treatise of the Great Seth
  - Gnostic Apocalypse of Peter
  - The Teachings of Silvanus
  - The Three Steles of Seth
- Codex VIII:
  - Zostrianos
  - The Letter of Peter to Philip
- Codex IX:
  - Melchizedek
  - The Thought of Norea
  - The Testimony of truth
- Codex X:
  - Marsanes
- Codex XI:
  - The Interpretation of Knowledge
  - A Valentinian Exposition, On the Anointing, On Baptism (A and B) and On the Eucharist (A and B)
  - Allogenes
  - Hypsiphrone
- Codex XII
  - The Sentences of Sextus
  - The Gospel of Truth
  - Fragments
- Codex XIII:
  - Trimorphic Protennoia
  - On the Origin of the World
  - Fragments

The so-called "Codex XIII" is not a codex, but rather the text of Trimorphic Protennoia, written on "eight leaves removed from a thirteenth book in late antiquity and tucked inside the front cover of the sixth." (Robinson, NHLE, p. 10) Only a few lines from the beginning of Origin of the World are discernible on the bottom of the eighth leaf.

=== Mandaean texts ===
- Ginza Rabba (The Great Treasure, also known as The Book of Adam) (DC 22)
- Qulasta (Canonical Prayerbook) (DC 53) (see also list of Qulasta prayers)
  - Sidra d-Nišmata (Book of Souls) (first part of the Qulasta)
  - ʿNiania (The Responses) (part of the Qulasta)
- Drašâ d-Jōhânā (Mandaean Book of John, also known as The Book of Kings)
- Diwan Abathur (Scroll of Abatur) (DC 8)
- Harran Gawaitha (Scroll of Great Revelation) (DC 9, 36)
- Diwan Maṣbuta d-Hibil Ziwa (The Baptism of Hibil Ziwa) (DC 35)
- Alf trisar šuialia (The 1012 Questions) (DC 36 [complete, with all 7 books], DC 6 [incomplete])
- Šarh d-qabin d-Šišlam Rabbā (The Wedding of the Great Šišlam) (DC 38)
- Šarh d-Traṣa d-Taga d-Šišlam Rabbā (The Coronation of the Great Šišlam – describes a ritual for the ordination of the Mandaean clergy)
- Asfar Malwāšē (The Book of the Zodiac) (DC 31)
- Diwan Malkuta ʿLaita (Scroll of Exalted Kingship) (DC 34)

=== Heresiography ===
- Against Heresies
- Refutation of All Heresies
- Panarion

=== Other ===
- Acts of Peter
- Clementine literature
- Odes of Solomon
- Gospel of Judas
- Gospel of the Saviour

=== Quoted or alluded ===
These texts are mentioned or partially quoted in the writings of the Church Fathers.

- Gospel of Basilides mentioned by Origen, Jerome, Ambrose, Philip of Side, and Bede.
- Basilides' Exegetica mentioned in Hippolytus of Rome (Refutatio Omnium Haeresium VII, ixv and X, x) and Clement of Alexandria (Stromata IV, xii and IV, xxiv–xxvi)
- Epiphanes' On Righteousness, mentioned in Clement of Alexandria (Str. III, ii).
- Heracleon, Fragments from his Commentary on the Gospel of John, mentioned in Origen (Commentary on the Gospel of John)
- Naassene Fragment mentioned in Hippolytus (Ref. 5.7.2–9).
- Ophite Diagrams mentioned in Celsus and Origen
- Ptolemy's Commentary on the Gospel of John Prologue, mentioned in Irenaeus.
- Ptolemy's Letter to Flora, mentioned in Epiphanius.
- Theodotus: Excerpta Ex Theodoto mentioned in Clement of Alexandria.

== Manuscripts ==
- Askew Codex contains Pistis Sophia and some other unknown texts.
- Berlin Codex, 5th century, contains a fragmentary Gospel of Mary, out of nineteen pages, pages 1–6 and 11–14 are missing entirely, the Apocryphon of John, The Sophia of Jesus Christ, and an epitome of the Act of Peter.
- Bruce Codex contains the first and second Books of Jeu and three fragments – an untitled text, an untitled hymn, and the text "On the Passage of the Soul Through the Archons of the Midst".
- Codex Tchacos, 4th century, contains the Gospel of Judas, the First Apocalypse of James, the Letter of Peter to Philip, and a fragment of Allogenes.
- Nag Hammadi library contains a large number of texts (for a complete list see the listing)
- Three Oxyrhynchus papyri contain portions of the Gospel of Thomas:
  - Oxyrhyncus 1: this is half a leaf of papyrus which contains fragments of logion 26 through 33.
  - Oxyrhyncus 654: this contains fragments of the beginning through logion 7, logion 24 and logion 36 on the flip side of a papyrus containing surveying data.
  - Oxyrhyncus 655: this contains fragments of logion 36 through logion 39 and is actually 8 fragments named a through h, whereof f and h have since been lost.

== See also ==
- General topics
  - New Testament apocrypha
  - Development of the New Testament canon
  - Pseudepigrapha
  - Gnosticism
  - Textual criticism
  - Agrapha
- Related literature
  - List of Gospels
  - Apocalyptic literature
  - Epistles
  - Acts of the Apostles (genre)
  - List of New Testament papyri
  - Hypostasis of the Archons
  - Nag Hammadi and Manichaean Studies
