= Second Apocalypse =

Second Apocalypse can refer to:

- The Second Apocalypse, a series of fantasy novels by R. Scott Bakker.
- The Second Apocalypse of James, one of the Gnostic Gospels, part of the New Testament apocrypha.
