= Nag Hammadi library =

Collection of Gnostic and Christian texts

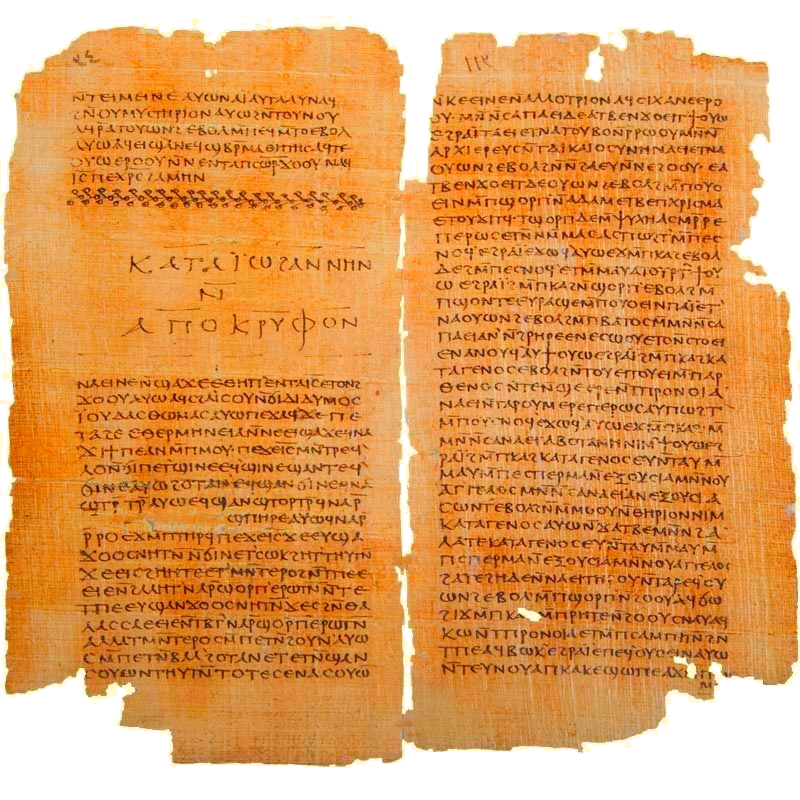
Codex II, one of the most prominent Gnostic writings found in the Nag Hammadi library. Shown here are the end of the Apocryphon of John and the beginning of the Gospel of Thomas.

The Nag Hammadi library (also known as the Chenoboskion Manuscripts and the Gnostic Gospels (Note: The texts are referred to as the "Gnostic Gospels" after Elaine Pagels' 1979 book of the same name, but the term also has a more generic meaning.)) is a collection of early Christian and Gnostic texts discovered near the Upper Egyptian town of Nag Hammadi in 1945.

Twelve leather-bound papyrus codices (and a tractate from a thirteenth) buried in a sealed jar were found by an Egyptian farmer named Muhammed al-Samman and others in late 1945. The writings in these codices comprise 52 mostly Gnostic treatises, along with three works belonging to the Corpus Hermeticum, and a partial translation/alteration of Plato's Republic. In his introduction to The Nag Hammadi Library in English, James Robinson suggests that these codices may have belonged to a nearby Pachomian monastery and were buried after Saint Athanasius condemned the use of non-canonical books in his Festal Letter of 367 A.D. The Pachomian hypothesis has been further expanded by Lundhaug & Jenott (2015, 2018) and further strengthened by Linjamaa (2024). In his 2024 book, Linjamaa argues that the Nag Hammadi library was used by a small intellectual monastic elite at a Pachomian monastery, and that they were used as a smaller part of a much wider Christian library.

The contents of the codices were written in the Coptic language. The best-known of these works is probably the Gospel of Thomas, of which the Nag Hammadi codices contain the only complete text. After the discovery, scholars recognized that fragments of these sayings attributed to Jesus appeared in manuscripts discovered at Oxyrhynchus in 1898 (P. Oxy. 1), and matching quotations were recognized in other early Christian sources. Most interpreters date the writing of the Gospel of Thomas to the second century, but based on much earlier sources. The buried manuscripts date from the 3rd and 4th centuries.

The Nag Hammadi codices are now housed in the Coptic Museum in Cairo, Egypt.

== Discovery ==
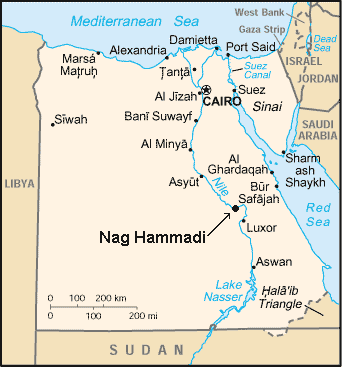
The site of discovery, Nag Hammadi in map of Egypt

Scholars first became aware of the Nag Hammadi library in 1946. Making careful inquiries from 1947–1950, Jean Doresse discovered that a local farmer, who was a teenager at the time, dug up the texts from a graveyard in the desert, located near tombs from the Sixth Dynasty of Egypt. In the 1970s, James Robinson sought out the local farmer in question, identifying him as Muhammad ‘Ali al-Samman. Al-Samman told Robinson a complex story involving a mission occasioned by a blood feud, digging to obtain fresh soil for agricultural use and thus finding the manuscripts in a buried jar, hesitating to break the jar due to superstitions about a jinn, and—at the mission's culmination—engaging in cannibalism with the target's heart. His mother claimed that she burned some of the manuscripts as tinder for the family oven; Robinson identified these with Codex XII. Robinson gave multiple accounts of this interview, with the number of people present at the discovery ranging from two to eight. Jean Doresse's account contains none of these elements.

Later scholarship has drawn attention to al-Samman's mention of a corpse and a "bed of charcoal" at the site of the putative "fresh soil" excavation—aspects of the story that were vehemently denied by al-Samman's brother. It has been suggested that the library was initially a simple grave robbing, and the more fanciful aspects of the story were concocted as a cover story. Burials of books were common in Egypt, in the early centuries AD; but if the library was a funerary deposit, it conflicts with Robinson's belief that the manuscripts were purposely hidden out of fear of persecution. Instead, Lewis & Blount (2014) have proposed that the Nag Hammadi codices had been privately commissioned by a wealthy non-monastic individual, and that the books had been buried with him as funerary prestige items. The "blood feud" story, however, has been generally accepted.

Slowly, most of the tracts came into the hands of Phokion J. Tanos, a Cypriot antiques dealer in Cairo, and they were thereafter retained by the Department of Antiquities, for fear that they would be sold out of the country. After the revolution in 1952, the texts were handed to the Coptic Museum in Cairo, and declared national property. Pahor Labib, the director of the Coptic Museum at that time, was keen to keep the manuscripts in their country of origin.

Meanwhile, a single codex had been sold in Cairo to a Belgian antiques dealer. After an attempt was made to sell the codex in both New York City and Paris, it was acquired by the Carl Gustav Jung Institute in Zurich in 1951, through the mediation of Gilles Quispel. It was intended as a birthday present for Jung; for this reason, this codex is typically known as the Jung Codex, being Codex I in the collection. Jung's death in 1961 resulted in a quarrel over the ownership of the Jung Codex; the pages were not given to the Coptic Museum in Cairo until 1975, after a first edition of the text had been published. The papyri were finally brought together in Cairo: of the 1945 find, eleven complete books and fragments of two others, 'amounting to well over 1000 written pages', are preserved there.

== Translation ==
The first edition of a text found at Nag Hammadi was from the Jung Codex, a partial translation of which appeared in Cairo in 1956, and a single extensive facsimile edition was planned. Due to the difficult political circumstances in Egypt, individual tracts followed from the Cairo and Zurich collections only slowly.

This state of affairs did not change until 1966, with the holding of the Messina Congress in Italy. At this conference, intended to allow scholars to arrive at a group consensus concerning the definition of Gnosticism, James M. Robinson assembled a group of editors and translators whose express task was to publish a bilingual edition of the Nag Hammadi codices in English, in collaboration with the Institute for Antiquity and Christianity at the Claremont Graduate University in Claremont, California, where Robinson was a faculty member.

Robinson was elected secretary of the International Committee for the Nag Hammadi Codices, which had been formed in 1970 by UNESCO and the Egyptian Ministry of Culture; it was in this capacity that he oversaw the project. A facsimile edition in twelve volumes was published between 1972 and 1977, with subsequent additions in 1979 and 1984 from the publisher Brill Publishers in Leiden, entitled, The Facsimile Edition of the Nag Hammadi Codices. This made all the texts available for all interested parties to study in some form.

At the same time, in the German Democratic Republic, a group of scholars—including Alexander Böhlig, Martin Krause and New Testament scholars Gesine Schenke, Hans-Martin Schenke and Hans-Gebhard Bethge—were preparing the first German language translation of the find. The last three scholars prepared a complete scholarly translation under the auspices of the Berlin Humboldt University, which was published in 2001.

The James M. Robinson translation was first published in 1977, with the name The Nag Hammadi Library in English, in collaboration between E.J. Brill and Harper & Row. The single-volume publication, according to Robinson, 'marked the end of one stage of Nag Hammadi scholarship and the beginning of another' (from the Preface to the third revised edition). Paperback editions followed in 1981 and 1984, from E.J. Brill and Harper, respectively. A completely revised third edition was published in 1988. This marks the final stage in the gradual dispersal of gnostic texts into the wider public arena—the full complement of codices was finally available in unadulterated form to people around the world, in a variety of languages. A cross-reference apparatus for Robinson's translation and the Biblical canon also exists.

Another English edition was published in 1987, by Yale scholar Bentley Layton, called The Gnostic Scriptures: A New Translation with Annotations (Garden City: Doubleday & Co., 1987). The volume included new translations from the Nag Hammadi Library, together with extracts from the heresiological writers, and other gnostic material. It remains, along with The Nag Hammadi Library in English, one of the more accessible volumes of translations of the Nag Hammadi find. It includes extensive historical introductions to individual gnostic groups, notes on translation, annotations to the text, and the organization of tracts into clearly defined movements.

Not all scholars agree that the entire library should be considered Gnostic. Paterson Brown has argued that the three Nag Hammadi Gospels of Thomas, Philip and Truth cannot be so labeled, since each, in his opinion, may explicitly affirm the basic reality and sanctity of incarnate life, which Gnosticism by definition considers illusory.

== List of codices and tractates ==
The following table contains a list of codices and tractates in the Nag Hammadi library as given by Aleksandr Leonovich Khosroev. Abbreviations are from The Coptic Gnostic Library.

Order of tractate	Codex number	Tractate number in the codex	Tractate title	Pages	Abbreviation	Notes
01	NHC-I (Jung Codex)	1	The Prayer of the Apostle Paul	(2)	Pr. Paul	Text rewritten on flyleaf, two lines lost, title in Greek.
02	NHC-I (Jung Codex)	2	The Apocryphon of James (The Secret Book of James)	1–16	Ap. Jas.	The title is based on the content of the text, which takes the form of a letter from James to an addressee whose name is not mentioned. Most of the text is a dialogue between Jesus and the unnamed apostles.
03	NHC-I (Jung Codex)	3	The Gospel of Truth	16–43	Gos. Truth	The title is based on the opening words of the text.
04	NHC-I (Jung Codex)	4	The Treatise on the Resurrection	43–50	Treat Res.	A treatise in the form of a letter from a teacher to a disciple, a certain Reginus, in which the addressee discusses the resurrection of Jesus Christ.
05	NHC-I (Jung Codex)	5	The Tripartite Tractate	51–140	Tri. Trac.	Title given by scholars. The treatise discusses Valentinian views on creation and cosmology.
06	NHC-II	1	The Apocryphon of John	1–32	Ap. John	A lengthy version, the first of the three versions in the Nag Hammadi library. The text is a revelation in the form of questions and answers given by Jesus to the apostle John.
07	NHC-II	2	The Gospel of Thomas	32–51	Gos. Thom.	A collection of sayings of Jesus given secretly to the apostles. Some of the sayings are known from the canonical Gospels. Greek papyri of similar content known since the beginning of the twentieth century are P.Oxy. 1, P.Oxy. 654, P.Oxy. 655.
08	NHC-II	3	The Gospel of Philip	51–86	Gos. Phil.	A Valentinian text that is a collection of discourses.
09	NHC-II	4	The Hypostasis of the Archons	86–97	Hyp. Arch.	The title is at the end of the text. The text deals with cosmology and the creation of man.
10	NHC-II	5	On the Origin of the World	97–127	Orig. World	Title given by scholars. The treatise discusses the creation of the universe and cosmology.
11	NHC-II	6	The Exegesis on the Soul	127–137	Exeg. Soul	A treatise on the fall and resurrection of the human soul that is an exegesis of Genesis 1–6. The only scriptural commentary in the library.
12	NHC-II	7	The Book of Thomas the Contender	138–145	Thom. Cont.	The title is given at the end of the text. The dialogue of the risen Jesus with Judas Thomas concerning knowledge and truth, as recorded by the apostle Matthew.
13	NHC-III	1	The Apocryphon of John	1–40	Ap. John	Short version.
14	NHC-III	2	Holy Book of the Great Invisible Spirit (The Gospel of the Egyptians)	40–69	Gos. Eg.	One of two editions of the text with the title at the end. The work begins with the phrase, "The Holy Book of the Great, Invisible Spirit." Its authorship is attributed to the biblical Seth. Contains cosmogonic and soteriological themes.
15	NHC-III	3	Eugnostos the Blessed	70–90	Eugnostos	One of two versions of the text. A treatise on the Gnostic world order in the form of a message from a teacher (Eugnostus) to his disciples.
16	NHC-III	4	The Sophia of Jesus Christ	90–119	Soph. Jes. Chr.	Revelation in the form of questions and answers given by the risen Christ to his apostles. The text is dependent on Eugnostos the Blessed. Jesus' speeches in this text are verbatim with Eugnostus' teachings given in Eugnostos the Blessed.
17	NHC-III	5	The Dialogue of the Saviour	120–149	Dial. Sav.	The title is given at the beginning and end of the treatise. The content consists of Jesus' conversations with the apostles and Mary Magdalene about the way to salvation.
18	NHC-IV	1	The Apocryphon of John	1–49	Ap. John	The second lengthy version.
19	NHC-IV	2	Holy Book of the Great Invisible Spirit (The Gospel of the Egyptians)	50–81	Gos. Eg.	Second copy of the text.
20	NHC-V	1	Eugnostos the Blessed	1–17	Eugnostos	Second copy of the text.
21	NHC-V	2	The Apocalypse of Paul	17–24	Apoc. Paul.	The text is derived from 2 Corinthians 12:2–4 and recounts the apostle Paul's journey and visions from the fourth heaven to the tenth heaven.
22	NHC-V	3	The First Apocalypse of James	24–44	1 Ap. Jas.	Dialogue about the secret teaching that Jesus taught to James, first before his death, then after his resurrection.
23	NHC-V	4	The Second Apocalypse of James	44–63	2 Ap. Jas.	The original title is the same as the previous text. The composition is complex: it includes James' speeches to the Jews about the greatness of Jesus and concludes with James' martyrdom.
24	NHC-V	5	The Apocalypse of Adam	63–85	Apoc. Adam	The revelation of the Flood and the ultimate fate of the world, which Adam received from God and passed on to his son Seth.
25	NHC-VI	1	The Acts of Peter and the Twelve Apostles	1–12	Acts Pet. 12 Apost.	The only "Acts" text in the library. An account (on behalf of the Apostle Peter) of the journey of the apostles to a certain city and their encounter with Jesus, who took the form of a jewel merchant named Lithargoel.
26	NHC-VI	2	The Thunder, Perfect Mind	13–21	Thund.	A poetic treatise. It is a self-proclamation of a female (?) deity on the non-dual, all-encompassing nature of the divine.
27	NHC-VI	3	Authoritative Teaching (Authoritative Discourse)	23–35	Auth. Teach.	A philosophical text about the fate of the soul, its origins, fall, and victory over the material world via salvation.
28	NHC-VI	4	The Concept of Our Great Power	36–48	Great Pow.	Title at the end of the treatise. Revelation of the three aeons: the material aeon, which ended with the Flood; the spiritual aeon, when the Savior appeared; and the future aeon.
29	NHC-VI	5	Fragments: 588a-589b of Plato's Republic.	48–51	Plato Rep.	A text about injustice
30	NHC-VI	6	The Discourse on the Eighth and Ninth	52–63	Dis. 8–9	Title given by scholars. Hermetic dialogue in which the teacher ("father") Hermes Trismegistus leads his disciple ("son") through the "eight" and "nine" realms of heaven.
31	NHC-VI	7	The Prayer of Thanksgiving	63–65	Pr. Thanks.	A hermetic prayer, previously known from both the Greek and Latin versions.
32	NHC-VI	8	Asclepius	65–78	Asklepius	Dialogue of Hermes Trismegistus with his disciple Asclepius. Chapters 21–29 of the lost Greek hermetic treatise known from the full Latin translation.
33	NHC-VII	1	The Paraphrase of Shem	1–49	Paraph. Shem	The title is at the beginning of the treatise. A revelation on cosmological and soteriological themes received by Shem (possibly not biblical) from Derdekeas, the son of infinite light, during the mystical separation of his mind from his body.
34	NHC-VII	2	The Second Treatise of the Great Seth	49–70	Treat. Seth	The title is at the end of the tractate. The revelation of Jesus Christ (probably identified with Seth), where he narrates his descent to earth, his death on the cross, and his return to the Pleroma.
35	NHC-VII	3	Gnostic Apocalypse of Peter	70–84	Apoc. Petr.	An account of the visions of the apostle Peter, the meaning of which Jesus revealed to him on condition that it remain secret.
36	NHC-VII	4	The Teachings of Silvanus	84–118	Teach. Silv	The only text in the library of unquestionably Christian origin. An ethical treatise in the form of the teachings of a father to his spiritual son.
37	NHC-VII	5	The Three Steles of Seth	118–127	Steles Seth	The title is at the end of the treatise. A composition in the form of hymns to higher divine entities. It begins with the title "The Revelation of Dositheos", but this name is not mentioned anywhere else in the text.
38	NHC-VIII	1	Zostrianos	1–132	Zost.	The title at the end of the treatise. Revelations received by Zostrianos from the "angel of knowledge" and an account of the hero's subsequent ascent through the heavenly realms. This is the lengthiest text in the library, and is also in very poor condition.
39	NHC-VIII	2	The Letter of Peter to Philip	132–140	Ep. Pet. Phil.	Title at the beginning of the treatise. Of the nine pages of the treatise, the epistle proper occupies only one page. The rest is part of the apocryphal acts of the apostles speaking to the risen Jesus.
40	NHC-IX	1	Melchizedek	1–27	Melch.	Title at the beginning of the treatise. A series of revelations about Jesus Christ received by the biblical Melchizedek from an angel.
41	NHC-IX	2	The Thought of Norea	27–29	Norea	One of the shortest texts in the library, with only 52 lines. The title is based on the phrase at the end of the text. A prayer, probably by a woman.
42	NHC-IX	3	The Testimony of Truth	29–74	Testim. Truth.	Title given by scholars. An address to the chosen (elect) on the essence of truth, along with a polemic against ecclesiastical Christianity.
43	NHC-X	1	Marsanes	1–68	Marsanes	The title is at the end of the text. The vision of the prophet Marsanus during his ecstatic ascent to heaven and of the essence of God.
44	NHC-XI	1	The Interpretation of Knowledge	1–21	Interp. Know.	The title is at the end of the text. An ethical sermon by a Christian Gnostic author.
45	NHC-XI	2	A Valentinian Exposition	22–40	Val. Exp.	Five fragments of a Valentinian philosophical treatise on anointing (On Anointing), baptism (On Bap. A & B), and the Eucharist (On Euch. A & B).
46	NHC-XI	3	Allogenes	40–44	Allogenes	The title is at the end of the tractate. The account of Allogenes of a revelation received from the angel Jude, and of an ascent to heavenly beings.
47	NHC-XI	4	Hypsiphrone	45–69	Hypsiph.	The title is at the beginning of the text, which is very poorly preserved. The book of visions of Hypsiphrone.
48	NHC-XII	1	The Sentences of Sextus	15–16, 27–34	Sext	A collection of wisdom sayings.
49	NHC-XII	2	The Gospel of Truth		Gos. Truth	The second copy, of which only a few fragments remain in a different dialect of Coptic.
50	NHC-XII	3	fragments		Frm.	A total of 10 pages with fragments of 15 texts have survived from the volume, of which only 2 texts have been identified.
51	NHC-XIII	1	Trimorphic Protennoia	35–50	Trim. Prot.	"Three Forms of First Thought". A treatise similar to the Apocryphon of John in many ways.
52	NHC-XIII	2	On the Origin of the World		Orig. World	Ten opening lines in the text.
	NHC-XIII		fragments			The volume contains a total of 16 heavily fragmented pages. Two texts are identified.

The so-called "Codex XIII" is not a codex, but rather the text of Trimorphic Protennoia, written on "eight leaves removed from a thirteenth book in late antiquity and tucked inside the front cover of the sixth." (Robinson, NHLE, p. 10) Only a few lines from the beginning of Origin of the World are discernible on the bottom of the eighth leaf.

== Dating ==
Although the manuscripts discovered at Nag Hammadi are generally dated to the 4th century, there is some debate regarding the original composition of the texts.

The Gospel of Thomas is held by most to be the earliest of the "gnostic" gospels composed. Scholars generally date the text to the early to mid-2nd century. The Gospel of Thomas, it is often claimed, has some gnostic elements but lacks the full gnostic cosmology. However, even the description of these elements as "gnostic" is based mainly upon the presupposition that the text as a whole is a "gnostic" gospel, and this idea itself is based upon little other than the fact that it was found along with gnostic texts at Nag Hammadi.

Further, some scholars, including Nicholas Perrin, argue that Thomas is dependent on the Diatessaron, which was composed shortly after 172 by Tatian in Syria. Others contend for an earlier date, with a minority claiming a date of perhaps 50 AD, citing a relationship to the hypothetical Q document among other reasons.

The Gospel of Truth and the teachings of the Pistis Sophia can be approximately dated to the early 2nd century as they were part of the original Valentinian school, though the gospel itself is 3rd century.

Documents with a Sethian influence (like the Gospel of Judas, or outright Sethian like Coptic Gospel of the Egyptians) can be dated substantially later than 40 and substantially earlier than 250; most scholars giving them a 2nd-century date. More conservative scholars using the traditional dating method would argue in these cases for the early 3rd century.

Some gnostic gospels (for example Trimorphic Protennoia) make use of fully developed Neoplatonism and thus need to be dated after Plotinus in the 3rd century.

== See also ==
- Apocalyptic literature
- Acts of the Apostles (genre)
- Agrapha
- Biblical archaeology
- Dead Sea Scrolls
- Development of the New Testament canon
- Dishna Papers
- Gospel of Mary
- List of Gnostic texts
- List of Gospels
- List of Mandaic manuscripts
- List of New Testament papyri
- Medinet Madi library
- Nag Hammadi and Manichaean Studies
- New Testament apocrypha
- Pseudepigrapha
- Textual criticism
