= Phokion J. Tanos =

Phokion J. Tanos (1898 – 9 February 1972), also known as Phocion Jean Tano, Phoqué J. Tano, Phokion J. Tano, was a Cypriot dealer of antiques in Cairo, who was involved in the sale of papyri belonging to the Nag Hammadi library.
