= Sophia of Jesus Christ =

Christian Gnostic text

The Sophia The Christ, also known as the Wisdom of Jesus Christ, is a Gnostic text that was first discovered in the Berlin Codex (a Codex purchased in Cairo in 1896 and given to the Berlin Museum which also contains the Gospel of Mary, the Apocryphon of John, and a summary of the Act of Peter). More famously, the Sophia of Jesus Christ is also among the many Gnostic tractates in the Nag Hammadi codices, discovered in Egypt in 1945. The Berlin-Codex manuscript (as opposed to its contents) probably dates to c. AD 400, and the Nag-Hammadi manuscript has been dated to the 300s. However, these are complemented by a few fragments in Greek dating from the 200s, indicating an earlier date for the contents.

While the title may refer to Sophia, Roel van den Broek argues that Sophia should be understood in its ordinary meaning as "wisdom", analogous to the titles Wisdom of Solomon and Wisdom of Sirach.

The text incorporates almost the entirety of the Epistle of Eugnostos, which is also found in the Nag Hammadi codices, but incorporates it into a Christian frame narrative, in which Jesus answers questions from his disciples by quoting from Eugnostos verbatim.

== Background ==
The debate about dating is critical, since some argue that it reflects the "true, recorded, sayings" of Jesus, which is possible if they were to be dated as far back as the 1st century. Others argue that they are, in fact, considerably later, and constitute an unreliable secondary source (at best post factum hearsay). Roel van den Broek argues that because the text presupposes a familiarity with gnostic myth, it is unlikely to predate the mid-second century.

Most scholars argue that the text is of Gnostic origin, based on the similarities between the mystical teachings found in the text itself and standard Gnostic themes. Highly mystical, the content of this text concerns creation of gods, angels, and the universe with an emphasis on infinite and metaphysical truth.

The perfect saviour hath said: "Come (you) from things unseen unto the end of those that are seen, and the very emanation of Thought shall reveal unto you how faith in they which are unseen was found in them which are seen, they that belong to the Unbegotten Father. Whomsoever hath ears to hear, let him hear!"

— The Sophia of Jesus Christ

The text is composed of 13 questions from the disciples, followed by brief discourses by Jesus in response.

1. The first question concerns the vanity and futility of searching for God.
2. The second concerns how to find truth, but only explaining what it is not.
3. The third concerns how truth was revealed to the gnostics at the beginning of time.
4. The fourth concerns how one must awake to see the truth.
5. The fifth concerns how things began.
6. The sixth concerns how mankind came to gnosis.
7. The seventh concerns the position of Jesus in all this.
8. The eighth concerns the identity of Jesus.
9. The ninth concerns how the spirit connects to the material.
10. The tenth concerns the number of spirits.
11. The eleventh concerns the immortal.
12. The twelfth concerns those who are not material.
13. The final question concerns where mankind came from and what purpose it should have.

== Sources ==
- van den Broek, Roelof (2013). Gnostic Religion in Antiquity. Cambridge University Press.
