= First Apocalypse of James =

Christian Gnostic text

The First Apocalypse of James is a Gnostic apocalyptic writing. Its initial rediscovery was a Coptic translation as the third tractate of Codex V in the Nag Hammadi library. Additional copies were later found in Coptic as part of the Codex Tchacos and in Greek among the Oxyrhynchus Papyri. The text uses Valentinian theologoumena, leading to the belief that the original document was written in c. 200 AD. The content of the text is a dialogue between Jesus and James the Just. The text takes a docetic view of Jesus via his statements "you are not my brother materially" and "never have I suffered in any way, nor have I been distressed." The text prepares James for his death as a martyr by emphasizing spiritual redemption over material existence.

== Summary ==
The text begins immediately with dialogue between James and Jesus. Jesus refers to himself as an image of God and explains that everything came from Him-who-is. He also speaks of femaleness and how it prepared for itself powers and gods, but it did not exist when he came forth. Jesus predicts that he will be seized the day after tomorrow, but his redemption will be near. He tells James to leave Jerusalem because it is a dwelling place of a great number of archons, and his redemption will be preserved from them. Jesus then explains the nature of the archons and the 72 heavens, which are their subordinates. He explains that Him-who-is has been given on account of them, and they are unnumbered. Jesus tells James that he will no longer be James but the One-who-is, and all those who are unnumbered will have been named when he casts away from his blind thought the bond of flesh that encircles him.

James asks Jesus how he can reach Him-who-is, given that the powers and hosts of the archons are armed against him. Jesus tells James that the powers are not armed against James specifically but against Jesus himself. Jesus expresses his concern for James, who has descended into great ignorance but has not been defiled by it, unlike those who have succumbed to it. Jesus acknowledges that he is not like them, but he has clothed himself with everything of theirs. James and Jesus discuss their respective states of mind and being, with Jesus acknowledging his faintheartedness before the anger of the archons. The text emphasizes the importance of knowledge and recollection in the pursuit of spiritual understanding and the attainment of salvation.

James expresses his fear of the powers that rule the world. Jesus reassures James that he will reveal to him his redemption and everything else, not only for James but for the sake of the faith of many people. After Jesus departs to be crucified, James suffers and is distressed until Jesus reappears to him and explains that he has not suffered and that the people have done him no harm. Jesus explains that the people exist as a type of the archons and that they deserve to be destroyed through them. Jesus warns James that he (Jesus) has stirred up great anger and wrath against himself but that it is necessary for the sake of others.

Jesus tells James that he will undergo suffering but encourages him to not be afraid. Jesus reveals to James that he (James) will be seized and face three toll collectors who take away souls by theft. Jesus instructs James to respond to their questioning by declaring himself a son of the Pre-existent Father and from the Pre-existent One. James should also acknowledge that the alien things they ask about are not entirely alien but are from Achamoth, who is the female and mistress of those things. Jesus explains that Sophia is the mother of Achamoth and the source of the imperishable knowledge that will redeem James. Jesus identifies himself and all the sons of the Pre-existent One as known by the disciples and hidden within them. Jesus instructs James to hide these things within himself and to reveal them to Addai, who will write them down and eventually pass them to Levi and his two sons.

James is reassured by Jesus that his soul will return to the Father after he is attacked by the archons. He asks about the seven women who were Jesus's disciples. Jesus discusses the spirits of thought, counsel, knowledge, and fear, and recalls a confrontation with the archon Adonaios. Jesus encourages James to cast away bitterness and lawlessness, and to beware of those who envy him. Jesus tells James to encourage Salome, Mariam, Martha, and Arsinoe. At the end of the text, James rebukes the archons before unknown speakers argue over the apparent martyrdom of James.
