= Authoritative Discourse =

Gnostic text about the soul's journey

Authoritative Discourse, also known as Authoritative Teaching or Authentikos Logos (Sahidic Coptic: ⲁⲩⲑⲉⲛⲧⲓⲕⲟⲥ ⲗⲟⲅⲟⲥ) is a text about the journey of the soul. It is the third of eight treatises in Codex VI of the Nag Hammadi library texts, taking up pages 22–35 of the codex's 78 pages. The text uses metaphors extensively to describe the origin, condition, and ultimate destiny of the soul, calling the soul a prostitute, a seed of wheat, a contestant, an invalid, a fish, and a bride. Researchers have debated whether the text should be classified as Gnostic, Christian, or both.

== History ==
The text was discovered in Nag Hammadi, Egypt in 1945 as one of the 51 total treatises transcribed into the 13 codices that make up the Nag Hammadi library. The codices had been buried around 400 AD. The writing is likely a Coptic translation of a Greek original, but there is no direct evidence in the Authoritative Discourse text because the Coptic is so fluent. Scholars disagree on the date of the original text, with a range of c. 180–400 AD.

Some of the papyrus on which the text is written has been damaged. The most significant damage is the loss of the opening lines on pages 22–28. There are gaps at the top of pages 29–30. The remaining pages are mostly intact, and the scribe's writing is easy to read.

The first scholarly translation of the text was a German translation by Martin Krause and Pahor Labib in 1971. Wolf-Peter Funk published a second German translation in 1973. Jacques Ménard published a French translation in 1977. Along with the rest of the works in the Nag Hammadi library, the text was translated into English and published in The Nag Hammadi Library in English in 1977. The publication was part of the work of the Coptic Gnostic Library Project, which began in 1966 at Claremont Graduate University. George W. MacRae translated the text to English. Marvin Meyer published a second English translation in 2007.

== Summary ==
The invisible worlds appeared, and the righteous soul came from these worlds. She could be found in either the descent or the Pleroma. Her bridegroom secretly fed the soul and rubbed her eyes with the word (logos) to open her mind. She could recognize her family and where she came from, letting go of worldly desires. In the body, the soul joined with lust, hatred, envy, and materialism. The soul chose indulgence, losing touch with her family. Her ignorance led to animal-like behavior.

Before anything came into being, the Father alone existed, preceding the heavenly and earthly worlds, principality, authority, and powers. He desired to reveal his wealth and glory, creating a contest to make contestants appear and leave behind worldly things. Those who oppose us are adversaries to be overcome through our knowledge of the Inscrutable One. Despite hunger, thirst, illness, and pain, we hold onto the strength hidden within us.

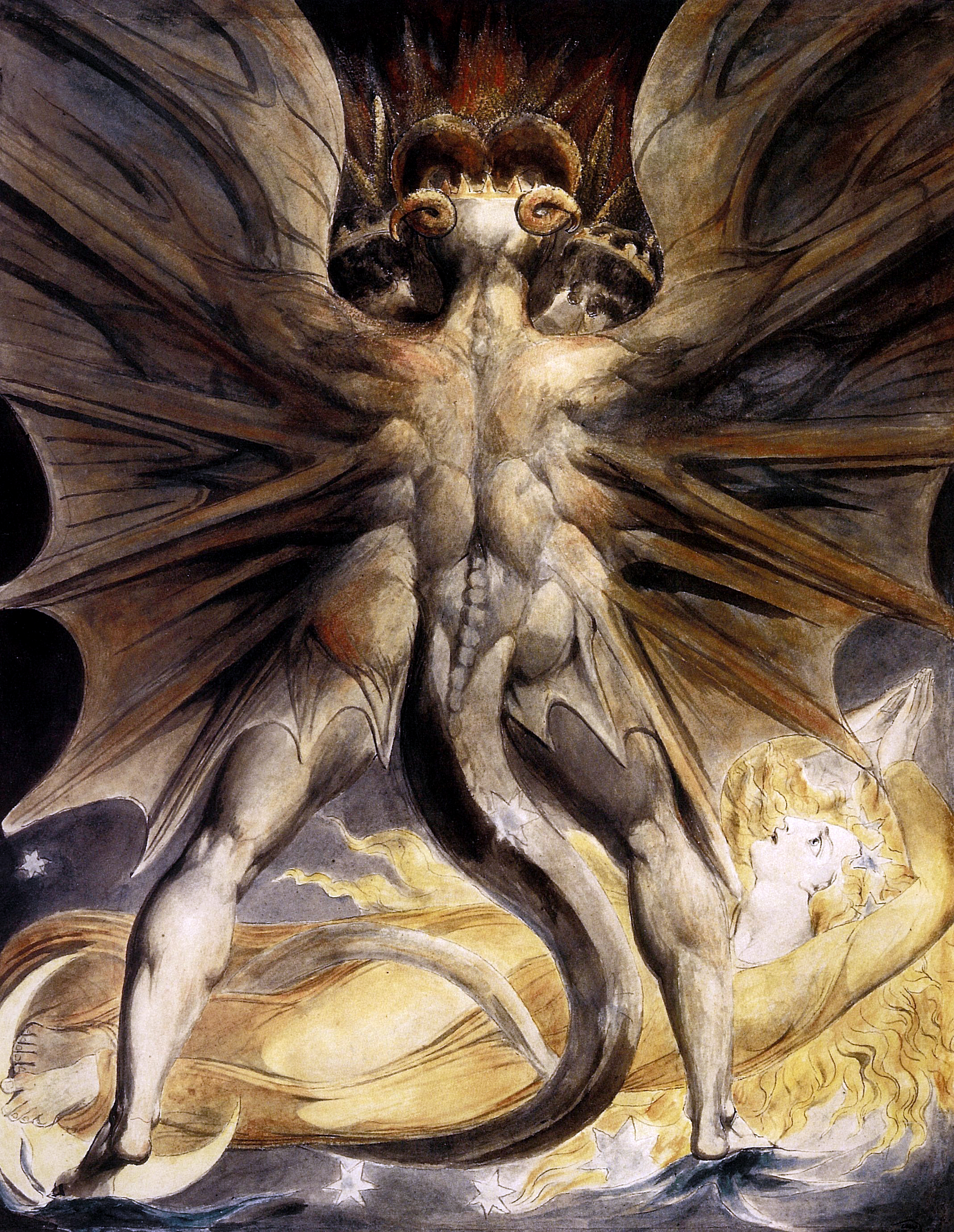
The Great Red Dragon and the Woman Clothed with the Sun (Rev. 12: 1-4) watercolor painting by William Blake

Our soul, living in a poor house, faces challenges from the material world that try to blind her. To counter these challenges, she uses the word (logos) as a medicine to open her eyes and conceal her enemies. She finds refuge in her secure treasure-house, unaffected by worldly matters. Many adversaries born within her constantly fight her day and night.

We must remain vigilant, aware of hidden nets waiting to catch us. If caught, we would be submerged in water, unable to escape. Those who prey on us rejoice, like a fisherman using bait. In this world, we are like fish, watched by the adversary who desires to swallow us. The devil presents worldly temptations to capture us, starting with small pains and desires for material things, leading to love of ignorance and ease. The adversary entices the body with pleasures, aiming to deceive the soul and draw her into ignorance.

However, the soul realizes the fleeting nature of these passions and rejects them. The soul seeks a new way of life, despising the transitory world. She embraces her true light, shedding worldly attachments, and adorning herself with a beautiful mind. She learns about her inner depth and finds solace in her shepherd's presence. Despite the scorn she faced, she receives abundant grace and glory. Those who sought to exploit her body are ashamed, unaware of her invisible spiritual nature. Her true shepherd has taught her hidden knowledge.

The ignorant ones do not seek God nor inquire about their resting place. They act in a cruel manner, worse than pagans. Pagans know and worship their idols, but they have not heard God's word. The senseless man is worse than a pagan since he has been told to seek and ask, but his hardness of heart and ignorance prevent him. However, the rational soul perseveres and learns about God. She finds what she sought and receives rest. She enjoys eternal glory and power.

== Analysis ==
Researcher Ulla Tervahauta states that although Authoritative Discourse was found among the Nag Hammadi texts, which are closely connected with Gnosticism, the writing is not easily classified as Gnostic. The text does not present a lower Creator separate from the true divinity, nor is the soul presented as disconnected from the spiritual realm. Translator George W. MacRae agrees that the text lacks a typical Gnostic cosmogony. But MacRae believes that the text is Gnostic because of its emphasis on the evil of the material world, the divine origin of the soul, and the idea of salvation through revealed knowledge. MacRae concedes, however, that the text lacks the self-assurance of unquestionably Gnostic treatises.

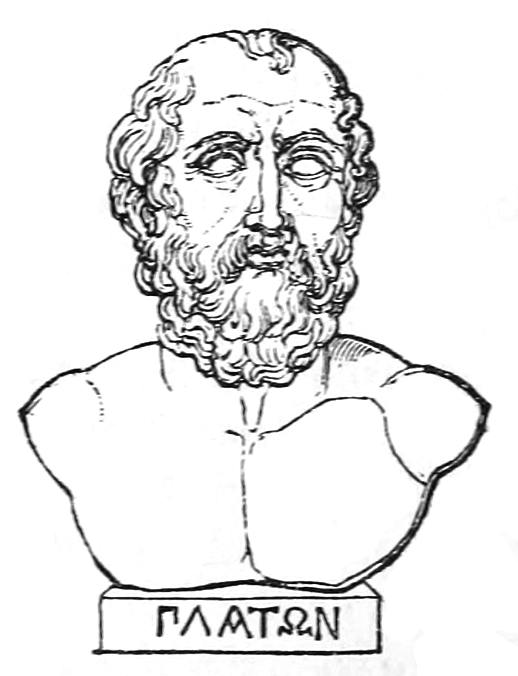
Plato illustration by William Smith

Tervahauta believes that the text should be classified as Platonic Early Christianity. Her methodology compares Authoritative Discourse with a wide variety of ancient texts rather than limiting comparisons to other Nag Hammadi texts. This broader approach reveals that the author was familiar with both New Testament and Gnostic literature and chose to produce a Christian homily.

French translator Jacques Ménard considers the text Gnostic, but this view was criticized by Egyptology professor Jan Zandee in 1978 and by religious scholar Roel van den Broek in 1979. Zandee provides counterexamples to argue that it is a work of Greek Christianity. Van den Broek argues that it is a work of Platonic Christianity from Alexandria by analyzing the Platonic terminology used to describe the soul. In particular, van den Broek argues that the text closely parallels the teachings of Porphyry and was likely written contemporaneously in the mid-third century. Tervahauta considers it Egyptian but not necessarily Alexandrian.

Historian of religion Madeleine Scopello argues in a 1988 book that the text is Gnostic. Her reasoning is that the soul, which is grammatically feminine in the text, represents the typical Gnostic thinking woman rather than a woman who is an object of desire. Tervahauta criticizes Scopello for ignoring stories of Christian women and Christian allusions in her analysis.

Professor Richard Valantasis compares asceticism in Authoritative Discourse with Roman asceticism. Valantasis concludes that monks preserved the text as secular literature that aligned with their ascetic lifestyle. Tervahauta counters that Valantasis ignores the Christian elements of the text to focus on Roman tradition.

MacRae notes the rarity of the title's lack of a grammatical article, meaning that it would be incorrect to call it The Authoritative Discourse. The untranslated title contains the word logos, which can be translated many ways depending on context, including word, discourse, teaching, reason, and account. The translation to discourse or teaching is based on Hermetica and other writings that contain logos in the title.
