= Interpretation of Knowledge =

Gnostic text

The Interpretation of Knowledge is the first tractate from Codex XI of the Nag Hammadi Library. The author emphasizes the importance of unity among members of the Gnostic community. Metaphorically, each part of the body has a specific role, and no one should be jealous or resentful of the role assigned to them. Instead, they should be grateful to belong to the body (of Christ) and have the same head. The author also emphasizes the distinction between the physical body and the spirit, stating that men of God live by the spirit and cannot be found by those who persecute them. The author further states that members of the Gnostic community, as adepts at the Word, are held to a higher standard and will be judged more harshly if they sin against it. However, if they overcome sin, they will receive a crown of victory.

== Summary ==
The text discusses the belief in the Christ and the importance of faith. The world is seen as a place of unfaith and death, and it is through faith that one can see the likeness of the Christ. The author believes that faith is a holy thing and that those with faith will be granted things to support them. The likeness of the Christ is apprehended by means of his trace, and God apprehends through his members. The Savior is seen as an emanation of the trace and is loved by the Virgin. The Virgin is seen as the Womb and is fixed to the cross, and it is her water that is the water of immortality. The author mentions that some fell in the path, others in rocks, others in thorns, and others in the shadow. The author describes the eternal reality as the one before the souls come forth from those who are being killed.

Jesus was crucified by the Church, but his death was not deserved as he did not commit any sins. The Church imprisoned him in a fabricated body and compelled him to serve their energies. Jesus taught the Church to remove themselves from the surfeits of the world and to follow his teachings. He made himself the teacher of immortality and encouraged the Church to not call to any earthly father but to the one true Father in heaven. Jesus' teachings emphasize the importance of the soul over worldly gains and the dangers of ignorance and sin.

The text describes the faith laid down by the master who rescued the reader from ignorance and darkness. The master taught the reader about the good things of the Father and race and advised not to esteem the worldly form as advantageous. The master himself became small through humility so that he could elevate the reader to the great height. The reader is encouraged to believe in the master and enter through the rib from which they came to escape the beasts. The world is said to be from beasts and is a punishment, and the lost are counted with the beasts. The man who was reproached changed his name and appeared as flesh, but he has his own glory with the name, which is the Son. Through him, the reader can receive the forgiveness of sins and grace.

Continuing, the text describes the role of the emanation of the name in redeeming the one who was reproached. It explains that the flesh is an Aeon that Wisdom has emitted and that the Aeon entered the one who was reproached so that they might escape the disgrace of the flesh. The text also mentions the way in which the cross became the head and how the decree will be fulfilled, giving birth to an offspring that will receive a perfect body and become complete through the presence of the Son of God. The great Son, sent by the Father, proclaimed the edict of the Father, forgiving sins and redeeming those who had been enslaved in Adam. The Christ removed himself from all these and loves his members with all his heart.

The writing stresses the importance of love and gratitude towards one's fellow brothers and sisters in the faith. It encourages the sharing of gifts and talents without jealousy and to recognize the grace that dwells within each person. The author states that the Word is rich and generous, giving gifts to everyone without jealousy. The members of the faith should work together, and if one suffers, they should all suffer together, and if one is saved, they are all saved together. The author cautions against ignorance and jealousy towards one's brothers and sisters and encourages love and reconciliation with the grace of the Head.

The work concludes with discussion of the reconciliation and unity of members within the Body of Christ. Each member has a unique role, and they should not be jealous or despise each other. The text emphasizes that everyone has the potential to sin, but if they overcome their sin and purify themselves, they will receive a crown of victory, just as Christ was glorified by the Father. The text also criticizes those who persecute members of the Church, as they are senselessly mad and cannot find true spiritual fulfillment. The text emphasizes that members of the Church should strive to live by the Spirit and avoid sin, as they will be held to a higher standard than those outside the Church.
