= Dialogue of the Saviour =

Christian Gnostic text

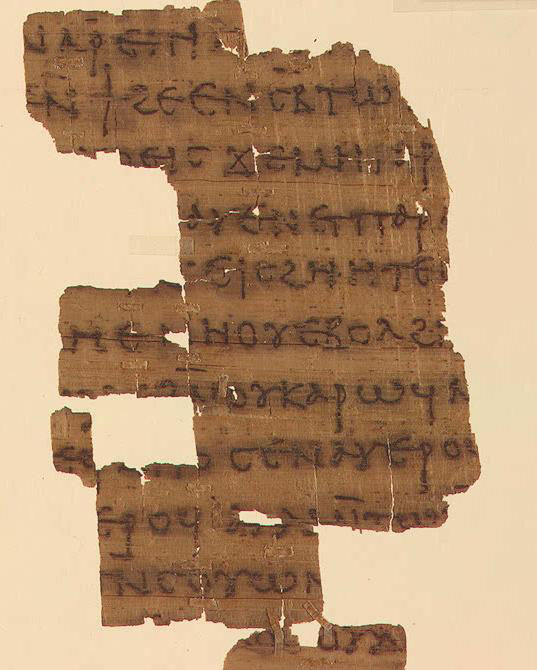
Yale Papyrus Fragment from the Nag Hammadi Gnostic Library Codex III, containing The Dialogue of the Savior.

The Dialogue of the Saviour is a Gnostic Christian writing. It is the fifth tractate in Codex III of Nag Hammadi library. The only existing copy, written in Coptic, is fragmentary. Its final form was likely completed c. 150 AD. The textual style resembles other Gnostic dialogues between the Savior and the disciples, such as the Gospel of Thomas, but lacks a literary framework, has dramatic episodes interspersed, and includes eschatology. This style may be the result of a combination of "at least four different written sources.". Unlike many other Gnostic texts, Dialogue attributes the creation of the world to a benevolent Father rather than an evil or flawed Demiurge.

== Summary ==
The Savior instructs his disciples to abandon their labor and stand at rest to achieve eternal rest. He encourages them to praise the Father and to repent, since the Father is the thinking and entire serenity of the solitary. The Savior also warns his disciples about the power of fear and the time of dissolution, which they should not be afraid of but should pass by with a single mind. He assures them that those who seek and reveal the truth will be received, and their works will not be destroyed. The Savior also emphasizes the importance of setting things in order in the mind to achieve luminosity in the body.

Mary Magdalene, Judas, Matthew, and the Lord are conversing. The Lord speaks about the nature of darkness and light, the origin of the universe, the power of the mind and the spirit, and the importance of seeking the truth. The Lord emphasizes the need to have a place in the heart to receive knowledge and suggests that seeing the place of pure light is not possible while still carrying the physical body. Instead, the Lord suggests that knowing oneself and doing good works can lead to understanding and connection with the place of life.

Judas asks the Lord about the force that supports the earth and heavens, and the Lord explains that it is the First Word that established the cosmos. The text also emphasizes the importance of understanding the root of all things, including the work of perfection, fire, water, wind, and the body. The Son of Man explains that a deficient seed from a power went down to the abyss but was brought up to the Greatness by the Word. The disciples are amazed at these teachings and offer praise to the Lord. The Lord describes a vision that can be seen through a transient or eternal perspective, with the emphasis on seeking and speaking from within to be in harmony with the living God. The Lord emphasizes the importance of ridding oneself of jealousy and abandoning burdensome works in order to enter the bridal chamber and find rest. The conversation also reveals that what is born of truth does not die and that the place where the Lord is not is lacking truth.

Mary expresses her desire to understand all things, and the Lord emphasizes the importance of seeking life rather than the material wealth of the world. The disciples ask how to ensure their work is perfect, and the Lord advises them to be prepared and find inner peace. Judas asks about the beginning of the path, and the Lord says it is rooted in love and goodness. Matthew questions the end of everything, and the Lord tells him that understanding and acceptance of his teachings are necessary. The disciples inquire about the place they are going, and the Lord encourages them to focus on the present moment. Mary speaks of the mystery of truth and their taking a stand in it. The Lord emphasizes the importance of stripping oneself of transient things and following the path of truth to achieve spiritual purity. The ending optimistically describes the dissolution of "the works of womanhood," meaning the end of fleshly existence via childbirth and a return to the light.
