= Gospel of Truth =

Gnostic text from the New Testament apocrypha

The Gospel of the Truth (Coptic: ⲡⲉⲩⲁⲅⲅⲉⲗⲓⲟⲛ ⲛ̄ⲧⲙⲏⲉ, romanized: p-euaggelion n-tmēe) is one of the Gnostic texts from the New Testament apocrypha found in the Nag Hammadi codices ("NHC"). It exists in two Coptic translations, a Subakhmimic rendition surviving almost in full in the first Nag Hammadi codex (the "Jung Codex") and a Sahidic in fragments in the twelfth codex.

== History ==
The Gospel of Truth is not titled, but the name for the work comes from the first three words of the text. It may have been written in Greek between 140 and 180 by Valentinian Gnostics (or, as some posit, by Valentinus himself). It was known to Irenaeus of Lyons, who objected to its Gnostic content and declared it heresy. Irenaeus declares it one of the works of the disciples of "Valentinus", and the similarity of the work to others thought to be by Valentinus and his followers has made many scholars agree.

But the followers of Valentinus, putting away all fear, bring forward their own compositions and boast that they have more Gospels than really exist. Indeed their audacity has gone so far that they entitle their recent composition the Gospel of Truth, though it agrees in nothing with the Gospels of the apostles, and so no Gospel of theirs is free from blasphemy. For if what they produce is the Gospel of Truth, and is different from those the apostles handed down to us, those who care to can learn how it can be shown from the Scriptures themselves that [then] what is handed down from the apostles is not the Gospel of Truth.

Other scholars have argued for a fourth century composition for the book we now have.

After its Coptic translations and their burial, the text had been lost until the Nag Hammadi discovery.

== Style ==
The text is written with strong poetic skill (notable even in translation), and includes a heavily cyclical presentation of themes. It is not a "gospel" in the sense of an account of the works of Jesus of Nazareth, but is better understood as a homily. The text is generally considered by scholars one of the best written texts in the whole Nag Hammadi collection, considering its worth highly as both a great literary work and a gnostic exegesis on several gospels, canonical and otherwise. The ideas expressed deviate from the views of Valentinian gnosticism.

The writing is thought to cite or allude to the New Testament Gospels of Matthew and John, as well as 1 and 2 Corinthians, Galatians, Ephesians, Colossians, Hebrews, 1 John and the Book of Revelation. It cites John's Gospel the most often. It is also influenced by the Gospel of Thomas; for instance at one point (22:13-19) it cites John 3:8 alongside Thomas 28.

== Content ==
The text says that ignorance caused the formation of the world by the aeons. It then describes Jesus as having been sent down by God to remove ignorance from humans and the aeons, to perfect them and restore union with the Father and correct the error that was the creation of the world. Jesus was a teacher confounding the other scribes and teachers, and asserted they were foolish since they tried to understand the world by analyzing the law. But Error grew angry at this, and nailed Jesus to a cross. It also proceeds to describe how it is knowledge of the father that grants salvation, which constitutes eternal rest, describing ignorance as a nightmare.

Having next described the parable of the good shepherd in an esoteric manner, it then describes how feeding the hungry and giving rest to the weary is to be understood as feeding spiritual hunger, and resting the world weary.

This is followed by a parable about anointing, the meaning of which is obscure, but may be connected with the way in which a sealed amphora meant it was full, a metaphor for knowledge − having the final "seal" in the jigsaw and one understands, but without it, the scraps of understanding that one has put together can still be easily undone:

But those whom he has anointed are the ones who have become perfect. For full jars are the ones that are usually anointed. But when the anointing of one (jar) is dissolved, it is emptied, and the reason for there being a deficiency is the thing by which its ointment goes. For at that time a breath draws it, a thing in the power of that which is with it. But from him who has no deficiency, no seal is removed, nor is anything emptied, but what he lacks, the perfect Father fills again.

Aside from a final description of achieving rest by gnosis, the remainder of the text concerns a treatise on the connection between the relationship between the Son and the Father, and the relationship of a name to its owner. The prime example of this is the phrase it uses that the name of the Father is the Son, which is to be understood in the esoteric manner that the Son is the name, rather than as meaning that Son was a name for the Father.

Unlike the canonical gospels, this gospel does not contain an account of Jesus' life or teaching. It does contain insights concerning the resurrected Jesus' 40-day ministry.

This gospel, like some other gnostic texts, can be interpreted as proclaiming predestination. One section states:

Those whose name he knew in advance were called at the end, so that one who has knowledge is the one whose name the Father has uttered. For he whose name has not been spoken is ignorant. Indeed, how is one to hear, if his name has not been called?

Having knowledge, he does the will of the one who called him, he wishes to be pleasing to him, he receives rest. Each one's name comes to him. He who is to have knowledge in this manner knows where he comes from and where he is going.

== Relation to Valentinian fragments ==
Layton printed eight fragments of Valentinian literature, each being a quote which at least one of the Church Fathers claimed to take from the Valentinian corpus although none from the "Gospel of Truth". Layton further noted where the excerpts agree with one another.

"Fragment G", which Clement of Alexandria (Stromateis 6.52.3-4) related to "On Friends", asserts that there is shared matter between Gnostic Christian material, and material found in "publicly available books"; which is the result of "the law that is written in the [human] heart". Layton relates this to GTr 19.34 − when Jesus taught, "in their hearts appeared the living book of the living, which is written in the Father's thought and intellect". Both rely on a shared concept of pre-existent yet obscured knowledge, which emanated from the Father of the Gnostics.

"Fragment F" also comes from the Stromateis, 4.89.1-3. Directed to the Gnostics, it calls the congregation "children of eternal life" and hopes that they will "nullify the world without being yourselves nullified". Layton relates the former to GTr 43.22 at the end of the work, which emphasises that the Gnostics are the Father's children and will live eternally. Layton relates the latter to GTr 24.20, which proposes to "nullify the realm of appearance" and then explains this as the world that lacks the Father.

The concept that fear and the lack of knowledge are connected is evident;

Having entered into the empty territory of fears, he (Jesus) passed before those who were stripped by forgetfulness, being both knowledge and perfection, proclaiming the things that are in the heart of the Father, so that he became the wisdom of those who have received instruction.

There is also the mentioning of an awakening brought about through the acquiring of knowledge, and the dismissal of that which is not real, namely fear. Fear is not real because it does not come from the Father. That which is not light is not from the Father, such as a tree only brings forth one fruit, the Father's only fruit is light.

The level to which these writings express the power of the "self" in the coming of knowledge, and the conflict of the innate perception that the average person is too weak, too full of misconceptions to be able to lift themselves up is addressed. The theme of the Gospels is that Christ saves only those whom the Father gives to him. The average person is not poor in spirit, but haughty, and therefore too weak to save himself without the sacrifice of God on our behalf.

== Editions ==
=== English translations ===
- Grant, Robert McQueen (1961). "The Gospel of Truth". Gnosticism: A source book of heretical writings from the early Christian period. New York: Harper & Brothers. Republished in Barnstone, Willis (1984). The Other Bible. San Francisco: Harper & Row. ISBN 978-0-06-250031-1.
- Attridge, Harold W.; MacRae, George W. (1988). "The Gospel of Truth (I,3 and XII,2)". In Robinson, James M. (ed.). The Nag Hammadi Library in English. Brill. pp. 38–51.
- Brown, Paterson (2003) [1992], Gospel of Truth, archived from the original on 2003-10-30
- Barnstone, Willis; Meyer, Marvin (2009). "The Gospel of Truth". In Barnstone, Willis (ed.). The Gnostic Bible. Boston: Shambhala. ISBN 978-1-59030-631-4. OCLC 191922827.
- Meyer, M.W. (2010). "The Gospel of Truth". In Meyer, M.W. (ed.). The Nag Hammadi Scriptures: The Revised and Updated Translation of Sacred Gnostic Texts Complete in One Volume. HarperOne. pp. 36ff. ISBN 978-0-06-204636-9.
- Mattison, Mark M. (2020) [2017], The Gospel of Truth: A Public Domain Transcription and Translation (Coptic and English)

== See also ==
- List of gospels
