= Bentley Layton =

American educator (1941–2025)

- Born: August 12, 1941
- Died: March 26, 2025 (aged 83); New Haven, Connecticut, U.S.
- Occupation: Educator

Bentley Layton (August 12, 1941 – March 26, 2025) was an American educator who was professor of religious studies (Ancient Christianity) and professor of Near Eastern Languages and Civilizations (Coptic) at Yale University.

== Early life ==
Bentley Layton was born on August 12, 1941, to Nelly Gray (née Oldman) and Reber B. Layton. His father was a teacher, principal and writer. Layton grew up in Jackson, Mississippi. He graduated summa cum laude from Harvard University in 1963 with a Bachelor of Arts. He was a member of the Harvard Society of Fellows. He later graduated with a PhD from Harvard in religion in 1971.

== Career ==
In 1971, Layton began teaching early Christian literature at École Biblique in Jerusalem. He taught there for five years before joining the department of religious studies at Yale University in 1976. He was a fellow of Saybrook College. He was Goff Professor Emeritus of Religious studies and professor of Near Eastern languages and civilizations at Yale. He studied gnostic texts at Nag Hammadi and the writing of the Egyptian monk Shenoute of Atripe. His studies were central to the late 20th-century Rediscovery of Gnosticism, which was the title of the international conference he hosted at Yale in 1980 and the volume that came of it. His interests lay in the history of Christianity from its origins until the rise of Islam, Gnostic studies and Coptic.

His book The Gnostic Scriptures: A New Translation with Annotations (Garden City: Doubleday & Co., 1987), which presents some of the enigmatic literature of gnostic Christianity for nonspecialists. He sets his selection of gnostic scripture, the writings of Valentinus and his followers, and related writings that display gnostic tendencies within the broader context of Early Christianity and Hellenistic Judaism. For specialists, Layton's Coptic Grammar is a standard text. He catalogued all the Coptic manuscripts in the British Library. He was a board member on the Harvard Theological Review and the Journal of Coptic Studies.

== Personal life and death ==
Layton was a member of Christ Church in New Haven. He died from complications of Parkinson's disease at his home in New Haven, on March 26, 2025, at the age of 83. He was buried at Christ Church.

== Works ==
- The Hypostasis of the Archons, Or, The Reality of the Rulers..., serialized in Harvard Theological Review 67 (1974) 351—425 and 69 (1976) 1—71
- thesis on the Nag Hammadi Gnostic Coptic Treatise on the Resurrection (1978)
- Co-author, Bluebirds: Their Daily Lives and How to Attract and Raise Bluebirds (1986)
- The Gnostic Scriptures (1987)
- Catalogue of Coptic Literary Manuscripts in the British Library Acquired since the Year 1906 (1987)
- Coptic Grammar (2004)
- The Canons of Our Fathers: Monastic Rules of Shenoute (2014)
