= Paraphrase of Shem =

Gnostic text

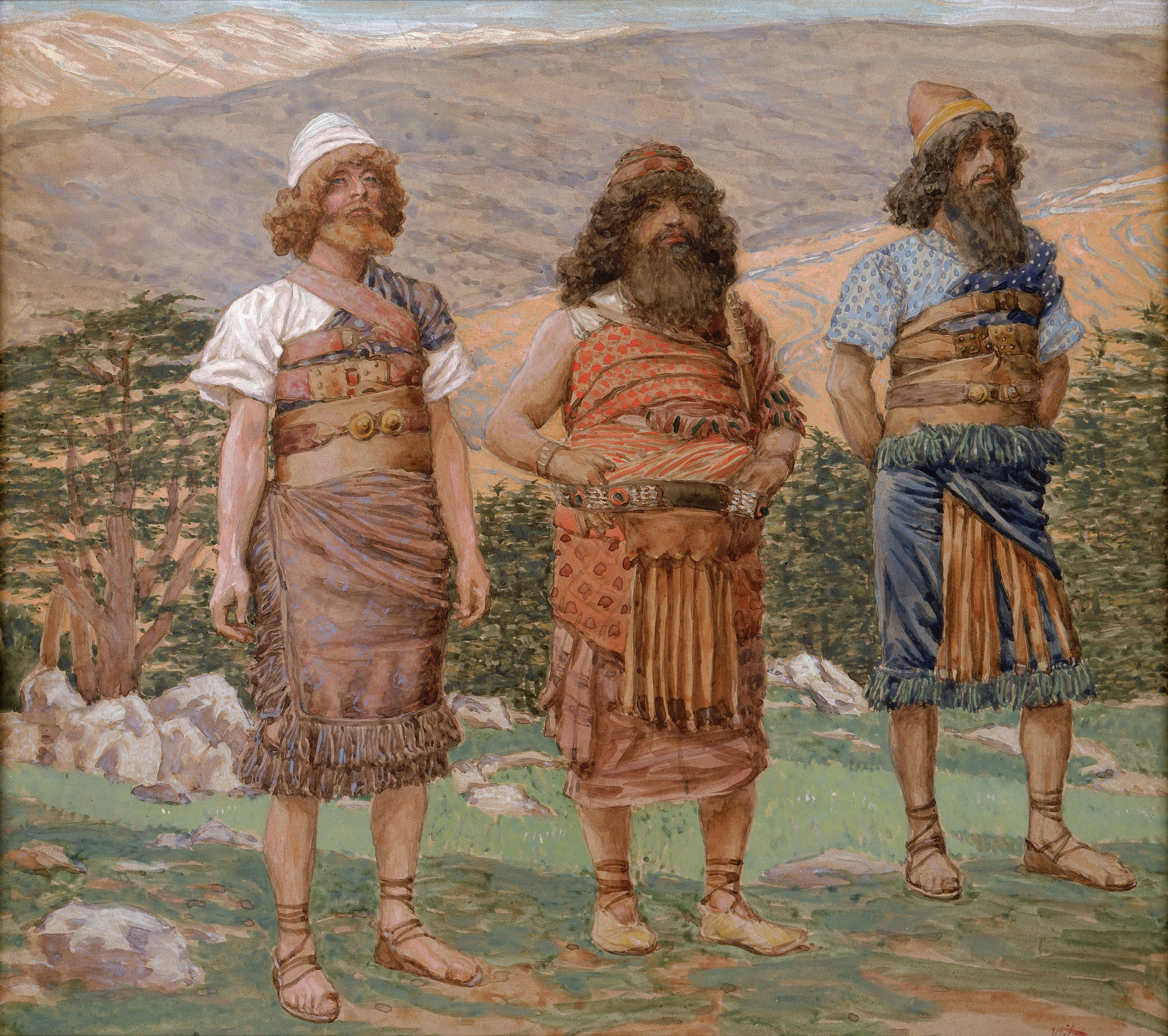
Left to right: Shem, Ham, and Japheth—the three sons of Noah

The Paraphrase of Shem is a Gnostic text. It is the first tractate in Codex VII of the Nag Hammadi library. The Coptic manuscript is notable for being one of the best preserved tractates despite its length and for its absence of Christian influence. The text likely was written in Syria in c. 200 AD. It discusses cosmogony, soteriology, and eschatology.

== Summary ==
Shem's mind is taken to the top of the world and encounters a voice, named Derdekeas (Aramaic for "boy"), that explains the truth about the powers of light, darkness, and spirit. The light overcame the darkness, and the spirit appeared as a gentle light. The darkness took the form of the mind of evil but was later overcome by the appearance of the son of the infinite light. The son of the infinite light appeared in the likeness of the spirit, causing the darkness to become dark to itself and ultimately resulting in the creation of the womb. The darkness and the womb became unchaste, causing the mind to dissolve into the depths of nature and mix with the power of darkness. Nature took the mind and gave it shape, but the spirit of light was burdened by it. Derdekeas prayed to the infinite light and the power of the spirit was increased and filled with its light. The light of the infinite spirit came down to expose the darkness and protect the spirit from the harmful waters, but its light was not equal to the majesty.

Derdekeas is a son of majesty who was revealed to bring light to the spirit and prevent nature from ruling over it. He appeared in a cloud of the hymen and gave eternal honor to the members of the darkness so they wouldn't engage in impure activities. This caused the light to shine without deficiency. Derdekeas then took off his garment of light and put on another garment of fire to go down to chaos to save the light. He had a sexual encounter with nature, causing many animals to come out of her. The son appeared in animal form to request the creation of heaven and earth, leading to the creation of nature. He commands nature to give birth, resulting in the production of winds, demons, and powers from the fire, darkness, and spirit. The winds copulate and give birth to all kinds of unchastity, producing barren wives and sterile husbands, but the son puts the demons to shame and gives the mind a likeness of fire, light, and attentiveness.

Demons brought the flood and the Tower of Babel, and the image of the spirit appeared in the earth and water due to their actions. Derdekeas reveals that the soul is a burden to darkness and a work of unchastity to the thought of light. To fulfill the sin of nature, the womb was made pleasant, but the demon was sent to plot with the water of darkness and cause a flood to take the light away from faith. The Tower of Babel was built to protect the demon from the turbulent chaos, and the darkness was disturbed by its loss. Derdekeas tells Shem to return to his race and faith and reveals that the disturbance that happened was so that nature might become empty, and the wrath of the darkness subsided. The mouth of darkness was shut, and nature cast forth the power of fire, which resulted in the creation of beasts and human beings. Derdekeas teaches Shem about the blindness that protects his race and states that the righteous one will shine upon the world once all has been revealed.

Derdekeas speaks to Shem about the city of Sodom and the coming of faith. He warns Shem to protect the insight he will be given and to quickly proclaim the universal teaching to the Sodomites. The demon of human form will depart from Sodom, but it will be burned unjustly. The demon will appear in the four regions of the world, causing evil passions, earthquakes, wars, famines, and blasphemy. The other demon, Soldas, will appear on the river and trouble the world with an imperfect baptism. Derdekeas says that he must appear in the members of faith to reveal the great things of his power and separate the light from the demon. He will mix the light with his invincible garment and reveal himself in the darkness for the sake of Shem and his race, who will be protected from evil darkness.

Derdekeas instructs Shem about how to pass through the wicked region. He says that he has taken the light of the spirit from the frightful water. Derdekeas instructs Shem to consider himself pleasing in the thought of light and not to have dealings with the fire and body of darkness, which was an unclean work. Derdekeas speaks about the significance of remembering the firmament where the race is protected. He speaks a poetic litany that includes names and attributes of different spiritual entities, both good and evil. He gives a blessing to Shem and the people of the spirit, who will remember the light and avoid the impurities of the dark wind. Derdekeas also talks about the difficulty of completing the spiritual journey while wearing a body, and how only a small number of people with the mind and thought of the light of the spirit will be able to do so. He says that those who do not share the spirit and faith will dissolve in the darkness. Derdekeas claims that he has opened the eternal gates and granted perception to those who are worthy, but that the wrath of the world and the forces of darkness will rise against him.

Derdekeas warns against the dangers of impure baptism. He says that many people who wear the erring flesh will be led astray and bound by the water, which is an insignificant body and a source of many sins. Derdekeas believes that true salvation can only be achieved through contemplation of the spirit and refraining from impure baptism. He also mentions the story of Rebouel, who was beheaded for being the support of the demon. Derdekeas instructs Shem to proceed with faith and to reveal the truth to the world.

Shem returns from the journey and receives the power of light. Shem then walks in faith and the righteous follow him, and all the things the light told him would happen on earth happen. However, nature is burdened and troubled, and only the mind who was entrusted with the likeness of the forms of the womb can open them. People with a free conscience can remove themselves from nature's chaos and be accepted by Shem's garments. After Shem leaves the earth, a great evil error will come upon the world, bringing many evils and evil times. A demon will come up from the power of fire and divide the heaven, and a wind from his mouth with a female likeness will reign over the world. At the end, nature will have a final opportunity, and the stars will cease from the sky. The mouth of error will be opened, and the forms of nature will be destroyed with the winds and all their demons. The sweet waters will perish, and all the forms of nature will cease from the middle region.

Shem has completed his journey and separated his mind from the body of darkness. He repeats the litany spoken by Derdekeas about various spiritual beings and powers and acknowledges the impure light and root of evil represented by Moluchtha and Essoch. Shem also speaks of the power of grace and faith and the importance of guarding oneself against the heritage of death. He encourages others to go in grace and continue in faith, and notes that every power of light and fire will be revealed through his testimony. Shem also mentions that when he is no longer on earth, the powers will be given to the worthy ones.
