= Concept of Our Great Power =

Apocalyptic text from the Nag Hammadi library

Concept of Our Great Power refers to writing 28 of codex VI of the Nag Hammadi library. The manuscript is dated from within approximately the middle of the fourth century CE. The apocalyptic text focuses on events such as the creation, actions of the Redeemer and the Antichrist, and the last triumph of the highest Power. It speaks of a great Power that can make a person invisible and immune to fire. The text also discusses the roles of different aeons. The author urges people to wake up from their dreamlike state and return to the true food and "water of life." The text also mentions a man (Jesus) who will come into being and know the great Power and speak in parables. This man will open the gates of heaven with his words and raise the dead. The conclusion describes the end of the earthly kingdom and the cleansing of the souls. The wickedness of the world is stronger than the forces of good, but the righteous will be protected by a divine power and enter into an immeasurable light. Fire will consume all evil, and the firmaments will fall. The souls that are being punished will be released and come to purity.

== Summary ==
The text opens by discussing the idea of a great Power that makes one invisible and protects from fire. The text emphasizes the importance of knowing this power and being able to distinguish it from other things. The author mentions the spirit and the role it plays in giving life to people. The text also mentions the origin of the creation and the desire of the powers to see the image of the great Power.

The writing speaks of the work of the Power that came into being and mentions the story of Noah and the flood. It also discusses the psychic aeon that is mixed with bodies and the negative qualities it brings such as wrath, envy, malice, and disease. The text calls for people to awaken and turn from evil desires and heresies. It also mentions the mother of fire who brought the fire upon the soul and earth, destroying all dwellings and eventually destroying herself. The fire will continue to burn until all wickedness is cleansed.

A man (Jesus) is said to come into being who knows the great Power. He will receive the knowledge and drink from the milk of the mother. He will speak in parables and proclaim the aeon to come, just as Noah spoke in the first aeon. He will speak in 72 tongues and open the gates of heaven with his words, defeating the ruler of Hades. The archons, however, will raise their wrath against him and deliver him up to the ruler of Hades, who will find that the nature of the man's flesh cannot be seized. This is seen as a sign of the dissolution of the archons and the change of the aeon. Many will follow him, write down his words, and become blessed, having found rest in the heavens.

The text continues discussing the coming of a man who knows the great Power and proclaims the second aeon. The archons become angry and try to seize him, but he is victorious over them. The text then goes on to describe the events that follow, including the rise of wickedness, the archons sending an imitator (the Antichrist), and the child growing up and performing great signs. The text predicts that those who follow this man will introduce circumcision and turn away from the great Power. The text also mentions that many preachers have been sent beforehand to preach on behalf of the man who performs great signs.

It concludes by describing a time of judgment and purification, in which wickedness will be cleansed and the souls of the righteous will enter into a state of light and immortality. The period of judgment is said to last 1460 years, after which all things will come to an end and the souls of the righteous will find rest in the Power who is above all powers. The souls who are being punished will cry out for mercy, and they will eventually come to purity and be released.

== Bibliography ==
- Williams, Francis (2001). Mental perception a commentary on NHC VI, 4, the concept of our Great Power. Leiden: Brill. ISBN 978-90-04-43991-7. OCLC 1202055257.
