= Book of Thomas the Contender =

Gnostic dialogue

The Book of Thomas the Contender or The Book of Thomas is a Gnostic revelation dialogue. It is the seventh tractate in Codex II of the Nag Hammadi library. The tractate is a Coptic translation of a Greek original, likely composed in Syria during the early 200s AD. The dialogue is between Jesus and Judas Thomas, whom Jesus calls "my twin" and "my brother." Scholars disagree on whether Judas Thomas is Thomas the Apostle, Jude the Apostle, and/or Jude, brother of Jesus. Judas is one of the brothers of Jesus named in Mark 6:3, and Thomas is Aramaic for 'twin.' The ending of the text is a monologue delivered by Jesus.

== Summary ==
The text is introduced as secret words written down by Mathaias while listening to Jesus speaking with Judas Thomas. Jesus tells Thomas to listen because Jesus will reveal to Thomas the things he has pondered in his mind. Jesus urges Thomas to examine himself and learn who he is and how he will come to be, since it is not fitting for him to be ignorant of himself. Jesus emphasizes that one who has not known himself has known nothing, and only one who has known himself has already achieved knowledge about the depth of the all. Thomas then asks Jesus to tell him about the hidden things, but Jesus asks him if visible things are already difficult for him, how can he hear about the invisible things? Jesus says that Thomas and others are still apprentices and have not yet received the height of perfection.

Thomas asks Jesus about invisible things. Jesus explains that visible bodies change and perish since they are bestial, and their formations will also perish. Thomas compares those who speak of invisible things to archers shooting at night. Jesus says that light exists in light. Thomas asks why visible light rises and sets. Jesus explains that the light shines on behalf of humans, and when all abandon bestiality, it will withdraw up to its essence. Jesus describes the unsearchable love of light and the bitterness of the fire that blazes in humans, making their minds and souls deranged, and advises fleeing visible spirits.

Jesus says that observing his teachings and gaining wisdom is necessary to become perfect. The wise are those who seek the truth and rest upon it forever. Jesus quotes Psalm 1:3, saying the wise man "will be like a tree growing by the meandering stream." Jesus warns against being attracted to visible things that will decay and change and says that these things will imprison people with fragrant pleasure, leading them according to the fire's desire. He says it is good to rest forever with the truth, since things visible among men will dissolve, and those who do not love truth first will perish in the concern for this life and the scorching of the fire.

Thomas asks what to say to those who claim they came to do good but still know iniquity because they were begotten in flesh. Jesus describes them as beasts who love the sweetness of fire and are deprived of the kingdom. They will be thrown down to the abyss and afflicted with the torment of their evil nature. Thomas asks what will happen to those who fight against them, and Jesus says they will dissolve in fire and water, hide in tombs of darkness, and be punished by beasts and men. Thomas accepts what Jesus says but worries that the preachers of his words will be ridiculed. Jesus warns that those who turn away from his words will be cast down to the abyss and imprisoned in a narrow dark place, pursued by fiery scourges.

At the end of the text, Jesus speaks a series of woes to those who rely on things that will not happen; hope in the flesh and in the prison that will perish, hope on the world, and hope that this life is God, is corrupting their soul. He speaks of the fire that burns within them, the wheel that turns in their minds, and the grip of the burning that will devour their flesh and rend their souls, preparing them for their companions. Jesus also speaks of the captivity of those who are bound in caverns and dwell in darkness and death while being drunk with the fire and full of bitterness. He goes on to speak of the blessed, who have prior knowledge of the stumbling blocks, who flee alien things, and who are reviled and not esteemed on account of the love their lord has for them. He urges them to watch and pray, to come forth from the bondage of the bitterness of this life and find rest, for they have left behind the suffering and the disgrace, and will reign with the king forever.

The colophon appended to the text is The Book of Thomas The Contender Writing To the Perfect.
