= Teachings of Silvanus =

Christian text from the Nag Hammadi library

The Teachings of Silvanus is the fourth tractate in Codex VII of the Nag Hammadi library. The Coptic translation dates to c. 350 AD, but the original Greek version was likely written near Alexandria between c. 200 and the early 300s AD. The text is pseudepigrapha attributed to Silas (Silvanus), a companion of Paul in Acts of the Apostles. Scholars typically consider it not Gnostic, but J. L. Sumney argues that it is a Gnostic work. It is a rare example of an early Christian Wisdom text and was used in monastic circles. The content of the text encourages the reader to seek wisdom and knowledge, embrace Christ as the King and Teacher, and to cast out any negative influences. God and Christ are described as divine, with Christ being an emanation of God's power, wisdom, and life. The text instructs the reader to fear God, glorify Him through good works, and be pure.

== Summary ==
The opening urges the reader to develop strength of mind and soul and to fight against negative emotions. Silvanus emphasizes the importance of guarding one's thoughts and using reason and the mind as guides, and he warns against showing weakness to enemies, preferring to pursue enemies with strength instead. He also stresses the significance of education and knowledge, encouraging the reader to listen to wisdom and seek knowledge and perception. He contrasts the foolish person who is guided by ignorance and evil with the wise person who seeks wisdom and reason. The reader is advised to cast their anxieties on God and to avoid ignorance, desire, and evil counsels.

Silvanus encourages the reader to return to their divine nature and to reject evil influences by embracing Christ as a good teacher and turning away from death. He emphasizes the importance of taking care of the divine within, which consists of the body, soul, and mind and warns against mixing these components. He advises the reader to live according to the mind and not the flesh, and to be cautious against evil thoughts and influences of the Adversary, who may come in the guise of a flatterer and deceive with sins disguised as good things. Silvanus also encourages people to turn towards their rational and human nature, rather than their animal or fleshly side, and to be in agreement with both the intelligence of the snake and the innocence of the dove.

The text focuses on the importance of accepting Christ as the king who is forever invincible and can set one free. It emphasizes that it is not wise to trust anyone in this world, since everyone is deceitful, and everything in the world is happening in vain. Silvanus suggests entrusting oneself to God alone and living with Christ, who is the true light and sun of life. The text also discusses the nature of God and the mind, stating that the mind, with respect to actual being, is in the body but with respect to thought, it is not in a place and that God does not exist in a place and is impossible to comprehend the likeness of the Creator of all creatures. It is stated that God is in every place and in no place at the same time and that it is possible to know God a little through his power that fills every place. The text warns against speaking or confining God to mental images and advises to ask quietly and reverently.

Silvanus focuses on the importance of gaining spiritual enlightenment and understanding through seeking the light of heaven. The reader is encouraged to examine themselves, avoid wickedness, and cast off old sinful desires. They are advised to be humble, contrite, and vigilant in order to protect their newfound spiritual enlightenment. The text warns against the dangers of fornication and letting the soul become a place for negative forces. Christ is presented as the Tree of Life and Wisdom who can make the foolish wise. The reader is encouraged to entrust themselves to reason, remove themselves from animalistic behavior, find joy in the True Vine of Christ, and nourish their reasoning powers. The text warns against the dangers of sin and negative forces and urges the reader to use reasoning to conquer them and become a true human being.

The text focuses on the importance of following God and avoiding anything that goes against God's teachings. The reader is advised to let Christ enter their life and cast out any negative influences, so they can become pure and close to God. Christ is described as God and Teacher who became man to help humanity and has the power to defeat evil and bring salvation. The greatness of God and Christ as the divine Word is emphasized, with Christ being an emanation of the pure glory of God, the light from the power of God, an image of God's goodness, an incomprehensible Word, Wisdom, and Life. He is also described as giving life to all living things, ruling with power, being the beginning and end of everyone, and rejoicing over those who are pure.

The conclusion emphasizes the importance of being vigilant to avoid falling into the hands of robbers. It encourages the reader to fight the good fight and overcome the powers that fight against them, with the help of their judge who wants them to be victorious. The reader is instructed to fear God, glorify Him through good works, and to understand that anyone who is not pleasing to God is the son of perdition and will go to the underworld. The text highlights God's patience, love, and knowledge of all things, including the hidden things of the heart. It also highlights the difficulty of understanding and knowing God and Christ and instructs the reader to prepare themselves for escape from worldly powers, purify themselves inwardly and outwardly, and accept the wisdom of Christ and guard it. The ending states that God's way is always profitable.
