= Sentences of Sextus =

2nd-century collection of maxims

The Sentences of Sextus, also called the Sayings of Sextus, is a Hellenistic Pythagorean collection of maxims which was popular among Christians and translated into several languages. The identity of the Sextus who originated the collection is unknown.

== Transmission ==
The Sentences was probably compiled in the second century AD. The original collection was pagan. It was later modified to reflect a Christian viewpoint, although there are no explicit references to Jesus.

The earliest mention of the Sentences is by Origen in the mid third century. Origen quotes Sextus on self-castration, a widespread habit among ascetic early Christians, which Origen deplores, and mentions in passing that the work is one "that many considered to be tested by time."

A Latin translation was made from the original Greek by Rufinus of Aquileia under the title Anulus around 400. A partial Coptic translation was discovered in one of the books of the New Testament apocrypha recovered from the Nag Hammadi library in 1945. A Syriac translation is also known, its title translates Dicta Selecta Sancti Xysti Episcopi Romani ('select sayings of Saint Xystus, Roman bishop').

== Authorship ==
The identity of Sextus has been disputed for a long time. The identification with Pope Xystus II (r. 256–258), current by the time of the Latin and Syriac translations, is denied by Jerome, who calls the author Sextus Pythagoreus. Such attributions to important figures, which happened frequently, were usually attempts to give the works more authority.

One possible author of the Sentences is Quintus Sextius, a Roman philosopher who combined Stoicism with Pythagoreanism, and who lived in the 1st century BC.

== Contents ==
The work is similar to the sayings gospels called the Gospel of Phillip and the Gospel of Thomas in that it is purely a collection of sayings, with no bridging framework. Unlike the Christian sayings gospels, the wisdom comes from a man named Sextus rather than Jesus. Sextus appears to have been a Pythagorean. There are 451 sentences. Some are:

- The soul is illuminated by the recollection of deity
- Bear that which is necessary, as it is necessary
- Be not anxious to please the multitude
- Esteem nothing so precious, which a bad man may take from you
- Use lying like poison
- Guard yourself from lying. (Because when you lie) there is a deceiver and the deceived.
- Nothing is so peculiar to wisdom as truth
- Wish that you may be able to benefit your enemies
- A wise intellect is the mirror of God
- Cast away any part of the body that would cause you not to live abstinently. For it is better to live abstinently without this part than ruinously with it. (quoted by Origen)

== Bibliography ==
- Wilson, Walter T. 2012. The Sentences of Sextus. (Wisdom Literature from the Ancient World 1.) Atlanta: Society of Biblical Literature. [Text and commentary]
- Chadwick, Henry, ed. (2003). The Sentences of Sextus. Cambridge University Press. ISBN 9780521541084.
- Domach, Zachary M. (2013). Tempered in the Christian Fire (PDF). Emory University. Archived from the original (PDF) on 2015-04-02.
