= Hypsiphrone =

Hypsiphrone is Codex XI, Tractate 4 of the Nag Hammadi writings, named from the translation of a Greek feminine name word 'Hypsiphrone' or 'Hupsiph[rone]' rendered as she of high mind. The text is highly fragmentary, and only parts of several paragraphs have survived.

== Summary ==
The text describes a conversation between Hypsiphrone and her brethren Phainops. Hypsiphrone has returned to the world after being in the place of her virginity, and Phainops asks why she has left and suggests she follow him. Phainops then tells Hypsiphrone about a fount of blood that can be revealed by starting a fire.

== Interpretation and scholarship ==
Although the meaning of the text is obscure due to its fragmentary state, it has attracted scholarly attention for its unusual feminine protagonist and its Gnostic symbolism. Elaine Pagels and Charles Hedrick provide a translation and introduction in Nag Hammadi Codices XI, XII, XIII, suggesting the work may allude to spiritual transition or initiation rites. Combs (Grace Theological Journal) discusses the tractate's relevance for understanding Gnostic views on salvation and spiritual knowledge.

== Preservation ==
Hypsiphrone is one of the lesser-known texts from the Nag Hammadi library. Its high degree of fragmentation has limited both lay and scholarly interpretation. However, existing references and secondary literature provide a basis for further analysis, and additional comparative studies with other Nag Hammadi texts have been encouraged.
