= Prayer of the Apostle Paul =

New Testament apocryphal work

The Prayer of the Apostle Paul is a New Testament apocryphal work, the first manuscript from the Jung Codex (Codex I) of the Nag Hammadi Library. Written on the inner flyleaf of the codex, the prayer seems to have been added after the longer tractates had been copied. Although the text, like the rest of the codices, is written in Coptic, the title is written in Greek, which was the original language of the text. The manuscript is missing approximately two lines at the beginning.

== Authorship and Composition ==
Like other early Christian writings, the author of this prayer identifies themself with the historic Apostle Paul to give authority to the text. Consequently, the prayer is widely understood to be a pseudepigraphical work. Because the prayer lacks its opening lines, it is unclear whether there was a title at its beginning. However, a title written in Greek is preserved at the bottom of the treatise, reading "Prayer of the Apostle Paul" and followed by a colophon. The colophon, also written in Greek, states "In Peace. Holy is Christ." The prayer in its entirety was likely written in Greek and translated into Coptic.

== Content ==
The prayer shows a distinctive Gnostic tone. It begins with a series of invocations addressed to the Redeemer. The term, with numerous meanings in both the Jewish Scriptures and the New Testament, has varied potential implications. The Redeemer is understood to be God in the Book of Job, just as he is known as the "Redeemer of Israel" in the Book of Isaiah. By contrast, in Paul's Letter to the Romans, Jesus is the Redeemer. In 3:24-25, Paul writes that believers "are now justified by his grace as a gift, through the redemption that is in Christ Jesus, whom God put forward as a sacrifice of atonement by his blood"—in essence, redemption is the saving nature of Jesus' death. The Redeemer might also be understood as the supreme, hidden God of the Gnostic belief system.

Whomever the prayer intends to address, the author employs the formula "you are" four times to characterize the Redeemer as mind, treasury, fullness or pleroma, and repose. With the exception of the word "treasury"—translated into Coptic as aho, the terms remain in Greek as nous, pleroma, and anapausis, respectively. Although these terms are frequent in Valentinian literature, they are also found elsewhere.

Many scholars have dubbed it as a Valentinian work due to characteristic phrases such as the "psychic God"—this would indicate that it was composed between 150 and 300 AD; if it is not of Valentinian origin it could date from as early as 75.

== Parallels to other works ==
Scholars have found parallels to many other works which may be partial sources, including Corpus Hermeticum, the Three Steles of Seth, the Gospel of Philip, and the authentic Pauline letters.
