= Epistle of Eugnostos =

Gnostic text from the Nag Hammadi library

The Epistle of Eugnostos or Eugnostos the Blessed is a Gnostic epistle found in Codices III and V of the Nag Hammadi library. Both copies seem to be a Coptic translation of a Greek original that was composed in Egypt around the late 1st century; the copy from Codex III is the earlier translation. Scholars note that the text is interrelated with The Sophia of Jesus Christ, which adds more specifically Christian elements to the cosmology-focused Epistle. The text is a philosophical discourse on the nature of God and the world. The author asserts that previous human inquiries have failed to reach the truth about the nature of God, who is ineffable and beyond human understanding. The author describes a belief system in which there is an Immortal Man who reveals various aeons and powers with different names and authorities over different kingdoms and worlds.

== Summary ==
The author, Eugnostos (meaning "well-known" in Greek), greets his readers and asserts that all human beings born until now have failed to understand the true nature of God through their inquiries and speculations. He then describes the ineffable God as being beyond the grasp of human understanding, with no birth, no name, no form, and no ruler. This God is the perfect and unchanging source of all things, and the difference between the perishable and the imperishable. Belief in the words he has written about the true God can be attained only by going from what is hidden to what is visible, and that this thought will lead to faith in the invisible.

The author describes the Lord of the Universe as the "Forefather" rather than the "Father." The Lord sees himself within himself, like a mirror, and he appeared as a self-begotten and self-fathering entity. He revealed many other confronting, self-begotten entities who are equal in age and power and called "Sons of Unbegotten Father." The Unknowable is full of imperishableness and ineffable joy, and the First who appeared before the universe in infinity is the Self-grown, Self-constructed Father, full of shining, ineffable light. The First created the Immortal Androgynous Man, who is the source of divinity and kingdom. He is called the "God of gods" and the "King of kings."

The text discusses the attributes of the First Man, who is known as "Faith." He is described as having a unique mind and thought that reflects and considers rationality and power. There is a difference between the attributes of First Man and the other immortals in terms of power, but they are all equal in terms of imperishability. The First Man is also described as being composed of a monad, dyad, triad, and so on, and each attribute has a specific role and hierarchy within the kingdom of First Man. After First Man, another principle came from him, called the "Self-perfected Begetter." When he received the consent of his consort, Great Sophia, he revealed the first-begotten androgyne, called the "First-begotten Son of God." This androgyne has his own authority and created a multitude of angels, called the "Assembly of the Holy Ones". The kingdom of the First-begotten Son of God is full of ineffable joy and unchanging jubilation.

The son of man, known as "Savior," consented with his consort Sophia and revealed an androgynous light. Six androgynous spiritual beings were then revealed with male and female names. From their consenting, thoughts appeared, leading to the creation of the world and its elements including time, the year, months, days, and hours. The 12 powers then consented with each other, leading to the creation of 72 heavens and 360 firmaments. The aeons are described in detail, with the first being that of Immortal Man, the second being that of First Begetter, and the highest being the aeon of the Eternal Infinite God. The creation of these aeons leads to the appearance of defect in the world.

The conclusion describes a belief system in which there is an Immortal Man who reveals various aeons and powers with different names, such as Unity and Rest, Assembly, and Life. These aeons and powers have authority over different kingdoms and worlds, and they each provide great kingdoms with hosts of angels and other spirits. The aeons are completed with their heavens and firmaments for the glory of Immortal Man and Sophia, his consort. All natures from the Immortal One to the revelation of chaos are in the light, and they are filled with ineffable joy and unutterable jubilation. The ending states that this is enough for now, and that a person who needs not be taught will appear and speak these things with pure knowledge and joy.

== Realms ==
The text lists five different beings with their own realms (aeons), each with their own angels and deities. The text lists a chain of beings rather than emanations as in many of the other Sethian Gnostic texts in the Nag Hammadi library.

1. realm of the unbegotten or unconceived Father
2. realm of the Human Father, by himself
3. realm of immortal Humanity
4. realm of the Child of Humanity, called the first one to conceive
5. realm of the Savior (the offspring of the Child of Humanity)

The Savior came together with his companion Pistis Sophia to produce six androgynous spiritual beings that have both male and female names:

male names	female names
unconceived	all-wise Sophia
self-conceived	all-mother Sophia
one who conceives	all-conceiving Sophia
first to conceive	first-conceiving Sophia
all-conceiving	love Sophia
chief creator	Pistis Sophia

== Manichaean influence ==
On the basis of strong similarities found with texts from the Manichaean Medinet Madi library, Falkenberg (2018) demonstrates that Eugnostos contains strong Manichaean influences. The vocabulary, cosmology, and lists of emanations and limbs used in Eugnostos, some of which are also present in the Sophia of Jesus Christ, resemble their Manichaean counterparts in many ways.
