= Valentinian Exposition =

Gnostic text

A Valentinian Exposition is the second tractate from Codex XI of the Nag Hammadi Library. Less than half of the text has been preserved. The text explores the relationship between God, the created world, and humanity. It states that the material world is a shadow of the spiritual world and that humanity is a mixture of spiritual and carnal elements. The Demiurge, a lower deity, is responsible for creating the physical world and humanity, and the Devil, who is one of the divine beings, expelled his root from the body of humanity and caused the world to fall into sin. It also explores themes such as salvation through knowledge and understanding of one's true identity.

== Summary ==
The text discusses God and his creation. It mentions the Father, the Root of All, who dwells alone in silence, possessing everything within him. The Son is described as God's Thought and Mind of the All, stemming from the Root of the All. The Son is also the Father of the All, the projector of everything and the hypostasis of the Father. The text invites the reader to enter the revelation, goodness, and descent of the All, which is the Son, to experience God's greatness.

God is the First Father and is revealed in Monogenes (Christ), who is the Mind of the All and the Truth. Limit separates the All and confirms it. Monogenes has four powers: separator, confirmor, form-provider, and substance-producer. The Gnostics believe in seeking after scriptures and those who know the concepts, which were proclaimed by God. They believe it is important to seek this knowledge and understand God's unfathomable richness.

The Tetrad consists of Word, Life, Man, and Church. This Tetrad was created by the Uncreated One and each element represents a different aspect of divinity. The Decad from Word and Life and the Dodecad from Man and Church form the Pleroma of the year, representing perfection. However, Sophia, being a syzygy of Man and Church, desired to surpass the Triacontad and bring the Pleroma to herself. This caused her son (the Demiurge) to descend and suffer, being detained by Limit (the syzygy). Sophia then repented and asked the Father of Truth for forgiveness for renouncing her consort and bearing the passions she suffers. She realizes her previous state in the Pleroma and what has become of her.

Jesus and Sophia revealed the creature. Jesus made the creature from the seeds of Sophia and worked from the passions surrounding the seeds, separating the better passions into the spirit and the worse ones into the carnal. Pronoia caused the correction of these passions and projected shadows and images of those who exist, which is the dispensation of believing in Jesus. After Jesus brought forth the angels and the Pleroma, he brought forth the Tetrad of the world, which put forth fruit and entered images, likenesses, angels, and other beings. The will of the Father is always to produce and bear fruit, so it was not the will of the Father that Sophia should suffer.

The Demiurge created a man based on his own image and likeness, and the Spirit of God breathed into them. The struggle between the Devil and God took place and resulted in the angels' lusting after the daughters of men, leading to a flood. The complete syzygy glorifies Sophia and Truth, and the glory of the seeds and Jesus are of Silence and Monogenes. When Sophia, Jesus, and the angels receive the Christ, the Pleroma will be in unity and reconciliation, increasing the Aeons.

== Valentinian Liturgical Readings ==
Five short texts immediately follow Valentinian Exposition in Codex XI:

On the Anointing is a prayer asking for the anointing of the Son of God, Jesus Christ, to protect and empower the reader to overcome the power of the Devil. The text glorifies the Father, who is present in the Son, the Holy Church, and the holy angels. The prayer also mentions the perpetuity of the Aeons, which are forever until the untraceable Aeons of the Aeons.

On the Baptism A is a summary of knowledge revealed by Jesus Christ and provides the necessary items for walking in them. The first baptism is the forgiveness of sins and a pattern of the baptism of the Christ. The interpretation of John is the Aeon, and the upward progression is the Exodus from the world into the Aeon.

On the Baptism B speaks about the change brought about by baptism. It mentions moving from the physical world into spiritual and angelic states, from created into the Pleroma, and from being entangled to being connected to one another. It also mentions that through baptism, the soul becomes a perfect spirit and the things granted by the first baptism are now invisible. The text mentions that Christ rescued those who are in him through his Spirit and the souls will become perfect spirits.

On the Eucharist A expresses gratitude to the Father and celebrates the Eucharist. It mentions the Son, Jesus Christ, and recognizes his love and the knowledge he brings. The text also mentions the importance of following the will of the Father through the name of Jesus Christ and being complete in every spiritual gift and purity. The text ends with a prayer of glory to the Father through the Son, Jesus Christ, now and forever.

On the Eucharist B expresses gratitude to the Father and mentions the Holy One and the Son. It talks about food and drink in relation to the Son, and says that the church is pure. It says that by dying purely, one can be pure and have access to food and drink, and concludes by giving glory to the Father forever.
