= Treatise on the Resurrection =

Early Christian Gnostic text

The Treatise on the Resurrection is an ancient Gnostic or quasi-Gnostic Christian text which was found at Nag Hammadi, Egypt. It is also sometimes referred to as "The Letter to Rheginos" because it is a letter responding to questions about the resurrection posed by Rheginos, who may have been a non-Gnostic Christian.

== Background ==
The main message of the treatise is that Christians should consider themselves already resurrected in a spiritual sense and that the resurrection is real, not just a metaphor. It asserts that Jesus "lived as flesh" and was "both human and divine." These statements imply that the author rejected docetism, an idea frequently found among the Gnostics. The text also says that Jesus "displayed himself as the Son of God."

== The Treatise ==
Aside from these more orthodox characteristics, the text is otherwise Gnostic since it embraces typical Gnostic themes, such as the restoration of the pleroma, multiple divinities, aeons, predestination, and respect for Paul, whom it calls "The Apostle." As such, the text may have come from a quasi-Gnostic school which retained more orthodox interpretations concerning the nature of Christ.

The text is noticeably Christian in tone and is Jesus-centric to a greater degree than other texts found at Nag Hammadi. It alludes to the account of the Transfiguration found in the Gospel of Mark, saying, "Do you remember reading in the Gospel how Elijah and Moses appeared?" Hence, the text indicates that the author accepted Mark's synoptic gospel narrative as sacred.

Unlike many other texts found at Nag Hammadi, The Treatise on the Resurrection is not pseudepigraphical since the author does not pretend to be an apostolic figure who received a special revelation. The text is simply a letter to someone named Rheginos. It belongs to a genre more akin to the New Testament letters than the apocryphon typical of Gnostic pseudepigrapha.

The treatise contains a mix of proto-orthodox and gnostic views. This mixture is apparent in an excerpt regarding who Jesus was and his purpose. The excerpt states: "Now the Son of God, Rheginos, was Son of Man. He embraced them both, possessing the humanity and the divinity, so that on the one hand, he might vanquish death through his being Son of God, and that on the other, through the Son of Man, the restoration to the Pleroma might occur; because he was originally from above, a seed of the Truth because this structure (of the cosmos) had come into being. In this (structure), many dominions and divinities came into existence."

The concept that Jesus was both divine and human was part of the proto-orthodox view. However, the belief in the existence of many divinities and the Pleroma were both gnostic views that proto-orthodox Christians rejected. Accordingly, the idea that Jesus's purpose was to restore the Pleroma was also a gnostic belief.

The author also asserts that this world is an illusion and instructs Rheginos not to "live in conformity with the flesh" because the goal of gnostic Christians is to be "released from this Element" (i.e., released from the material world).

The letter also contains statements that indicate that the author believed in predestination. One excerpt states, "Therefore, we are elected to salvation and redemption since we are predestined from the beginning not to fall into the foolishness of those who are without knowledge, but we shall enter into the wisdom of those who have known the Truth." This excerpt also emphasizes the importance of knowledge for salvation, which is also a gnostic view.

== Dating and authorship ==
There is general agreement that the extant Coptic text can be dated to the fourth century before it was hidden in response to Athanasius’s 39th festal letter in 367 CE, which defined the scope of the New Testament. The original Greek treatise is usually taken to have been written in the second half of the second century, likely by a leader in the Valentinian movement. There is, however, debate over the date of composition.

Early scholars Puech and Quispel (1963) argued for Valentinus's mid-second-century date (150 CE) and authorship. They reasoned that the abundance of New Testament content in the treatise indicates the author's possession of a collection of materials that became available after the first quarter of the second century. As the Church developed orthodox and heterodox positions during this time, the treatise arose from emerging heretical views. W. C. Van Unnik (1963) supposed an uncertain second-century date but suggested that the early-Church context led to the treatise's more orthodox view of the resurrection than other Gnostic texts. Malcolm Peel (1969) and Bentley Layton (1989), who wrote his doctoral dissertation at Harvard University about the text, suggest a late second-century date. While not impossible, the suggestion of authorship by Valentinus himself has fallen out of favor.

Arguing for a much later, fourth-century date, Edwards (1995) suggests that the combination of orthodox and heterodox elements in the text reflects a later, more developed Valentinianism that sought unity after the Arian controversy in the mid-fourth century. However, Craig (2012) notes that this fourth-century date leaves little room for the original Greek manuscript to circulate and be translated before being hidden around 367 CE. She finds it is for that reason, given the Pauline tendencies already present in earlier Valentinianism, and the arguments of Puech, Quispel and Van Unnik, that the second-century date is generally preferred.
