= Rylands Papyri =

Collection of ancient papyrus fragments

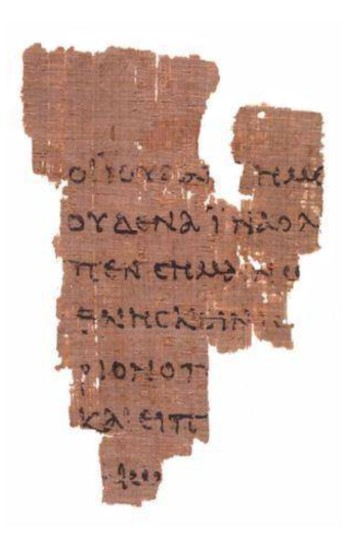
Rylands Library Papyrus P52, recto, part of the Rylands Papyri

The Rylands Papyri are a collection of thousands of papyrus fragments and documents from Egypt and Greece housed at the John Rylands University Library, Manchester, UK. The collection, purchased by Bernard Pyne Grenfell in Egypt in 1920, includes the Rylands Library Papyrus P52, also known as the "St John's fragment", a fragment from a papyrus codex, generally accepted as the earliest extant record of a Canonical gospel.

== The collection ==
The Rylands Papyri collection held by the John Rylands University Library, is one of the most extensive and wide-ranging papyrus manuscript collections in the United Kingdom. It includes religious, devotional, literary and administrative texts. The collection includes 7 hieroglyphic and 19 hieratic papyri which are funerary documents dating from the 14th century BCE to the 2nd century CE. It also holds 166 demotic papyri, mostly dating from the Ptolemaic period, including the famous Petition of Petiese (pRylands 9) from the reign of Darius I of Persia.

The collection also houses about 500 Coptic papyri, and around 800 Arabic papyri consisting of private letters, together with tradesmen's and household accounts. Among the roughly 2,000 Greek papyri are the famous fragments of the Gospel of John and Deuteronomy, the earliest surviving fragments of the New Testament and the Septuagint (Papyrus 957, the Rylands Papyrus iii.458) respectively; Papyrus 31, a fragment of a papyrus manuscript of the Epistle to the Romans; and Papyrus 32, a fragment of the Epistle to Titus. Also held in the collection is Papyrus Rylands 463, a copy of the apocryphal Gospel of Mary in Greek, and John Rylands Papyrus 470, a prayer in Koine Greek to the Theotokos, written between 3rd to 9th centuries in brown ink, the earliest known copy of such a prayer. It was acquired by the Library in 1917.

== Volumes ==
- Crum, W.E. (1909), Catalogue of the Coptic Manuscripts in the Collection of the John Rylands Library, Manchester. (P.Ryl.Copt.)
- Griffith, F.Ll. (1909), Catalogue of the Demotic Papyri in the John Rylands Library, Manchester. (P.Ryl.Dem.)
  - Volume I: Atlas of Facsimiles.
  - Volume II: Hand-copies of the earlier documents.
  - Volume III: Key-list, Translations, Commentaries and Indices.
- Hunt, A.S. (1911), Catalogue of the Greek and Latin Papyri in the John Rylands Library, Manchester. Volume I: Literary Texts, Manchester. (P.Ryl. I)
- Johnson, J. de M.; Martin, V.; Hunt, A.S. (1915), Catalogue of the Greek and Latin Papyri in the John Rylands Library, Manchester. Volume II: Documents of the Ptolemaic and Roman Periods, Manchester. (P.Ryl. II)
- Roberts, C.H. (1938), Catalogue of the Greek and Latin Papyri in the John Rylands Library, Manchester. Volume III: Theological and Literary Texts, Manchester (P.Ryl. III)
- Roberts, C.H.; Turner, E.G. (1938), Catalogue of the Greek and Latin Papyri in the John Rylands Library, Manchester. Volume IV: Documents of the Ptolemaic, Roman and Byzantine Periods, Manchester. (P.Ryl. IV)

== See also ==
- John Rylands Library
- P.Ryl. I 4 (p^{4} on the list Gregory-Aland) — fragment of the Epistle to the Romans in Greek;
- P. Ryl. I 5 (p^{5} on the list Gregory-Aland) — fragment of the Epistle to Titus in Greek;
- P.Ryl. III 457 (p^{52} on the list Gregory-Aland) — fragment of the Gospel of John in Greek; 2nd century;
- P.Ryl. III 458 — fragments of the Book of Deuteronomy in Greek; 2nd century BC;
- P.Ryl. III 463 — Greek manuscript of the apocryphal Gospel of Mary; 3rd century
- Manchester Odyssey (P. Ryl. Gr. I 53) - Greek manuscript of the oldest surviving codex of The Odyssey
