= Names for Jewish and Christian holy books =

Judeo-Christian scripture

This article distinguishes the various terms used to describe Jewish and Christian scripture. Several terms refer to the same material, although sometimes rearranged.

== Judaism ==
The Hebrew Bible comprises the Torah (the five books of Moses), the Neviim (the books of the Prophets), and the Ketuvim (the "Writings"). The Hebrew Bible is also known as the Tanakh, an acronym from the initial Hebrew letters of these three words; and as the Mikra, meaning "that which is read".

Judaism has traditionally held that, along with the Torah, referred to as the Written Torah, God revealed a series of instructions on how to interpret and apply the Torah. The additional instructions were known as the Oral Torah. By the second century CE Jewish sages began writing down interpretations of the Bible; Orthodox Jews consider these writings to embody the "oral law." These writings take several forms:

- Talmud – An authoritative commentary on the Torah
  - Mishnah – An analysis of the laws and meaning of the Bible, containing information from the oral law.
  - Gemara – Rabbinical analysis of and commentary on the Mishnah
- Tosefta – A set of teachings that in many ways are similar to the Mishnah. It may be an early commentary on the Mishnah, or it may be an independent attempt to codify the oral law.
- Braitot – A genre of rabbinic literature from the same time period as the Mishnah and Tosefta that no longer exists. The only quotes still extant from this literature are found as quotes within the Mishnah and Tosefta.
- Midrash – A genre of rabbinic literature that is an elaboration of, and commentary on, Biblical narrative.

== Christianity ==
For Christians, the Bible refers to the Old Testament and the New Testament. The Protestant Old Testament is largely identical to what Jews call the Bible; the Catholic and Eastern Orthodox Old Testament (held to by some Protestants as well) is based on the prevailing first century Greek translation of the Jewish Bible, the Septuagint.

The Bible as used by Christianity consists of two parts:

- The Old Testament, largely the same as the Tanakh or Hebrew Bible.
- The New Testament
  - The four canonical Gospels. (Matthew, Mark, Luke, John)
  - The Acts of the Apostles recounts the early history of the Christian movement.
  - The Epistles are letters to the various early Christian communities.
  - The Book of Revelation, also known as the Apocalypse, is a book of prophecy usually interpreted as regarding the Second Coming of Jesus.

Christians disagree on the contents of the Old Testament. The Catholic Church, the Orthodox Churches and some Protestants recognize an additional set of Jewish writings, known as the deuterocanonical books. They are not accepted as canonical by the Jews (although some ancient Jews appear to have accepted them) and by most of the Protestants, who consider them to be apocryphal.

There are also a number of other early Christian writings some individual Christians regard as scripture, but which are not generally regarded as such by the churches. These include the apocryphal gospels, such as the Gospel according to the Hebrews, the Gospel of Thomas and the Gospel of Mary Magdalene.

== Differences ==
Jews regard the Old Testament part of the Christian Bible as scriptural, but not the New Testament. Christians generally regard both the Old Testament and the New Testament as scriptural.

The same books are presented in a different order in the Jewish Tanakh and the Christian Old Testament. The Torah/Pentateuch comes first in both. The Tanakh places the prophets next, then the historical material. The Christian Old Testament inverts this order, since the prophets are seen as prefiguring the coming of Christ.

Up to the first century CE, the books of the Tanakh were separate scrolls and their order was unimportant. The question of order arose with the invention of the codex. The order of the books is bound up with early Jewish-Christian polemics.

== See also ==
- Biblical canon
- Books of the Bible
