= P31 =

P31 may refer to:

== Aircraft ==
- Boulton Paul P.31 Bittern, a British prototype fighter aircraft
- Curtiss XP-31 Swift, an American experimental fighter aircraft
- Percival P.31 Proctor, a British radio trainer and communications aircraft

== Vessels ==
- ARA Drummond (P-31), a corvette of the Argentine Navy
- HMS Uproar (P31), a submarine of the Royal Navy
- INS Kavaratti (P31), a corvette of the Indian Navy
- LÉ Eithne (P31), a ship of the Irish Naval Service
- Maltese patrol boat P31, of the Armed Forces of Malta

== Other uses ==
- Makhuwa language
- Papyrus 31, a biblical manuscript
- Phosphorus-31 (P-31 or ^{31}P), a stable isotope of phosphorus
- Pioneer P-31, a failed lunar probe
- P31, a state regional road in Latvia
- P3_{1}, three-dimensional space group number 144
