= Elizabeth Brooke =

Elizabeth Brooke may refer to:

- Elizabeth Brooke (1503–1560), alleged mistress of Henry VIII and estranged wife of the poet Thomas Wyatt
- Elizabeth Brooke (writer) (1601–1683), English religious writer
- Elizabeth Brooke (1562–1597), wife of Robert Cecil, 1st Earl of Salisbury
- Elisabeth Brooke, Marchioness of Northampton (1526–1565), sister-in-law of Queen Catherine Parr and close friend of Elizabeth I

== See also ==
- Elizabeth Brooke Schrader or Libbie Schrader (born 1979), American singer-songwriter
- Elizabeth Brooks (disambiguation)
