= Papyrus Oxyrhynchus L 3525 =

Greek papyrus fragment

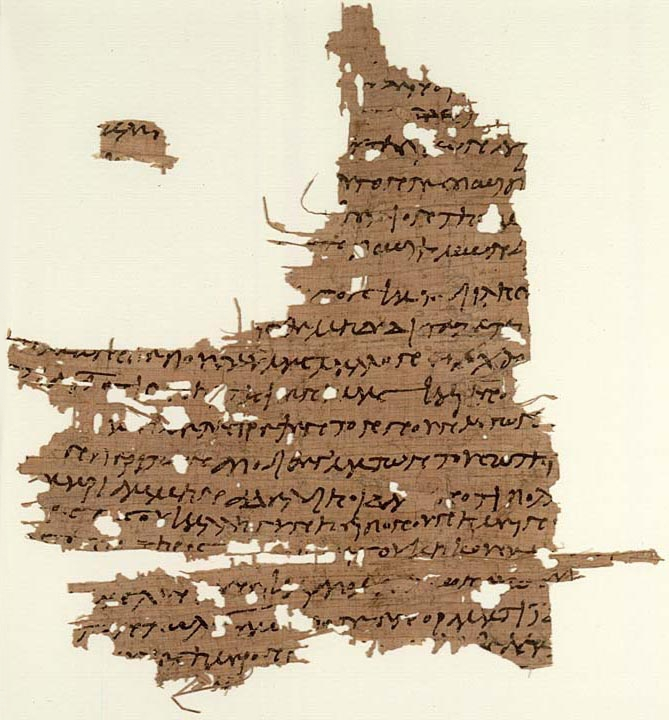
Papyrus Oxyrhynchus L 3525

Papyrus Oxyrhynchus L 3525 is a copy of the apocryphal Gospel of Mary in Greek. It is a papyrus manuscript formed in a roll. The manuscript had been assigned palaeographically to the 3rd century. It is one of the three manuscripts and one of the two Greek manuscripts of the Gospel of Mary. It is shorter than Papyrus Rylands 463.

== Description ==
It survives only as a small fragment of a single sheet (probably roll). The fragment is broken on all sides. The fragment covers the material contained in 9.1-10.10 of the Coptic manuscript. The reconstruction of the missing parts (especially the starts and ends of the lines) is not an easy task and depends on the Coptic text. There are some textual differences between the Greek fragment and the Coptic text.

It was written in ca. 50 letters per line. The nomina sacra are written in abbreviated form. The manuscript was discovered in Oxyrhynchus. The text was edited by P. J. Parsons. The manuscript currently is housed at the Papyrology Rooms of the Bodleian Art, Archaeology and Ancient World Library at Oxford with the shelf number P. Oxy. L 3525.

== See also ==
- Gospel of Mary
- Oxyrhynchus Papyri
- Papyrus Rylands 463
