= Societé Royale de Papyrologie =

The Societé Royale de Papyrologie, founded in 1930 in Cairo and placed under the protection of King Fouad 7 May 1930, is a library of Egyptian papyrus scrolls and fragments and papyrological studies. Under its former names, Société royale égyptienne de papyrologie (1932–36) and Société Fouad premier de papyrologie (1939–46) it has published its papyrological papers, Études de Papyrologie, which first appeared in 1932 under the editorship of Pierre Jouguet at Cairo's Institut Français d'Archéologie Orientale, with a break during World War II, that recommenced in 1950.

Papyri in the collection may bear the prefix Fouad, to commemorate Fouad I of Egypt: an example is Papyrus Fouad 266.

The majority of the collection of 303 papyri are now in the Collection Fouad in the Egyptian Museum in Cairo. Others are kept by the Institut Français d'Archéologie Orientale.
