= Papyrus Oxyrhynchus 5577 =

Papyrus fragment

Papyrus Oxyrhynchus 5577 (abbreviated as P.Oxy. 5577) is a papyrus fragment of early Christian origin. The text appears to be a dialogue between Jesus and Mary Magdalene. The P.Oxy. 5577 fragment is on a 13 × 9.4 cm leaf of papyrus.

It was first published in 2023 in Oxyrhynchus Papyri vol. 87, and edited by Juan Chapa. While Chapa speculates the text could be of Valentinian origin, he notes that the "fragment does not seem to be part of, or related to, any of the known Gnostic writings". Some scholars such as Elizabeth Schrader Polczer, Silke Petersen, and Sarah Parkhouse have speculated that the fragment could be a missing part of the Gospel of Mary. Other scholars, such as Mark Goodacre, have advised caution in the identification based on wordings which appear in the fragment but do not appear in the Gospel of Mary. Polczer also notes possible parallels with writings such as Irenaeus, Clement of Alexandria, Celsus, and the Wisdom of Solomon. According to Polczer, even if it is not part of the Gospel of Mary, "it shows that multiple ancient Christian groups identified someone named Mary as receiving special revelation from Jesus. This has real consequences for our understanding of Christian origins, as well as the authority given to women in some early Christian circles."

== Sources ==
- Parkhouse, Sarah (2 July 2024). ""Therefore I Say, Mary": P.Oxy. 5577 and the Gospel of Mary". Novum Testamentum. 66 (3): 382–401. doi:10.1163/15685365-12341738.
- Polczer, Elizabeth Schrader (June 2024). "Early Christianity, fragment by fragment". The Christian Century.
- Polczer, Elizabeth Schrader (Spring 2025). "'An Image of Eternal Incorruptible Light': P.Oxy. 5577 as a Possible Fragment of the Gospel of Mary". Journal of Early Christian Studies. 33 (1): 151–168. doi:10.1353/earl.2025.a954626.
