= Book of Deuteronomy =

Fifth book of the Torah in the Hebrew Bible

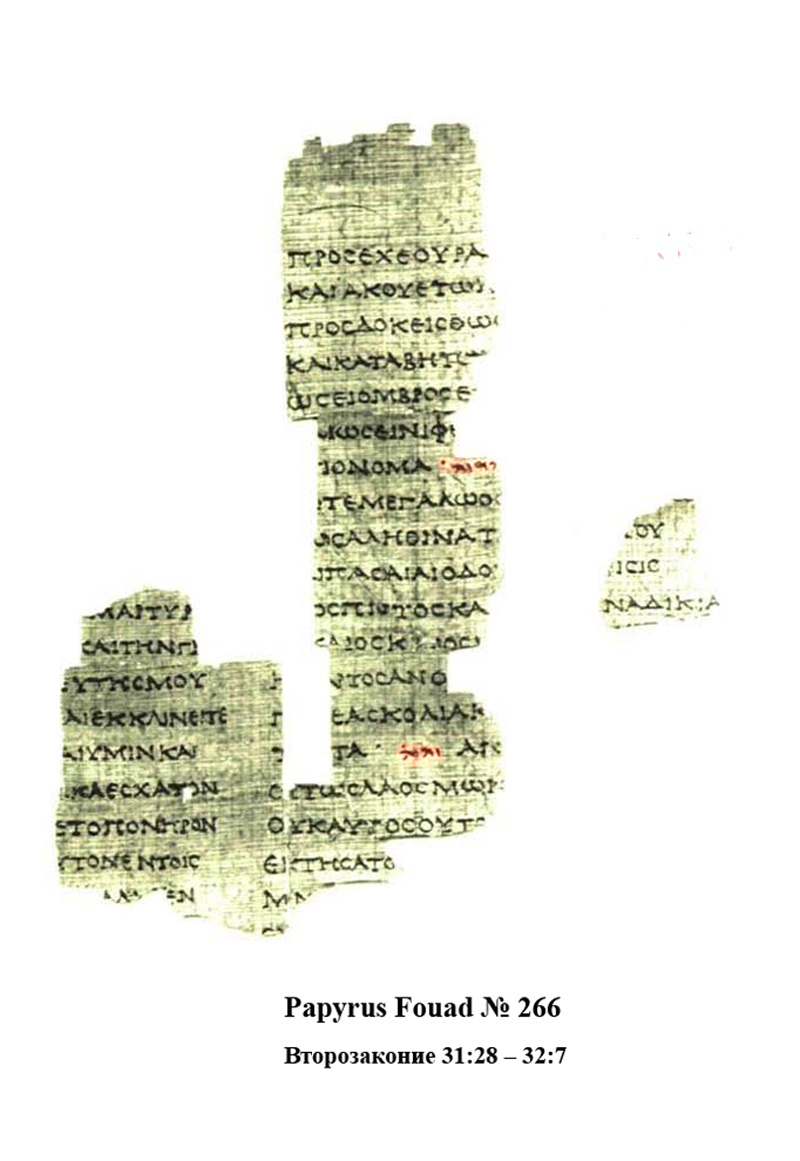
Papyrus Fouad 266, dating to c. 100 BCE, contains part of a Greek translation (Septuagint) of Deuteronomy.

Deuteronomy (Ancient Greek: Δευτερονόμιον, romanized: Deuteronómion, lit. 'second law'; Latin: Liber Deuteronomii) is the fifth and final book of the Torah (in Judaism), where it is called Devarim (Biblical Hebrew: דְּבָרִים, romanized: Dəḇārīm, lit. '[the] words [of Moses]'). It is the fifth book of the Hebrew Bible and Christian Old Testament.

Chapters 1–30 of the book consist of three sermons or speeches delivered to the Israelites by Moses on the Plains of Moab, shortly before they enter the Promised Land. The first sermon recounts the forty years of wilderness wanderings which had led to that moment and ends with an exhortation to observe the law. The second sermon reminds the Israelites of the need to follow Yahweh and the laws (or teachings) he has given them, on which their possession of the land depends. The third sermon offers the comfort that, even should the nation of Israel prove unfaithful and so lose the land, with repentance all can be restored. The final four chapters (31–34) contain the Song of Moses, the Blessing of Moses, and the narratives recounting the passing of the mantle of leadership from Moses to Joshua and, finally, the death of Moses on Mount Nebo.

One of its most significant verses is Deuteronomy 6:4, the Shema Yisrael, which has been described as the definitive statement of Jewish identity for theistic Jews: "Hear, O Israel: The Lᴏʀᴅ is our God, the Lᴏʀᴅ alone." This was also quoted by Jesus in Mark 12:28–34 as the Great Commandment.

Traditionally, it was believed that God dictated the Torah to Moses, but most modern scholars date Deuteronomy to the 7th–5th centuries BCE. By some it is considered to be the oldest book-sized segment of the Torah.

== Structure ==
Patrick D. Miller in his commentary on Deuteronomy suggests that different views of the structure of the book will lead to different views on what it is about. The structure is often described as a series of three speeches or sermons (chapters 1:1–4:43, 4:44–29:1, 29:2–30:20) followed by a number of short appendices or some kind of epilogue (31:1–34:12), consisting of the commission of Joshua, the song of Moses and the death of Moses.

Other scholars have compared the structure of Deuteronomy with Hittite treaties or other ancient Near Eastern treaty texts. But it is clear that Deuteronomy is not in itself simply the text of a treaty, as Deuteronomy is more than simply applying the secular model of treaty to Israel's relationship with God.

The Ten Commandments (Decalogue) in chapter 5 serve as a blueprint for the rest of the book, as chapters 12–26 are the exposition of and the expanded Decalogue.

Commandments	Chapters
1–3	12–13
4	14:28–16:17
5	16:18–18:22
6	19:1–21:9
7	22:13–30
8–10	23–26

== Summary ==
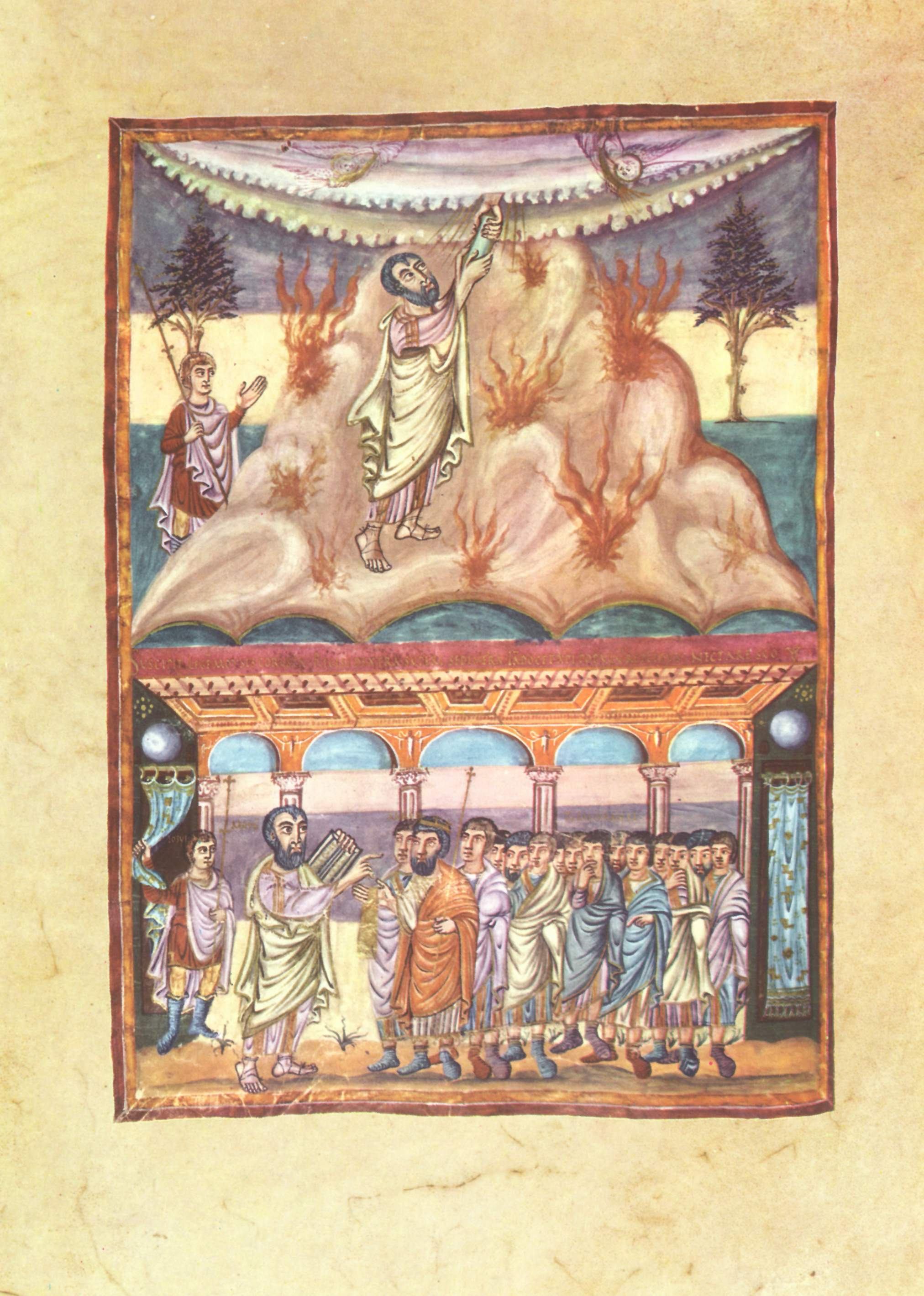
Moses receiving the Law (top) and reading the Law to the Israelites (bottom)

(The following "literary" outline of Deuteronomy is from John Van Seters; it can be contrasted with Alexander Rofé's "covenantal" analysis in his Deuteronomy: Issues and Interpretation.)

- Chapters 1–3: The journey through the wilderness from Horeb (Sinai) to Kadesh and then to Moab is recalled.
- Chapters 4–11: After a second introduction at 4:44–49 the events at Mount Horeb are recalled, with the giving of the Ten Commandments. Heads of families are urged to instruct those under their care in the law, warnings are made against serving gods other than Yahweh, the land promised to Israel is praised, and the people are urged to obedience.
- Chapters 12–26, the Deuteronomic Code: Laws governing Israel's worship (chapters 12–16a), the appointment and regulation of community and religious leaders (16b–18), social regulation (19–25), and confession of identity and loyalty (26).
- Chapters 27–28: Blessings and curses for those who keep and break the law.
- Chapters 29–30: Concluding discourse on the covenant in the land of Moab, including all the laws in the Deuteronomic Code (chapters 12–26) after those given at Horeb; Israel is again exhorted to obedience.
- Chapters 31–34: Joshua is installed as Moses's successor, Moses delivers the law to the Levites (a priestly caste) and ascends Mount Nebo or Pisgah, where he dies and is buried by God. The narrative of these events is interrupted by two poems, the Song of Moses and the Blessing of Moses.

The final verses, Deuteronomy 34:10–12, "Never since has there arisen a prophet in Israel like Moses," make a claim for the authoritative Deuteronomistic view of theology and its insistence that the worship of Yahweh as the sole deity of Israel was the only permissible religion, having been sealed by the greatest of prophets.

=== Deuteronomic Code ===
Deuteronomy 12–26, the Deuteronomic Code, is the oldest part of the book and the core around which the rest developed. It is a series of mitzvot (commands) to the Israelites regarding how they should conduct themselves in the Promised Land.

== Composition ==
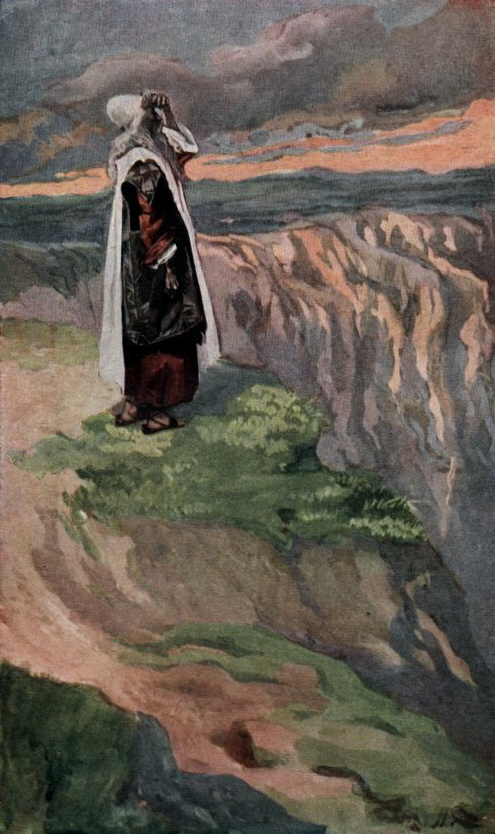
Moses viewing the Promised Land, Deuteronomy 34:1–5 (James Tissot)

=== Composition history ===
Mosaic authorship of the Torah, the belief that the five books of the Torah – including the Book of Deuteronomy – were dictated by God to Moses on Mount Sinai, is an ancient Jewish tradition that was codified by Maimonides (1135–1204 CE) as the 8th of the 13 Jewish principles of faith. Virtually all modern secular scholars, and most Christian and Jewish scholars, reject the Mosaic authorship of the Book of Deuteronomy and date the book much later, between the 7th and 5th centuries BCE. Its authors were probably the Levite caste, collectively referred to as the Deuteronomist, whose economic needs and social status the book reflects. The historical background to the book's composition is currently viewed in the following general terms:

- In the late 8th century BCE both Judah and Israel were vassals of Assyria. Israel rebelled and was destroyed circa 722 BCE. Refugees fleeing from Israel to Judah brought with them a number of traditions that were new to Judah. One of these was that the god Yahweh, already known and worshiped in Judah, was not merely the most important of the gods, but the only god who should be served. This outlook influenced the Judahite landowning ruling class, which became extremely powerful in court circles after placing the eight-year-old Josiah on the throne following the murder of his father, Amon of Judah.
- By the eighteenth year of Josiah's reign, Assyrian power was in rapid decline, and a pro-independence movement was gathering strength in the Kingdom of Judah. One manifestation of this movement was a state theology of loyalty to Yahweh as the sole god of the Kingdom of Judah. According to 2 Kings 22:1–23:30, at this time Hilkiah (the High Priest and father of the prophet Jeremiah) discovered the "book of the law" – which many scholars believe to be the Deuteronomic Code (the set of laws at chapters 12–26 which form the original core of the Book of Deuteronomy) – in the temple. Josiah subsequently launched a full-scale reform of worship based on this "book of the law", which takes the form of a covenant between Judah and Yahweh to replace the decades-old vassal treaty between King Esarhaddon of Assyria and King Manasseh of Judah.
- The next stage took place during the Babylonian captivity. The destruction of the Kingdom of Judah by Babylon in 586 BCE and the end of kingship was the occasion of much reflection and theological speculation among the Deuteronomistic elite, now in exile in the city of Babylon. The disaster was supposedly Yahweh's punishment of their failure to follow the law, and so they created a history of Israel (the books of Joshua through Kings) to illustrate this.
- At the end of the Exile, when the Persians agreed that the Jews could return and rebuild the Temple in Jerusalem, chapters 1–4 and 29–30 were added and Deuteronomy was made the introductory book to this history, so that a story about a people about to enter the Promised Land became a story about a people about to return to the land. The legal sections of chapters 19–25 were expanded to meet new situations that had arisen, and chapters 31–34 were added as a new conclusion.

Chapters 12–26, containing the Deuteronomic Code, are the earliest section. Since the idea was first put forward by W. M. L. de Wette in 1805, most scholars have accepted that this portion of the book was composed in Jerusalem in the 7th century BCE in the context of religious reforms advanced by King Hezekiah (reigned c. 716–687 BCE), although some have argued for other dates, such as during the reign of his successor Manasseh (687–643 BCE) or even much later, such as during the exilic or postexilic periods (597–332 BCE).

There is a suggestion in Moshe Weinfeld's translation and commentary on Deuteronomy, based on substantive affinities between the blessings and curses that appear in the book and the vassal treaties of Esarhaddon (pledging allegiance to the God of Israel and the Law in one version and to Esarhaddon in the documents exhumed from the archaeological record), that an important phase in the compilation of Deuteronomic law occurs at the same time as (and may be partly identical to) the Josianic reform. Weinfeld stringently rejects and dismantles the notion that the main body of the work might be post-exilic, without dismissing the obvious and unremarkable truth that textual changes accruing over generations of copying that extend for centuries are likely to have occurred and may be evident in the text. The dates that Esarhaddon reigned as an Assyrian 'King of the Universe' tend to prohibit any notion that the book was nearing a form that approaches its final draft during the reign of Hezekiah. However, the presence of Jeremiah on the scene, and of a general presence of northern refugees in the territory of Judah during Josiah's reign and thus throughout his reform, go some distance toward reconciling this reading with the notion that Deuteronomy is passed down to Judah as a Mosaic tradition of the north, insofar as Jeremiah has been interpreted as a liaison between the refugees of Israel and the native citizens of Judah sympathetic to both sides who enjoyed a reputation of authority in both communities.

Apart from the main body of the law of Moses in Deuteronomy, the second prologue (Ch. 5–11), and the first prologue (Ch. 1–4) appear as distinct units of the text; the chapters following 26 are similarly layered.

=== Israel–Judah division ===
The prophet Isaiah, active in Jerusalem about a century before Josiah, makes no mention of the Exodus, covenants with God, or disobedience to God's laws. In contrast, Isaiah's contemporary Hosea, active in the northern kingdom of Israel, makes frequent references to the Exodus, the wilderness wanderings, a covenant, the danger of foreign gods and the need to worship Yahweh alone. This discrepancy has led scholars to conclude that these traditions behind Deuteronomy have a northern origin. Whether the Deuteronomic Code was written in Josiah's time (late 7th century BCE) or earlier is subject to debate, but many of the individual laws are older than the collection itself. The two poems at chapters 32–33 – the Song of Moses and the Blessing of Moses were probably originally independent.

=== Position in the Hebrew Bible ===
Deuteronomy occupies a puzzling position in the Bible, linking the story of the Israelites' wanderings in the wilderness to the story of their history in Canaan without quite belonging totally to either. The wilderness story could end quite easily with Numbers, and the story of Joshua's conquests could exist without it, at least at the level of the plot. But in both cases, there would be a thematic (theological) element missing. Scholars have given various answers to the problem.

The Deuteronomistic history theory is currently the most popular. Deuteronomy was originally just the law code and covenant, written to cement the religious reforms of Josiah, and later expanded to stand as the introduction to the full history. But there is an older theory, which sees Deuteronomy as belonging to Numbers, and Joshua as a sort of supplement to it. This idea still has supporters, but the mainstream understanding is that Deuteronomy, after becoming the introduction to the history, was later detached from it and included with Genesis–Exodus–Leviticus–Numbers because it already had Moses as its central character. According to this hypothesis, the death of Moses was originally the ending of Numbers, and was simply moved from there to the end of Deuteronomy.

== Themes ==
=== Overview ===
Deuteronomy stresses the uniqueness of God, the need for drastic centralisation of worship, and a concern for the position of the poor and disadvantaged. Its many themes can be organised around the three poles of Israel, Yahweh, and the covenant which binds them together.

=== Israel ===
The themes of Deuteronomy in relation to Israel are election, faithfulness, obedience, and Yahweh's promise of blessings, all expressed through the covenant: "obedience is not primarily a duty imposed by one party on another, but an expression of covenantal relationship." Yahweh has elected Israel as his special property (Deuteronomy 7:6 and elsewhere), and Moses stresses to the Israelites the need for obedience to God and covenant, and the consequences of unfaithfulness and disobedience. Yet the first several chapters of Deuteronomy are a long retelling of Israel's past disobedience – but also God's gracious care, leading to a long call to Israel to choose life over death and blessing over curse (chapters 7–11).

=== Yahweh ===
Deuteronomy's concept of God changed over time. The earliest 7th century layer is monolatrous; not denying the reality of other gods but enforcing only the worship of Yahweh in Jerusalem. In the later, Exilic layers from the mid-6th century, especially chapter 4, this becomes monotheism, the idea that only one god exists. God is simultaneously present in the Temple and in heaven – an important and innovative concept called "name theology."

After the review of Israel's history in chapters 1 to 4, there is a restatement of the Ten Commandments in chapter 5. This arrangement of material highlights God's sovereign relationship with Israel prior to the giving of establishment of the Law.

=== Covenant ===
The core of Deuteronomy is the covenant that binds Yahweh and Israel by oaths of fidelity and obedience. God will give Israel blessings of the land, fertility, and prosperity so long as Israel is faithful to God's teaching; disobedience will lead to curses and punishment. But, according to the Deuteronomists, Israel's prime sin is lack of faith, apostasy: contrary to the first and fundamental commandment ("Thou shalt have no other gods before me") the people have entered into relations with other gods.

Dillard and Longman in their Introduction to the Old Testament stress the living nature of the covenant between Yahweh and Israel as a nation: The people of Israel are addressed by Moses as a unity, and their allegiance to the covenant is not one of obeisance, but comes out of a pre-existing relationship between God and Israel, established with Abraham and attested to by the Exodus event, so that the laws of Deuteronomy set the nation of Israel apart, signaling the unique status of the Jewish nation.

The land is God's gift to Israel, and many of the laws, festivals and instructions in Deuteronomy are given in the light of Israel's occupation of the land. Dillard and Longman note that "In 131 of the 167 times the verb "give" occurs in the book, the subject of the action is Yahweh." Deuteronomy makes the Torah the ultimate authority for Israel, one to which even the king is subject.

== Judaism's weekly Torah portions in the Book of Deuteronomy ==
- Devarim, on Deuteronomy 1–3: Chiefs, scouts, Edom, Ammonites, Sihon, Og, land for two and a half tribes
- Va'etchanan, on Deuteronomy 3–7: Cities of refuge, Ten Commandments, Shema, exhortation, conquest instructions
- Eikev, on Deuteronomy 7–11: Obedience, taking the land, golden calf, Aaron's death, Levites' duties
- Re'eh, on Deuteronomy 11–16: Centralized worship, diet, tithes, sabbatical year, pilgrim festivals
- Shofetim, on Deuteronomy 16–21: Basic societal structure for the Israelites
- Ki Teitzei, on Deuteronomy 21–25: Miscellaneous laws on civil and domestic life
- Ki Tavo, on Deuteronomy 26–29: First fruits, tithes, blessings and curses, exhortation
- Nitzavim, on Deuteronomy 29–30: covenant, violation, choose blessing and curse
- Vayelech, on Deuteronomy 31: Encouragement, reading and writing the law
- Haazinu, on Deuteronomy 32: Punishment, punishment restrained, parting words
- V'Zot HaBerachah, on Deuteronomy 33–34: Farewell blessing and death of Moses

== Influence on Judaism and Christianity ==
=== Judaism ===
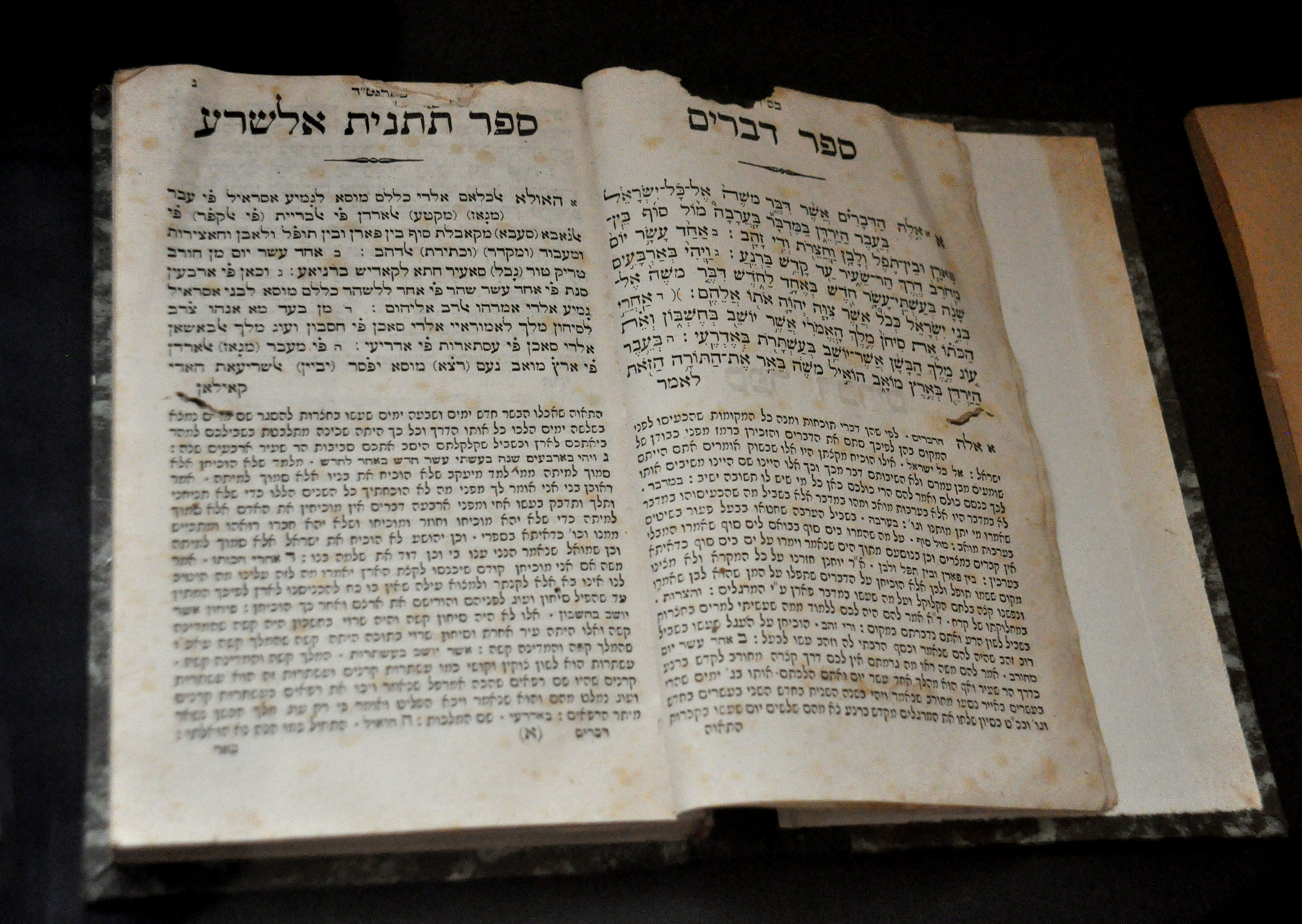
The Book of Deuteronomy, Debarim. Hebrew with translation into Judeo-Arabic, transcribed in Hebrew letters. From Livorno, 1894 CE. Moroccan Jewish Museum, Casablanca.

The Shema Yisrael is the fundamental creed of Judaism, and its twice-daily recitation is a mitzvah (religious commandment) for religious Jews. The recitation of the Shema continues with Deuteronomy 6:5–9:

And you shall love the eternal your God with all your heart and with all your soul and with all your might. Take to heart these instructions with which I charge you this day. Impress them upon your children. Recite them when you stay at home and when you are away, when you lie down and when you get up. Bind them as a sign on your hand and let them serve as a symbol on your forehead; inscribe them on the doorposts of your house and on your gates (RJPS).

"Love the eternal your God with all your heart and with all your soul and with all your might" became a principle central to Judaism: to return God's love in faith, relationship, and fulfillment of God's commandments.

=== Christianity ===
In the Gospel of Matthew, Jesus cited Deuteronomy 6:5 as the Great Commandment. The earliest Christian authors interpreted Deuteronomy's prophecy of the restoration of Israel as having been fulfilled (or superseded) by Jesus and the establishment of the Christian Church (Luke 1–2, Acts 2–5); Jesus was interpreted to be the "one (i.e., prophet) like me" predicted by Moses in Deuteronomy 18:15 (Acts 3:22–23). While the exact position of Paul the Apostle and Judaism is still debated, a common view is that in place of mitzvot given by God to the Jewish people in Deuteronomy and the rest of the Torah, Paul the Apostle, drawing on Deuteronomy 30:11–14, claimed that the keeping of the Mosaic covenant was superseded by faith in Jesus and the Gospel (the New Covenant).

== See also ==
- 613 commandments
- Documentary hypothesis
- Hebrew Bible
- Kashrut
- Mosaic authorship
- Papyrus Rylands 458 – the oldest Greek manuscript of Deuteronomy

== General and cited references ==
=== Translations ===
- Deuteronomy in NIV
- Deuteronomy in Tanakh (Hebrew Bible)

=== Commentaries ===
- Craigie, Peter C (1976). The Book of Deuteronomy. Eerdmans. ISBN 9780802825247.
- Miller, Patrick D (1990). Deuteronomy. Cambridge University Press. ISBN 9780664237370.
- Phillips, Anthony (1973). Deuteronomy. Westminster John Knox Press. ISBN 9780521097727.
- Plaut, W. Gunther (1981). The Torah: A Modern Commentary. ISBN 0-8074-0055-6
- Miller, Avigdor (2001). Fortunate Nation: Comments and notes on DVARIM.

=== General ===
- Ausloos, Hans (2015-10-22). The Deuteronomist's History: The Role of the Deuteronomist in Historical-Critical Research into Genesis-Numbers. BRILL. ISBN 9789004307049.
- Bandstra, Barry L (2004). Reading the Old Testament: An Introduction to the Hebrew Bible. Wadsworth. ISBN 9780495391050.
- Block, Daniel I (2005). "Deuteronomy". In Kevin J. Vanhoozer (ed.). Dictionary for Theological Interpretation of the Bible. Baker Academic.
- Braulik, G (1998). The Theology of Deuteronomy: Collected Essays of Georg Braulik. D&F Scott Publishing. ISBN 9780941037303.
- Brueggemann, Walter (2002). Reverberations of Faith: A Theological Handbook of Old Testament Themes. Westminster John Knox. ISBN 9780664222314.
- Bultmann, Christoph (2001). "Deuteronomy". In John Barton; John Muddiman (eds.). Oxford Bible Commentary. Oxford University Press. ISBN 9780198755005.
- Christensen, Duane L (1991). "Deuteronomy". In Watson E. Mills; Roger Aubrey Bullard (eds.). Mercer Dictionary of the Bible. Mercer University Press. ISBN 9780865543737.
- Clements, Ronald (1968). God's Chosen People: A Theological Interpretation of the Book of Deuteronomy. In series, Religious Book Club, 182. London: S.C.M. Press.
- Davies, Philip R. (2013). Rethinking Biblical Scholarship. Changing Perspectives. Vol. 4. New York: Routledge. ISBN 978-1-84465-727-8.
- Gottwald, Norman, review of Stephen L. Cook, The Social Roots of Biblical Yahwism, Society of Biblical Literature, 2004
- Knight, Douglas A (1995). "Deuteronomy and the Deuteronomists". In James Luther Mays; David L. Petersen; Kent Harold Richards (eds.). Old Testament Interpretation. T&T Clark. ISBN 9780567292896.
- Gili Kugler, Kugler, Moses died and the people moved on - a hidden narrative in Deuteronomy
- Laffey, Alice L (2007). "Deuteronomistic Theology". In Orlando O. Espín; James B. Nickoloff (eds.). An Introductory Dictionary of Theology and Religious Studies. Liturgical Press. ISBN 9780814658567.
- Levenson, Jon Douglas (1993). The Hebrew Bible, the Old Testament, and Historical Criticism: Jews and Christians in Biblical Studies. Westminster John Knox Press. ISBN 978-0-664-25407-0.
- Markl, Dominik (2013). "Moses' Praise and Blame – Israel's Honour and Shame: Rhetorical Devices in the Ethical Foundations of Deuteronomy". Verbum et Ecclesia. 34 (2). 34. doi:10.4102/ve.v34i2.861. hdl:2263/32114.
- McConville, J.G (2002). "Deuteronomy" (PDF). In T. Desmond Alexander; David W. Baker (eds.). Dictionary of the Old Testament: The Pentateuch. Eisenbrauns. Archived from the original (PDF) on 2008-04-13.
- McKenzie, John L. (1990). Raymond Edward Brown; Joseph A. Fitzmyer; Roland Edmund Murphy (eds.). The New Jerome Biblical Commentary (Reissue ed.). Englewood Cliffs, New Jersey: Prentice Hall. ISBN 978-0136149347.
- McKenzie, Steven L (1995). "Postscript". In Linda S. Schearing; Steven L McKenzie (eds.). Those Elusive Deuteronomists: The Phenomenon of Pan-Deuteronomism. T&T Clark. ISBN 9780567563361.
- Mendenhall, George E (September 1, 1954). Covenant Forms in Israelite Tradition. Biblical Archeology 3/17.
- Miller, James Maxwell; Hayes, John Haralson (1986). A History of Ancient Israel and Judah. Philadelphia: The Westminster Press. ISBN 978-0-664-21262-9.
- Pakkala, Juha (2009). "The date of the oldest edition of Deuteronomy". Zeitschrift für die Alttestamentliche Wissenschaft. 121 (3): 388–401. doi:10.1515/ZAW.2009.026. hdl:10138/328053. S2CID 170672330.
- Richter, Sandra L (2002). The Deuteronomistic History and the Name Theology. Walter de Gruyter. ISBN 9783110173765.
- Rofé, Alexander (2002). Deuteronomy: Issues and Interpretation. T&T Clark. ISBN 9780567087546.
- Rogerson, John W. (2003). "Deuteronomy". In James D. G. Dunn; John William Rogerson (eds.). Eerdmans Commentary on the Bible. Eerdmans. ISBN 9780802837110.
- Romer, Thomas (2000). "Deuteronomy In Search of Origins". In Gary N. Knoppers; J. Gordon McConville (eds.). Reconsidering Israel and Judah: Recent Studies on the Deuteronomistic History. Eisenbrauns. ISBN 9781575060378.
- Romer, Thomas (1994). "The Book of Deuteronomy". In Steven L. McKenzie; Matt Patrick Graham (eds.). The history of Israel's Traditions: The Heritage of Martin Noth. Sheffield Academic Press. ISBN 9780567230355.
- Sommer, Benjamin D. (June 30, 2015). Revelation and Authority: Sinai in Jewish Scripture and Tradition. Anchor Yale Bible Reference Library.
- Stackert, Jeffrey (2022). Deuteronomy and the Pentateuch. Anchor Yale Reference Library. Yale University Press. ISBN 978-0-300-16751-1.
- Tigay, Jeffrey (1996). "The Significance of the End of Deuteronomy". In Michael V. Fox; et al. (eds.). Texts, Temples, and Traditions: A Tribute to Menahem Haran. Eisenbrauns. ISBN 9781575060033.
- Van Seters, John (1998). "The Pentateuch". In Steven L. McKenzie; Matt Patrick Graham (eds.). The Hebrew Bible Today: An Introduction to Critical Issues. Westminster John Knox Press. ISBN 9780664256524.
- Van Seters, John (2015). The Pentateuch: A Social-Science Commentary. Bloomsbury T&T Clark. ISBN 978-0-567-65880-7.
- Vogt, Peter T (2006). Deuteronomic Theology and the Significance of Torah: A Reappraisal. Eisenbrauns. ISBN 9781575061078.

Book of Deuteronomy Pentateuch
Preceded by Numbers	Hebrew Bible	Succeeded by Joshua
Preceded by Numbers	Christian; Old Testament	Succeeded by Joshua
