= Berlin Codex =

Ancient Coptic manuscript

- Berlin Papyrus Collection
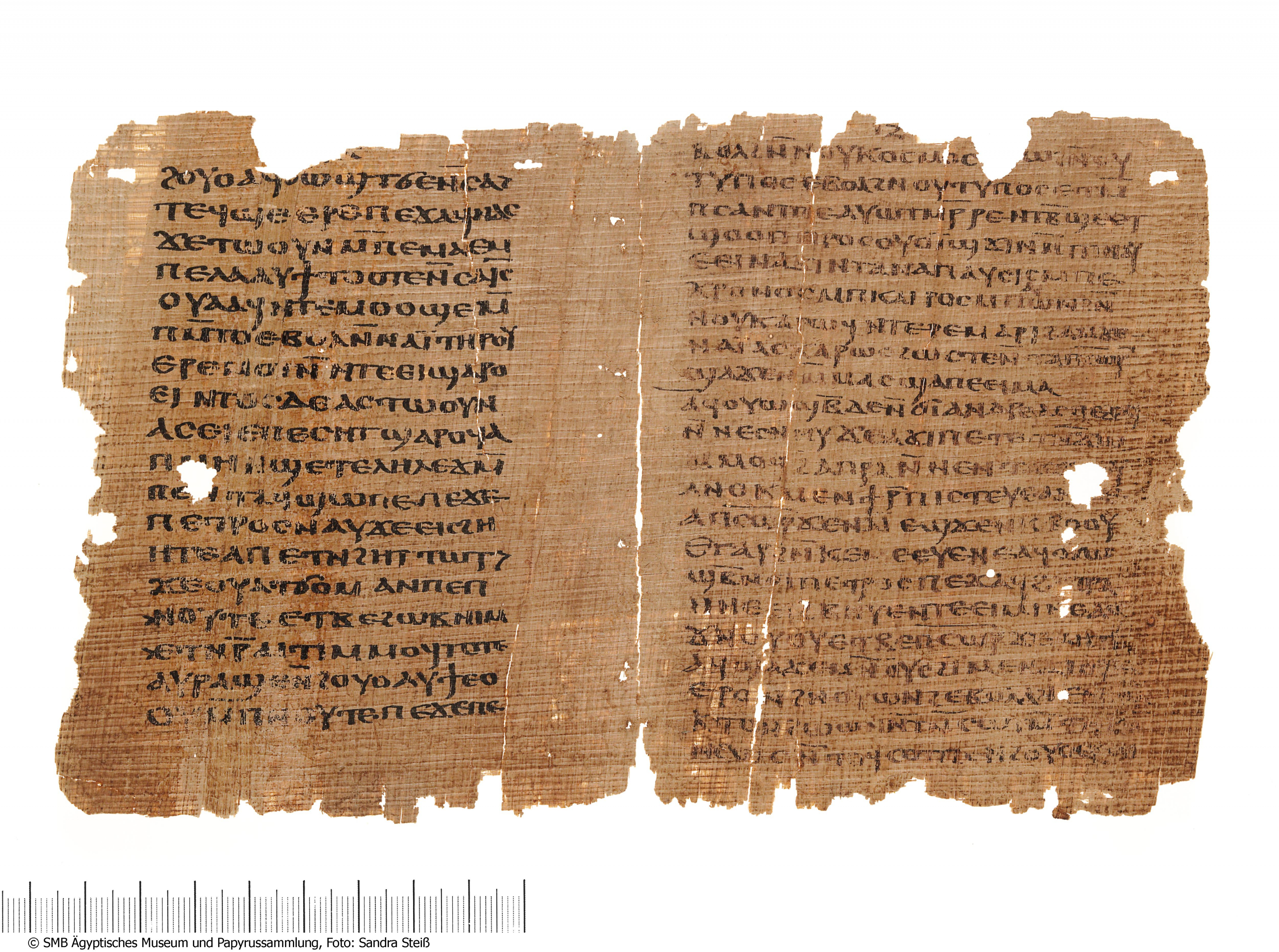
- Pages 130 and 17 of the codex
- Date: c. 5th century CE
- Place of origin: Akhmim, Egypt
- Language: Sahidic dialect of Coptic
- Material: Papyrus
- Contents: Gospel of Mary, Apocryphon of John, The Sophia of Jesus Christ, and an epitome of the Act of Peter
- Accession: 8502

The Berlin Codex (also known as the Akhmim Codex and the Berlin Gnostic Codex, BG), given the accession number Papyrus Berolinensis 8502, is a Coptic manuscript from the 5th century CE, unearthed in Akhmim, Egypt. In Cairo, in January 1896, Carl Reinhardt bought the codex, which had been recently discovered, wrapped in feathers, in a niche in a wall at a Christian burial site. It was a papyrus bound book (a codex), dating to early 5th century (or possibly late 4th century) that was written in Sahidic dialect of Coptic, which was in common use in Egypt during that time.

It was taken to Berlin for the Berliner Museen, where it was brought to the notice of the Royal Prussian Academy of Sciences by Carl Schmidt, 16 July 1896. Schmidt edited the Act of Peter in 1903, but the gnostic contents of the Berlin Codex were not finally completely translated until 1955. Few people paid attention to it until the 1970s, when a new generation of scholars of early Christianity took an increased interest in the wake of the discovery of the more famous group of early Gnostic Christian documents found at Nag Hammadi in 1945, known as the Nag Hammadi library.

The "Berlin Codex" is a single-quire Coptic codex bound with wooden boards covered with a leather that neither resembles tanned leather, nor does it resemble parchment or alum-tawed skin (i.e. skin that has been dressed with alum to soften and bleach it).

Four texts are bound together in the Berlin Codex. All are Greek works in Coptic translations. The first, in two sections, is a fragmentary Gospel of Mary, for which this is the primary source manuscript. The manuscript is a Coptic translation of an earlier Greek original. Though the surviving pages are well-preserved, the text is not complete and it is clear from what was found that the Gospel of Mary contained nineteen pages, assuming that the codex begins with it; pages 1–6 and 11-14 are missing entirely.

The Codex also contains the Apocryphon of John, The Sophia of Jesus Christ, and an epitome of the Act of Peter. These texts are often discussed together with the earlier Nag Hammadi texts.

== Works ==
- Die alten Petrusakten. im Zusammenhang der apokryphen Apostellitteratur nebst einem neuentdeckten Fragment, untersucht von Carl Schmidt, Hinrichs, Leipzig 1903. In: Texte und Untersuchungen zur Geschichte der altchristlichen Literatur. herausgegeben von Oskar von Gebhardt und Adolf Harnack, Neue Folge Neunter Band, der ganzen Reihe XXIV Band. This German translation refers to the papyrus manuscript P 8502 in the Berliner Papyrussammlung.
- Tuckett, Christopher (2007). The Gospel of Mary. Oxford Early Christian Gospel Texts. Oxford: Oxford University Press. ISBN 978-0-19-921213-2.
