= Elizabeth Schrader Polczer =

American bliblical scholar and singer-songwriter

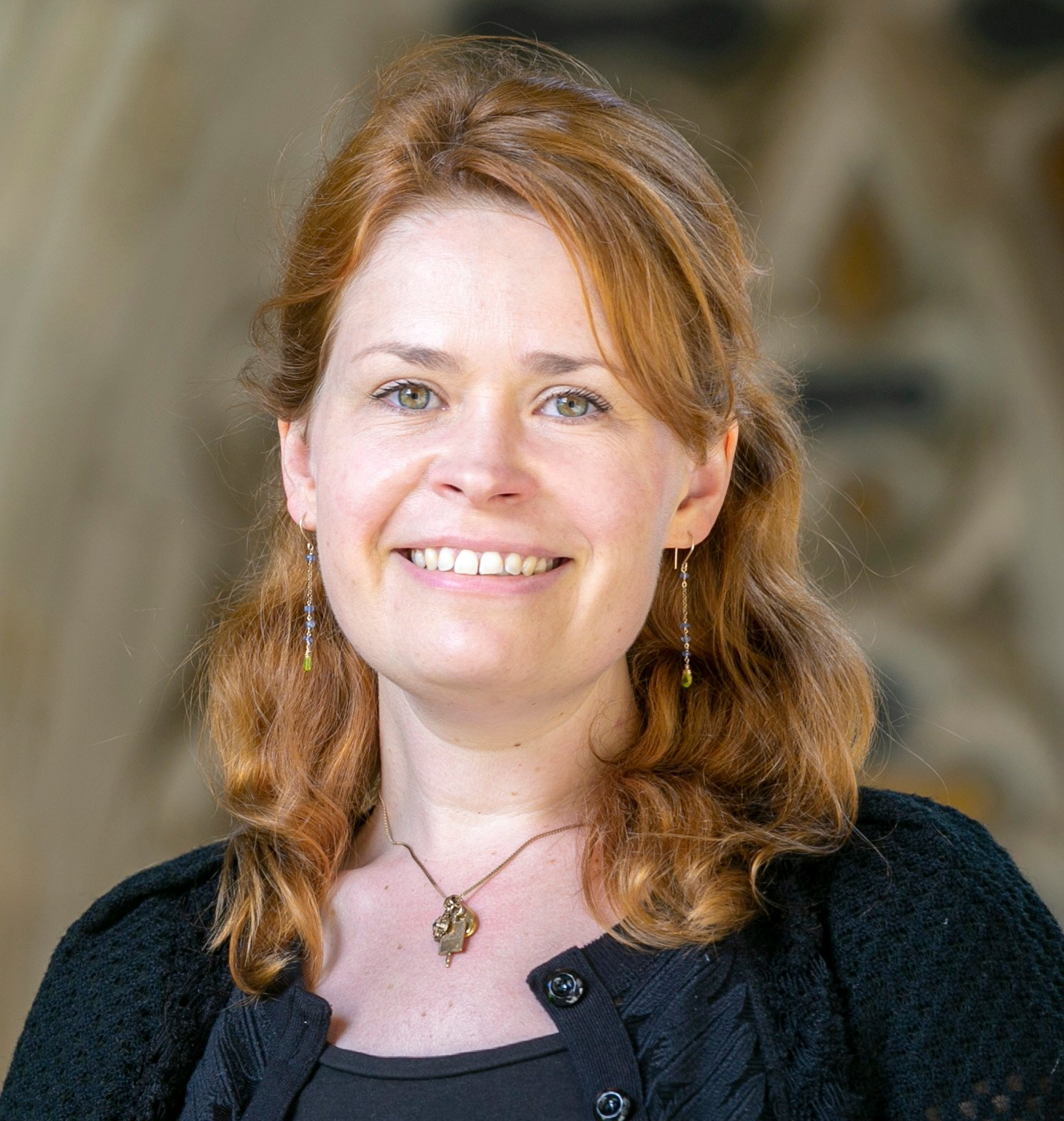
- Born: Elizabeth Brooke Schrader; September 14, 1979 (age 47); Eugene, Oregon
- Other name: Libbie Schrader
- Occupations: Biblical Scholar, Singer/Songwriter
- Spouse: Hínár György Schrader Polczer
- Awards: Pantene Pro-Voice competition, 2001

Academic background
- Education: Pomona College (B.A.); Boston University (School of Theology, concentration on New Testament); General Theological Seminary (Master of Arts); Duke University (PhD)

Academic work
- Discipline: Gospel Studies
- Sub-discipline: Mary Magdalene
- Website: https://www.elizabethschrader.com/

Elizabeth Schrader Polczer, better known as Elizabeth Schrader, is an American biblical scholar who concentrates on textual studies concerning Mary Magdalene, the Gospel of John, and the Nag Hammadi corpus. She currently teaches at Villanova University. Before transitioning to her academic focus, she was a singer/songwriter professionally known as Libbie Schrader.

Schrader grew up in Portland, Oregon and moved to California to attend Pomona College, from which she graduated in 2001. She moved to New York in 2008.

Schrader's involvement with religious scholarship began after a long and successful career as a singer-songwriter. In 2010 she launched a fan-funded campaign to record her album Magdalene. The album's title track led to Schrader doing research into Mary Magdalene in the Gospel of John, and to two master's degrees in theology from General Theological Seminary. She completed her doctorate in Early Christianity and New Testament studies at Duke University in 2023, and became an Assistant Professor of New Testament at Villanova University.

== Scholarship ==
Schrader is a textual critic who studies discrepancies between the earliest manuscripts of the gospels. She is particularly concerned with the many textual variants around the name Maria in manuscripts of John’s Gospel, and argues that such textual instabilities might be connected to controversies around Mary Magdalene in early Christianity. In her peer-reviewed articles Was Martha of Bethany Added to the Fourth Gospel in the Second Century? and ’Rabbouni,’ which means Lord: Narrative Variants in John 20:16, she suggests that the earliest extant manuscripts of John’s Gospel may contain evidence of editorial attempts to minimize Mary Magdalene’s role in that gospel. In her peer-reviewed article The Meaning of ‘Magdalene’: A Review of Literary Evidence (co-written with Joan Taylor), Schrader and Taylor argue that the word “Magdalene” could be an honorific title, not necessarily referencing Mary’s hometown (which, Schrader argues, could be Bethany).

In 2025, Dr. Schrader proposed that that Papyrus Oxyrhynchus 5577 may be previously-unattested fragment of The Gospel of Mary, originally located somewhere in the large gap left in the existing manuscripts. Sarah Parkhouse contemporaneously came to similar conclusions.

In 2022, Schrader presented the Carpenter Program Women’s History Month Lecture at Vanderbilt University, and she has made academic presentations at the Duke Divinity School and other universities.

== Music ==
Schrader was the first winner of the Pantene Pro-Voice competition in 2001, after a performance opening for Jewel at SummerStage in New York's Central Park. That same year, Schrader's group, The Wash, won the inaugural Pantene Pro-Voice Competition. In 2002, Schrader's group, known then as Think of England was chosen to be a part of Jewel's Soul City Café program, and opened three shows on her This Way tour. She also opened for other artists as diverse as India.Arie, Michelle Branch, Ray LeMontagne, and Rusted Root.

After Schrader went solo, she was a featured artist on MySpace in early 2006 and appeared in the Gilmore Girls episode Partings later that year.

A 2017 article in The Oregonian noted that despite her recent involvement biblical scholarship, Schrader's songs still "...focus on secular themes of love and loss, desire and real-life events, both serious and light-hearted."

=== Albums ===
- Letters to Boys (2004, self-released)
- Taking the Fall (2005, self-released)
- Libbie Schrader (2007, self-released)
- Magdalene (2011, self-released)
- Red Thread (2017, self-released)
