= Elizabeth Brooks =

Elizabeth Brooks may refer to:

- Elisabeth Brooks (1951–1997), Canadian actress
- Elizabeth Carter Brooks (1867–1951), African American educator, social activist and architect

== See also ==
- Elizabeth Brooke (disambiguation)
