= Pierre Jouguet =

French Egyptologist and classical philologist (1869–1949)

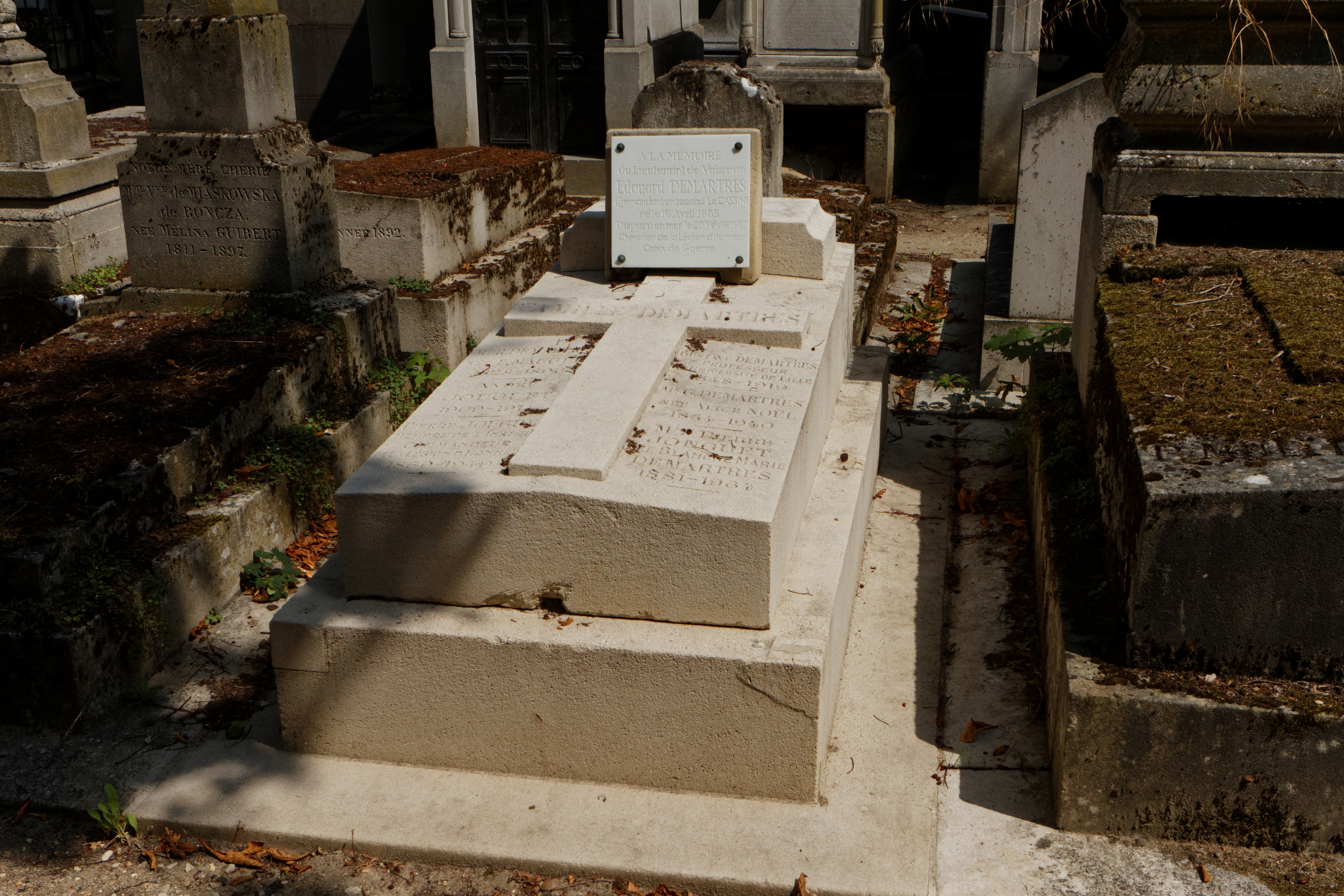
- Jouguet's grave at Pere Lachaise Cemetery
- Born: 14 May 1869; Bessèges
- Died: 9 July 1949 (aged 80); Paris
- Occupations: Egyptologist; Philologist

Pierre Jouguet (French: [pjɛʁ ʒuɡɛ]; 14 May 1869 – 9 July 1949) was a French Egyptologist and classical philologist. In 1890 he studied at the École Normale Supérieure in Paris, obtaining his agrégation for grammar in 1893. For three years thereafter he was associated with the École française d’Athènes, followed by work at the Institut Français d'Archéologie Orientale in Cairo (1896–97). From 1898 to 1910, he was a lecturer of grammar and philology at the Faculty of Arts in Lille. On 8 June 1911 he received his doctorate of letters at the Sorbonne, subsequently serving as a professor of ancient history and papyrology in Lille (1911–1914 and 1918–1920). From 1920 to 1933, he was a professor of papyrology at the Sorbonne, meanwhile serving as director of the Institut Français d'Archéologie Orientale (1928-1940). From 1937 to 1949, he was a professor at Fouad I University in Cairo.

During his earlier years spent in Egypt (1896–97, 1900), he translated numerous Greek papyri and worked at the excavation site at Ghorân. In 1901–02 at Fayoum, he discovered a small Hellenistic necropolis. In 1904, at Lille, he founded the Institut de Papyrologie. He was also founder of the Société royale égyptienne de Papyrologie and co-founder of the Société française d’Égyptologie and the Institut international de Recherches hellénistiques.

== Selected works ==
- Ostraka du Fayoum, in Bulletin de l'institut français d'archéologie orientale, 1902.
- La Vie municipale dans l’Égypte romaine, with P. Collart, J. Lesquier et M. Xonal, 1911.
- Les Papyrus grecs de Lille, 2 vols., 1907–1912.
- Dédicace Grecque de Médamoud, 1930.
- L’Égypte gréco-romaine de la conquête d'Alexandre à Dioclétien, 1932.
- L’Égypte ptolémaïque, in Gabriel Hanotaux, Histoire de la nation égyptienne, 1933.
- L’Égypte dans les premières civilisations méditerranéennes, with G. Fougères, 1935.
- L’Égypte alexandrine, 1940.
- L'Athènes de Périclès et les destinées de la Grèce, 1941.
- À la Grèce. Aux grecs, 1944.
- L'impérialisme macédonien et l'hellénisation de l'Orient, 1926. (translated into English and published as Macedonian imperialism and the Hellenization of the East, 1928).

== Bibliography ==
- J. Zeiller, Éloge funèbre de M. Pierre Jouguet, in Comptes rendus de l'Académie des inscriptions et belles-lettres, 1950
- A. Merlin, Notice sur la vie et les travaux de M. Pierre Jouguet, CRAI, 1950
- G. Lefebvre, Pierre Jouguet, Revue d'égyptologie n° 7, 1950
- O. Guéraud, Bibliographie des travaux scientifiques de Pierre Jouguet, Bulletin de l'institut français d'archéologie orientale n°54, 1954
- Ève Gran-Aymerich, Les chercheurs de passé, Éditions du CNRS, 2007, (p. 898–899)
