= Papyrus 31 =

Papyrus 𝔓^{31}
- New Testament manuscript
- Text: Romans 12 †
- Date: 7th century
- Script: Greek
- Found: Egypt
- Now at: John Rylands Library
- Cite: A. S. Hunt, Catalogue of the Greek Papyri in the John Rylands Library I, Literatury Texts (Manchester 1911), p. 9
- Type: Alexandrian
- Category: II

Papyrus 31 (in the Gregory-Aland numbering), designated by 𝔓^{31}, is an early copy of the New Testament in Greek. It is a papyrus manuscript of the Epistle to the Romans, it contains only Romans 12:3-8. The manuscript paleographically has been assigned to the 7th century. The reverse side is blank. It is possible that it was used as a talisman. Hunt suggested it was a lectionary.

== Description ==
Written in medium-sized sloping uncial letters. It seems to have been copied for reading in church.

The Greek text of this codex is a representative of the Alexandrian text-type. Aland placed it in Category II. An agreement with Codex Sinaiticus against the other chief MSS is observable in l. 9 of the fragment (v. 8).

Papyrus 31 presents unique readings in l. 3 (v. 4) and l. 4 (v. 5) against the other chief MSS.

It is currently housed with the Rylands Papyri at the John Rylands University Library (Gr. P. 4) in Manchester.

== See also ==
- List of New Testament papyri
