= Papyrus Fouad 266 =

1st century BCE manuscript of the Septuagint

Rahlfs 847, 848 and 942
- Société Royale de Papyrologie, Cairo
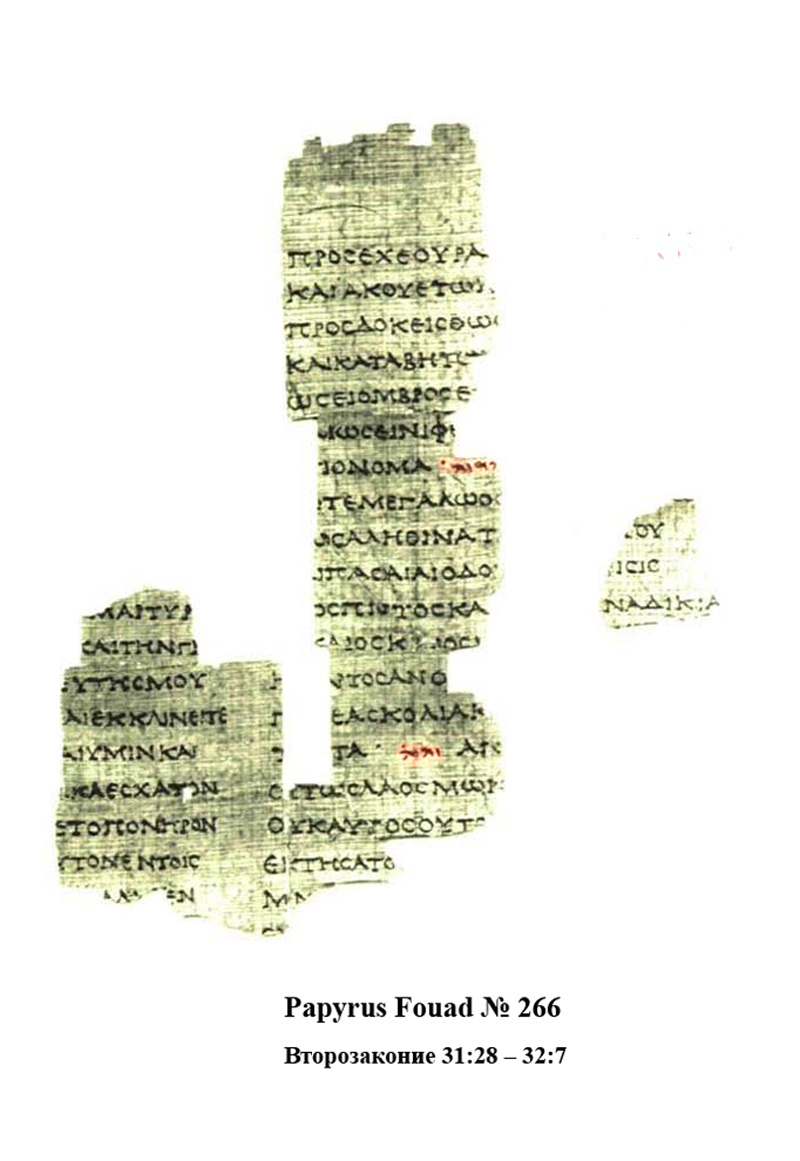
- Papyrus Fouad 266 fragment of the Greek text of Deuteronomy 31:28 - 32:7 with the Hebrew tetragrammaton יהוה inserted in smaller letters in the lower part of the middle column
- Type: Manuscript
- Date: 1st-century BCE
- Language: Koine Greek
- Material: Papyrus
- Condition: Fragmented
- Contents: Book of Genesis and Deuteronomy
- Discovered: Fayum

The Papyrus Fouad 266 (three fragments listed as Rahlfs 847, 848 and 942) are fragments, part of a papyrus manuscript in scroll form containing the Greek translation, known as the Septuagint, of the Pentateuch. They have been assigned palaeographically to the 1st century BCE. There is discussion about whether the text is original or a later recension of the Septuagint.

== Description ==
The Greek text was written on papyrus in uncial letters. The text is written in 33 lines per column. The uncial letters are upright and rounded. Iota adscript occurs. It is designated by number 847, 848, and 942, on the list of Septuagint manuscripts according to the modern numbering of Alfred Rahlfs. It contains section divisions with numbered paragraphs (5, 26, 27). 117 papyrus fragments of the codex have survived. This is "clearly a Jewish manuscript".

The prefix Fouad commemorates Fouad I of Egypt.

=== Version ===
While some interpret the presence of the Tetragrammaton in Papyrus Fouad 266, the oldest Septuagint manuscript in which it appears, as an indication of what was in the original text, others see this manuscript as "an archaizing and hebraizing revision of the earlier translation κύριος". Because of the presence of the name YHWH in Hebrew, Paul Kahle thought this was the most perfect text of the LXX:

A distinguishing characteristic of the papyrus is the fact that the name of God is written as the Tetragrammaton in Hebrew square-shape [(יהוה)]. Upon my request made for an examination by father Vaccari in regards to the published fragments of the papyrus, he came to the conclusion that the papyrus must be written 400 years before the codex B, probably the most perfect text of the Septuagint that has reached us.

The text of the manuscript runs close to the Old Greek text of Septuagint, but according to Albert Pietersma it is an early recension towards the Masoretic Text (i.e., Deuteronomy 22:9). Disagreeing with Pietersma, George Dunbar Kilpatrick and Emanuel Tov "see no recension at work."

=== Tetragrammaton ===
This papyrus, found in Egypt, is dated to the first century BC and is the second oldest known manuscript of the Septuagint (Greek version of the Hebrew Bible). It is the oldest manuscript that, in the midst of the Greek text, uses the Hebrew Tetragrammaton in Aramaic "square" or Ashuri script, יהוה over 30 times.

Some have argued that originally the Greek text rendered the divine name YHWH not by κύριος but by the Tetragrammaton, others that the text in this manuscript is the result of a Hebraizing revision of the original Greek text, which had κύριος. Albert Pietersma was the first to claim that Fouad contains some pre-hexaplaric corrections towards a Hebrew text (which would have had the Tetragrammaton). Pietersma also states that there is room for the reading ΚΥΡΙΟΣ (The Lord) but the second scribe inserted the Tetragrammaton instead. The space left by the first scribe is in fact exactly that required for six letters (as in the word ΚΥΡΙΟΣ), which Michael Thomas interprets as indicating that the older manuscript that the scribe was copying did have ΚΥΡΙΟΣ. Koenen has argued in his notes to the new edition of P. Fouad 266 "that the scribe of 848 was unable to write the Hebrew tetragram and hence left space for a second scribe to insert it", probably because "requiring greater sanctity". Emanuel Tov notes: "the original Greek scribe left open large spaces for Tetragrammaton indicated by a raised dot on each side of the space". Würthwein also judges that "the tetragrammaton appears to have been an archaizing and hebraizing revision of the earlier translation κύριος".

== History of the scroll ==
Palaeographically the manuscript has been assigned to the 1st or even 2nd century BC. It is the second oldest manuscript of the Septuagint. It was discovered in 1939 in Fayyum, where there were two Jewish synagogues. The first published text from the manuscript was edited by William Gillan Waddell in 1944. 18 further fragments of the manuscript were published in 1950 in the New World Translation of the Christian Greek Scriptures. It was examined by Françoise Dunand and P. E. Kahle. In 1971 were published all 117 fragments of the manuscript. The manuscript currently is housed at the Société Royale de Papyrologie, Cairo.

== See also ==
- Papyrus Rylands 458 – the oldest manuscript of Septuagint
- Biblical manuscript

== Sources ==
- Aly, Zaki; Koenen, Ludwig; International Association of Papyrologists. International Photographic Archive; Société egyptienne de papyrologie (1980). "Three Rolls of the Early Septuagint. Genesis and Deuteronomy. A Photographic Edition Prepared in Collaboration with the International Photographic Archive of the Association Internationale de Papyrologues. With Preface, Introduction, and Notes by Ludwig Koenen". Papyrologische Texte und Abhandlungen. Vol. 27. Bonn: R. Habelt. ISBN 3-7749-1417-6. OCLC 24798015.
- Dunand, Françoise (1966). "Papyrus Grecs Bibliques (Papyrus F. Inv. 266). Volumina de la Genèse et du Deutéronome". L'Institut Français d'Archéologie Orientale. Recherches d'archéologie, de philologie, et d'histoire. 27. OCLC 16771829.
- Kahle, Paul (1959). Aland, Kurt; Cross, F. L.; Danielou, Jean; Riesenfeld, Harald; Van Unnik, W. C. (eds.). Studia Evangelica. Berlin: Akademie-Verl.
- Hurtado, Larry (2006). The Earliest Christian Artifacts. William B. Eerdmans Publishing Company. ISBN 0802828957.
- Lange, Armin; Weigold, Matthias; Zsengellér, József; Tov, Emanuel (2009). From Qumran to Aleppo: a discussion with Emanuel Tov about the textual history of Jewish scriptures in honor of his 65th birthday. Vandenhoeck & Ruprecht. pp. 59–60. ISBN 9783525530948.
- Marcos, Natalio Fernández (2001). The Septuagint in Context. Boston: Brill. ISBN 90-04-11574-9.
- Metzger, Bruce M. (1991). Manuscripts of the Greek Bible: An Introduction to Palaeography. Oxford: Oxford University Press. p. 60. ISBN 978-0-19-502924-6.
- Meyer, Anthony R. (2022). Naming God in Early Judaism: Aramaic, Hebrew, and Greek. Studies in Cultural Contexts of the Bible. Vol. 2. Brill I Schoeningh. ISBN 978-3-657-70350-0.
- Rahlfs, Alfred (2004). Septuaginta - Vetus testamentum Graecum. Bd. 1/1 - Die Überlieferung bis zum VIII. Jahrhundert. Vandenhoeck & Ruprecht, Göttingen. ISBN 3-525-53447-7.
- Würthwein, Ernst (1995). The text of the Old Testament: an introduction to the Biblia Hebraica. Translated by E. F. Rhodes. Wm. B. Eerdmans Publishing. p. 190. ISBN 9780802807885.
- Wurthwein, Ernst; Fischer, Alexander Achilles (2014). The Text of the Old Testament: An Introduction to the Biblia Hebraica. Wm. B. Eerdmans. ISBN 978-0-8028-6680-6.
