= Act of Peter =

Miracle text celebrating virginity in the 5th-century papyrus Berlin Codex

This article discusses a text which is quite distinct from the Acts of Peter.

The Act of Peter is a brief miracle text celebrating virginity that is found in the 5th-century papyrus Berlin Codex (Berolinensis Gnosticus 8502). It treats of the crippled virgin daughter of Peter, who was accused by the crowd that gathered before his door, among whom he had caused many blind to see, the deaf to hear, and the lame to walk: "But your virgin daughter, who has grown up to be beautiful and who has believed in the name of God, why have you not helped her? For behold, one side of her is completely paralyzed and she lies crippled there in the corner."

Peter bids the girl rise and walk, and she does, and the crowd rejoices. "Then Peter said to his daughter, 'Go to your place, sit down, and become an invalid again.'" The crowd weeps.

Peter then relates the vision he received when the girl was born, that she would wound many with her beauty. "When the girl became ten years old, many were tempted by her. And a man rich in property, Ptolemy, after he had seen the girl bathing with her mother, sent for her so that he might take her for his wife."

A section is missing, and when the text resumes, Ptolemy's servants are putting her down before the house, and depart. Finding her "with one whole side of her body, from her toes to her head, paralyzed and withered, we picked her up, praising the Lord who had saved his servant from defilement, [and] pollution."

The contrite Ptolemy receives a vision, saying "Ptolemy, God did not give his vessels for corruption and pollution. But it was necessary for you, since you believed in me, that you not defile my virgin, whom you should have recognized as your sister, since I have become one Spirit for you both." This is the one Gnostic detail of the text, which is in every other way a conventional miracle tale.

Ptolemy leaves a plot of land to the girl, "since because of her he believed in God and was saved", and Peter sells it and distributes the price to the poor.

Only nominally connected with the Peter of the New Testament, this brief Act expresses in a characteristically extreme form the cult of virginity in the male-dominated 5th-century Christian Church, a cultural thread that may also be detected in many early Acta of female martyrs.

== Sources ==
- James M. Robinson, editor, 1990. The Nag Hammadi Library, revised edition (San Francisco: HarperCollins)
