= Papyrus Rylands 463 =

3rd century Greek manuscript of the Gospel of Mary

Papyrus Rylands 463 is a copy of the apocryphal Gospel of Mary in Greek. It is a papyrus manuscript in roll form. The manuscript has been assigned palaeographically to the 3rd century. It is one of the three manuscripts and one of the two Greek manuscripts of the Gospel of Mary. It is longer than Papyrus Oxyrhynchus L 3525 (POxy 3525).

== Description ==
Only a small fragment of a single sheet has survived. There is writing on both sides of the sheet, indicating that it was originally from a codex. The fragment is broken on all sides and contains the material contained in 7.4-19.5 of the Coptic manuscript. The reconstruction of the missing parts (especially the starts and ends of the lines) is not an easy task and depends on the Coptic text. The Greek text can only be conjectured based on the Coptic version. The manuscript is fragmentary but shows two errors.

There are some differences between the Greek fragment and the Coptic text. The nomina sacra are written in abbreviated form. The text was edited by C. H. Roberts in 1938. The manuscript currently is housed at the John Rylands Library (Gr. P. 463) in Manchester, England.

== See also ==
- Gospel of Mary
- Papyrus Oxyrhynchus L 3525 – another Greek manuscript of the Gospel of Mary
