= Gospel of Mary =

Early Christian text

The Gospel of Mary is an early Christian text first discovered in 1896 in a fifth-century papyrus codex written in Sahidic Coptic. This Berlin Codex was purchased in Cairo by German diplomat Carl Reinhardt. Additional Greek fragments of the text were subsequently found amongst the Oxyrhynchus Papyri.

Although the work is popularly known as the Gospel of Mary, it is not classified as a gospel by most scholars, who restrict the term "gospel" to texts "primarily focused on recounting the teachings and/or activities of Jesus during his adult life". There is no full copy of the book that has been found, as all available texts are missing some manuscript pages.

== History ==
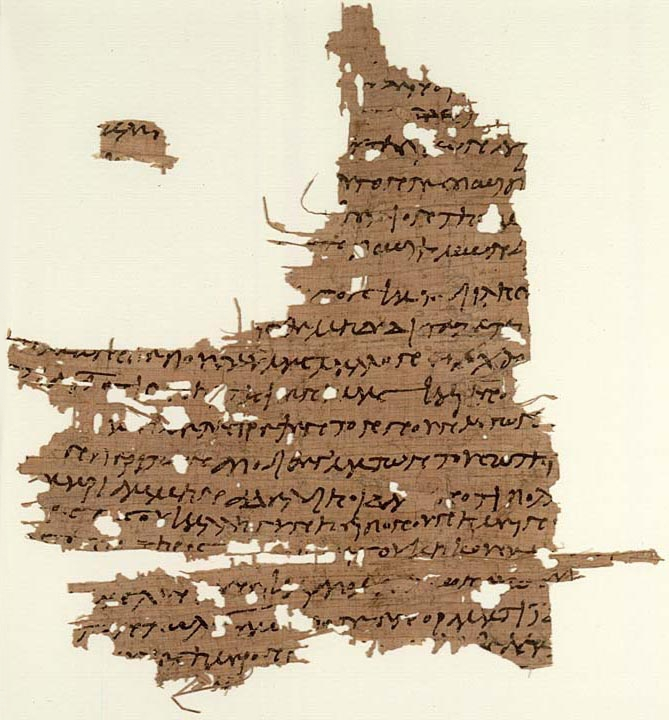
Gospel of Mary, P. Oxyrhynchus L 3525.

The Berlin Codex, also known as the Akhmim Codex, also contains the Apocryphon of John, the Sophia of Jesus Christ, and a summary of the Act of Peter. All four works contained in the manuscript are written in the Sahidic dialect of Coptic. At least two other fragments of the Gospel of Mary have been discovered since, both written in Greek. Papyrus Oxyrhynchus L 3525 was "found by Grenfell and Hunt some time between 1897 and 1906, but only published in 1983" by P. J. Parsons, while Papyrus Rylands 463) was published in 1938. The Coptic text of Mary was translated in 1955 by Walter Till.

Additionally, some scholars believe that Papyrus Oxyrhynchus 5577 may be an additional fragment of Mary originally located somewhere in the large gap left in the existing manuscripts.

Dating the gospel, as with most ancient literary texts, is problematic. As the earliest extant fragment of the gospel (the Rylands papyrus) dates to the early Third Century, it must predate this. Karen L. King, Hollis Professor of Divinity at Harvard Divinity School, suggested that the gospel was composed early in the Second Century, noting that it evidences familiarity with the Gospel of John, and perhaps the letters of Paul. Christopher Tuckett's discussion in his 2007 volume notes Pasquier's preference for a date in the second half of the century; Tuckett himself ultimately opts for a middle position – he places it in the first half of the Second Century but later than King.

The Gospel of Mary is not present in the list of apocryphal books of section five of the Decretum Gelasianum.

== The identity of "Mary" ==
Scholars do not always agree which of the New Testament people named Mary is the central character of the Gospel of Mary. Stephen J. Shoemaker and F. Stanley Jones have suggested that she may be Mary the mother of Jesus. Barbara J. Silvertsen alternatively suggests that she may be a sister of Jesus - an individual who has largely been lost in history. Silvertsen says that while none of the canonical Gospels identifies Jesus's sisters by name (Mark 6:3, Matthew 13:56), one of his sisters is identified as "Mary" in the Gospel of Philip.

Arguments in favor of Mary Magdalene are based on her status as a known follower of Jesus, and her appearance in other early Christian writings. She is mentioned as accompanying Jesus on his journeys (Luke 8:2) and is listed in the Gospel of Matthew as being present at his crucifixion (Matthew 27:56) and along with the "other Mary" being the first to see the Risen Lord (Matthew 28:9). In the Gospel of John, she is recorded as the sole first witness of Jesus' resurrection (John 20:14–16); (Mark 16:9 later manuscripts).

Esther A. de Boer compares her role in other non-canonical texts, noting that "in the Gospel of Mary it is Peter who is opposed to Mary's words, because she is a woman. Peter has the same role in the Gospel of Thomas and in Pistis Sophia. In Pistis Sophia the Mary concerned is identified as Mary Magdalene." The final scene in the Gospel of Mary may also provide evidence that Mary is indeed Mary Magdalene. Levi, in his defense of Mary and her teaching, tells Peter, "Surely the Saviour knows her very well. That is why he loved her more than us." In the Gospel of Philip, a similar statement is made about Mary Magdalene.

King also argues in favor of naming Mary Magdalene as the central figure in the Gospel of Mary. She summarizes: "It was precisely the traditions of Mary as a woman, as an exemplary disciple, a witness to the ministry of Jesus, a visionary of the glorified Jesus, and someone traditionally in contest with Peter, that made her the only figure who could play all the roles required to convey the messages and meanings of the Gospel of Mary."

Episcopal priest and scholar Richard Valantasis identifies the text's central figure as Mary Magdalene. He states it does not support popular claims of an earthly marriage to Jesus, but provides insight into the intellectual and spiritual environment of early 2nd century Gnosticism. Within the text itself, Mary's authority is depicted as contentious as Andrew questions the strangeness of her revelations, and Peter challenges her status, asking why Jesus would reveal secret teachings to a woman above the male apostles.

== Contents ==
The most complete text of the Gospel of Mary is contained in the Berlin Codex, but even so, it is missing six manuscript pages at the beginning of the document and four manuscript pages in the middle. As such, the narrative begins in the middle of a scene, leaving the setting and circumstances unclear. King believes, however, that references to the death of Jesus and the commissioning scene later in the narrative indicate the setting in the first section of the text is a post-resurrection appearance of Christ. As the narrative opens, Jesus is engaged in dialogue with his disciples, answering their questions on the nature of matter and the nature of sin. At the end of the discussion, Jesus departs, leaving the disciples distraught and anxious. According to the story, Mary speaks up with words of comfort and encouragement. Then Peter asks Mary to share with them any special teaching she received from the Jesus, "Peter said to Mary, 'Sister, we know that the Savior loved you more than the rest of the women. Tell us the words of the Savior which you remember – which you know (but) we do not, nor have we heard them.'" Mary responds to Peter's request by recounting a conversation she had with Christ about visions.

(Mary) said, "I saw the Lord in a vision and I said to him, 'Lord, I saw you today in a vision.'" He answered and said to me: "Blessed are you, that you did not waver at the sight of me. For where the mind is, there is the treasure." I said to him, "So now, Lord, does a person who sees a vision see it <through> the soul <or> through the spirit?"

In the conversation, Jesus teaches that the inner self is composed of soul, spirit/mind, and a third mind that is between the two which sees the vision. Then the text breaks off and the next four pages are missing. When the narrative resumes, Mary is no longer recalling her discussion with Christ. She is instead recounting the revelation given to her in her vision. The revelation describes an ascent of a soul, which as it passes on its way to its final rest, engages in dialogue with four powers that try to stop it.

Her vision does not meet with universal approval:

But Andrew answered and said to the brethren, "Say what you think concerning what she said. For I do not believe that the Savior said this. For certainly these teachings are of other ideas."

Peter also opposed her in regard to these matters and asked them about Jesus. "Did he then speak secretly with a woman, in preference to us, and not openly? Are we to turn back and all listen to her? Did he prefer her to us?"

It contains information about the role of women in the early church. The text was probably written over a century after the historical Mary Magdalene's death. The main surviving text comes from a Coptic translation preserved in a fifth-century manuscript (Berolinensis Gnosticus 8052,1) discovered in Cairo in 1896. As a result of numerous intervening conflicts, the manuscript was not published until 1955. Roughly half the text of the gospel in this manuscript has been lost; the first six pages and four from the middle are missing. In addition to this Coptic translation, two brief third-century fragments of the gospel in the original Greek (P. Rylands 463 and P. Oxyrhynchus 3525) have also been discovered, which were published in 1938 and 1983 respectively.

== Interpretation ==
The Gospel of Mary is often interpreted as a Gnostic text. According to Pheme Perkins, on the basis of thirteen works she has analyzed, the Gospel follows a format similar to other known Gnostic dialogues which contain a revelation discourse framed by narrative elements. The dialogues are generally concerned with the idea of Jesus Christ as reminder to human beings of their bond with God and true identity, as well as the realization of the believer that redemption consists of the return to God and liberty from matter after death. The Gospel of Mary contains two of these discourses (7:1–9:4 and 10:10–17:7) including addresses to New Testament figures (Peter, Mary, Andrew and Levi) and an explanation of sin as adultery (encouragement toward an ascetic lifestyle) which also suit a Gnostic interpretation. Scholars also say that the fifth-century Coptic version of the Gospel is part of the Berlin Codex along with the Apocryphon of John and The Sophia of Jesus Christ which are typically viewed as Gnostic texts; however, while many scholars take for granted the Gnostic character of the Gospel of Mary, the Gnostic beliefs concerning creation theory and the Demiurge that would suggest an extreme dualism in the creation are not present in the portions currently retrieved.

According to Bart Ehrman, "Mary (Magdalene) is accorded a high status among the apostles of Jesus." Peter actually acknowledges that Jesus loved her more than he loved all of the other apostles. Mary said she had a conversation with Jesus, and Andrew and Peter questioned this. "Four pages are lost from the manuscript", so there is really no way for anyone to know exactly what happened.

De Boer (2004) suggests that the Gospel of Mary should not be read as a Gnostic specific text, but that it is to be "interpreted in the light of a broader Christian context". She argues that the Gospel stems from a monistic view of creation rather than the dualistic one central to Gnostic theology and also that the Gospel's views of both Nature and an opposite nature are more similar to Jewish, Christian, and Stoic beliefs. She suggests that the soul is not to be freed from Powers of Matter, but rather from the powers of the opposite nature. She also says that the Gospel's main purpose is to encourage fearful disciples to go out and preach the gospel.

Karen King considers the work to provide

an intriguing glimpse into a kind of Christianity lost for almost fifteen hundred years...[it] presents a radical interpretation of Jesus' teachings as a path to inner spiritual knowledge; it rejects His suffering and death as the path to eternal life; it exposes the erroneous view that Mary of Magdala was a prostitute for what it is – a piece of theological fiction; it presents the most straightforward and convincing argument in any early Christian writing for the legitimacy of women's leadership; it offers a sharp critique of illegitimate power and a utopian vision of spiritual perfection; it challenges our rather romantic views about the harmony and unanimity of the first Christians; and it asks us to rethink the basis for church authority.

King concludes that "both the content and the text's structure lead the reader inward toward the identity, power and freedom of the true self, the soul set free from the Powers of Matter and the fear of death". "The Gospel of Mary is about inter-Christian controversies, the reliability of the disciples' witness, the validity of teachings given to the disciples through post-resurrection revelation and vision, and the leadership of women."

King also sees evidence for tensions within second-century Christianity, reflected in "the confrontation of Mary with Peter, [which is] a scenario also found in The Gospel of Thomas, Pistis Sophia, and the Coptic Gospel of the Egyptians. Peter and Andrew represent orthodox positions which deny the validity of esoteric revelation and reject the authority of women to teach."

Sarah Parkhouse argues that the Gospel of Mary is eschatological in nature. She states that it "draws on the conceptual world of the second century, reformulating the 'last things' in light of the Christian message". In this eschatology, the focus is on Christian life in the present rather than the future coming of Christ.

Tuckett argues that the women followers in the Gospel of Mary are positive role models for the reader. They are frequently contrasted with the men who fall short of expectations. The women are shown to be fallible, as are the men, but this is implicitly forgiven. Tuckett also states that Mary fulfils the role of the Savior in the Gospel of Mary in numerous ways.

== Portrayal in media ==
- Peeter Vähi's oratorio Mary Magdalene Gospel (2010–2011) is based on surviving fragments of the original Coptic text of the Gospel of Mary.
- Mark Adamo's 2013 opera The Gospel of Mary Magdalene is based largely on the Gospel of Mary and the Gospel of John. The libretto also includes quotes from the Gospel of Thomas, Pistis Sophia and the Gospel of Philip.
- A forgery of the Gospel of Mary Magdalene appears in the X-Files episode "Hollywood A.D."
- A quote from the Gospel of Mary is found in the 2006 movie The Da Vinci Code as confirmation that Jesus had a wife, and was mortal.

== See also ==
- List of Gospels
