= List of octodontids =

Species in mammal family Octodontidae

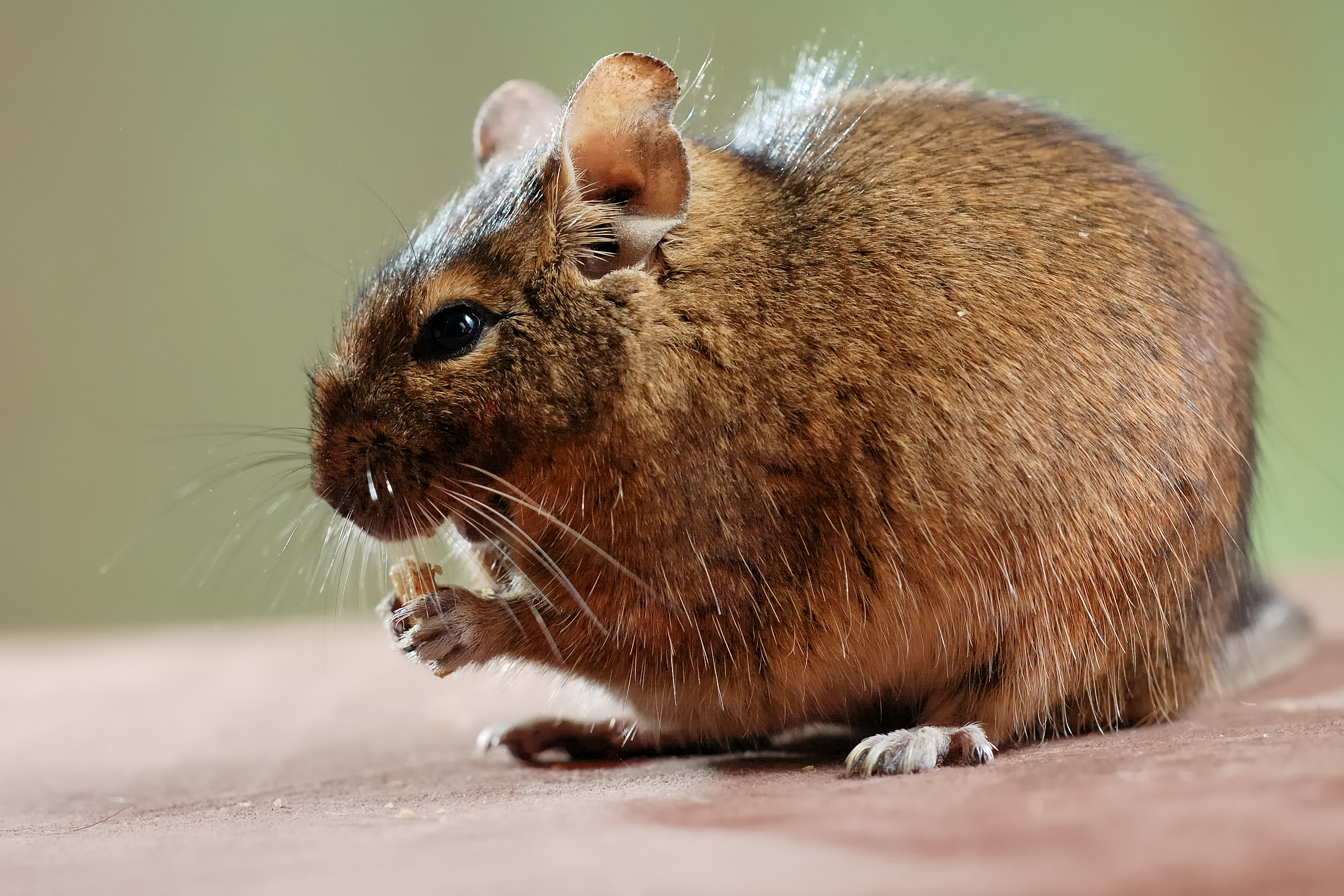
Common degu (Octodon degus)

Octodontidae is a family of mammals in the order Rodentia and part of the Caviomorpha parvorder. Members of this family are called octodontids and include degus, rock rats, and viscacha rats. They are found in southern South America, primarily in forests, shrublands, and rocky areas, though some species can be found in savannas, grasslands, and wetlands. They range in size from the coruro, at 11 cm (4 in) plus a 4 cm (2 in) tail, to the mountain viscacha rat, at 33 cm (13 in) plus a 18 cm (7 in) tail. Octodontids are herbivores, and eat a variety of plant matter and fruit, with some species also eating dung. No octodontids have population estimates, but three species—the Pacific degu, golden viscacha rat, and Chalchalero viscacha rat—are categorized as critically endangered.

The fourteen extant species of Octodontidae are divided into seven genera, which range in size from one to four species. Several extinct prehistoric octodontid species have been discovered, though due to ongoing research and discoveries, the exact number and categorization is not fixed.

== Conventions ==
IUCN Red List categories
Conservation status
- EX: Extinct (0 species)
- EW: Extinct in the wild (0 species)
- CR: Critically endangered (3 species)
- EN: Endangered (0 species)
- VU: Vulnerable (1 species)
- NT: Near threatened (2 species)
- LC: Least concern (5 species)

Other categories
- DD: Data deficient (3 species)
- NE: Not evaluated (0 species)

The author citation for the species or genus is given after the scientific name; parentheses around the author citation indicate that this was not the original taxonomic placement. Conservation status codes listed follow the International Union for Conservation of Nature (IUCN) Red List of Threatened Species. Range maps are provided wherever possible; if a range map is not available, a description of the octodontid's range is provided. Ranges are based on the IUCN Red List for that species unless otherwise noted.

== Classification ==
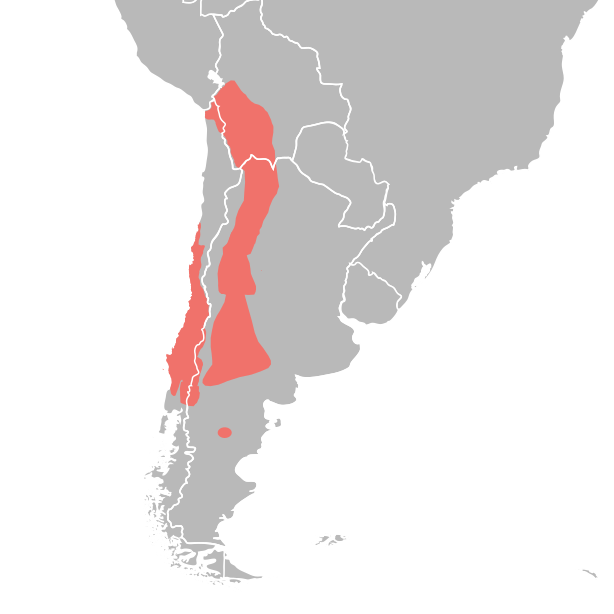
Octodontidae distribution

Octodontidae is a family consisting of fourteen extant species in seven genera. This does not include hybrid species or extinct prehistoric species.

Family Octodontidae

- Genus Aconaemys (rock rats): three species
- Genus Octodon (degus): four species
- Genus Octodontomys (mountain degu): one species
- Genus Octomys (mountain viscacha rat): one species
- Genus Pipanacoctomys (golden viscacha rat): one species
- Genus Spalacopus (coruro): one species
- Genus Tympanoctomys (viscacha rats): three species

- Octodontidae
  - - - - Aconaemys
        - Spalacopus
      - Octodon
    - Octodontomys
  - - Octomys
    - - Pipanacoctomys
      - Tympanoctomys

== Octodontids ==
The following classification is based on the taxonomy described by the reference work Mammal Species of the World (2005), with augmentation by generally accepted proposals made since using molecular phylogenetic analysis, as supported by both the IUCN and the American Society of Mammalogists.

Genus Aconaemys – Ameghino, 1891 – three species
| Common name | Scientific name and subspecies | Range | Size and ecology | IUCN status and estimated population |
|---|---|---|---|---|
| Chilean rock rat | A. fuscus (Waterhouse, 1842) | Eastern Chile (in red) | Size: 15–17 cm (6–7 in) long, plus 5–8 cm (2–3 in) tail Habitat: Forest Diet: Roots, fruit, and other vegetation | LC Unknown |
| Porter's rock rat | A. porteri Thomas, 1917 | Eastern Chile and western Argentina (in blue) | Size: 14–20 cm (6–8 in) long, plus 6–9 cm (2–4 in) tail Habitat: Forest and rocky areas Diet: Roots, fruit, and other vegetation | DD Unknown |
| Sage's rock rat | A. sagei Pearson, 1984 | Central Chile (in green) | Size: 14–16 cm (6 in) long, plus 5–7 cm (2–3 in) tail Habitat: Forest and rocky areas Diet: Roots, fruit, and other vegetation | DD Unknown |

Genus Octodon – Bennett, 1823 – four species
| Common name | Scientific name and subspecies | Range | Size and ecology | IUCN status and estimated population |
|---|---|---|---|---|
| Bridges's degu | O. bridgesii Waterhouse, 1845 | Central Chile and western Argentina (in blue) | Size: 15–20 cm (6–8 in) long, plus 10–17 cm (4–7 in) tail Habitat: Forest and shrubland Diet: Grass, leaves, bark, herbs, seeds, and fruit, as well as dung | VU Unknown |
| Common degu | O. degus (Molina, 1782) | Central Chile | Size: 16–21 cm (6–8 in) long, plus 8–14 cm (3–6 in) tail Habitat: Shrubland Diet: Grass, leaves, bark, herbs, seeds, and fruit, as well as dung | LC Unknown |
| Moon-toothed degu | O. lunatus Osgood, 1943 | Central Chile | Size: 16–22 cm (6–9 in) long, plus 15–17 cm (6–7 in) tail Habitat: Shrubland and rocky areas Diet: Grass, leaves, bark, herbs, seeds, and fruit, as well as dung | NT Unknown |
| Pacific degu | O. pacificus R. Hutterer, 1994 | Mocha Island in Chile | Size: 12–20 cm (5–8 in) long, plus 16–17 cm (6–7 in) tail Habitat: Forest Diet: Grass, leaves, bark, herbs, seeds, and fruit, as well as dung | CR Unknown |

Genus Octodontomys – Palmer, 1903 – one species
| Common name | Scientific name and subspecies | Range | Size and ecology | IUCN status and estimated population |
|---|---|---|---|---|
| Mountain degu | O. gliroides (Gervais & d'Orbigny, 1844) | Northern Chile, southwestern Bolivia, and northwestern Argentina | Size: 16–19 cm (6–7 in) long, plus 10–19 cm (4–7 in) tail Habitat: Shrubland, grassland, and rocky areas Diet: Acacia seed pods and cactus fruits | LC Unknown |

Genus Octomys – Thomas, 1920 – one species
| Common name | Scientific name and subspecies | Range | Size and ecology | IUCN status and estimated population |
|---|---|---|---|---|
| Mountain viscacha rat | O. mimax Thomas, 1920 | Western Argentina | Size: 14–33 cm (6–13 in) long, plus 10–18 cm (4–7 in) tail Habitat: Rocky areas Diet: Roots, bark, and cactus | LC Unknown |

Genus Pipanacoctomys – Mares, Braun, Barquez, & Díaz, 2000 – one species
| Common name | Scientific name and subspecies | Range | Size and ecology | IUCN status and estimated population |
|---|---|---|---|---|
| Golden viscacha rat | P. aureus Mares, Braun, Barquez, & Díaz, 2000 | Northwestern Argentina | Size: 16–18 cm (6–7 in) long, plus 12–15 cm (5–6 in) tail Habitat: Inland wetlands Diet: Leaves and stems | CR Unknown |

Genus Spalacopus – Wagler, 1832 – one species
| Common name | Scientific name and subspecies | Range | Size and ecology | IUCN status and estimated population |
|---|---|---|---|---|
| Coruro | S. cyanus (Molina, 1782) Three subspecies: S. c. cyanus; S. c. maulinus; S. c. poeppigii | Central Chile | Size: 11–17 cm (4–7 in) long, plus 4–6 cm (2 in) tail Habitat: Forest, savanna and grassland Diet: Tubers and stems of Leucocoryne and other plants | LC Unknown |

Genus Tympanoctomys – Yepes, 1942 – three species
| Common name | Scientific name and subspecies | Range | Size and ecology | IUCN status and estimated population |
|---|---|---|---|---|
| Chalchalero viscacha rat | T. loschalchalerosorum Mares, Braun, Barquez, & Díaz, 2000 | Northern Argentina (in blue, in box) | Size: 14–16 cm (6 in) long, plus 11–12 cm (4–5 in) tail Habitat: Wetlands and shrublands Diet: Leaves and stems | CR Unknown |
| Kirchner's viscacha rat | T. kirchnerorum Teta, Pardiñas, Sauthier, & Gallardo, 2014 | Southern Argentina (in green) | Size: 11–14 cm (4–6 in) long, plus 11–12 cm (4–5 in) tail Habitat: Shrubland, grassland Diet: Leaves and stems | DD Unknown |
| Plains viscacha rat | T. barrerae (B. Lawrence, 1941) | Western Argentina (in red) | Size: 12–16 cm (5–6 in) long, plus 9–15 cm (4–6 in) tail Habitat: Shrubland Diet: Leaves and stems | NT Unknown |

== Sources ==
- Chernasky, Amy; Motis, Anna; Burgin, Connor, eds. (2023). All the Mammals of the World. Lynx Nature Books. ISBN 978-84-16728-66-4.
- Gallardo, Milton H.; Ojeda, Ricardo A.; González, Claudio A.; Ríos, Carolina A. (2007). "Una Revision de Octodontidae" [The Octodontidae Revisited]. In Kelt, Douglas A.; Lessa, Enrique P.; Salazar-Bravo, Jorge; Patton, James L. (eds.). The Quintessential Naturalist: Honoring the Life and Legacy of Oliver P. Pearson. University of California Press. doi:10.1525/california/9780520098596.003.0019. ISBN 978-0-520-09859-6.
- Nowak, Ronald M. (1999). Walker's Mammals of the World. Vol. 2 (6th ed.). Johns Hopkins University Press. ISBN 978-0-8018-5789-8.
- Woods, Charles A.; Kilpatrick, C. William (2005). Wilson, Don E.; Reeder, DeeAnn M. (eds.). Mammal Species of the World. Vol. 2 (3rd ed.). Johns Hopkins University Press. ISBN 978-0-8018-8221-0.
