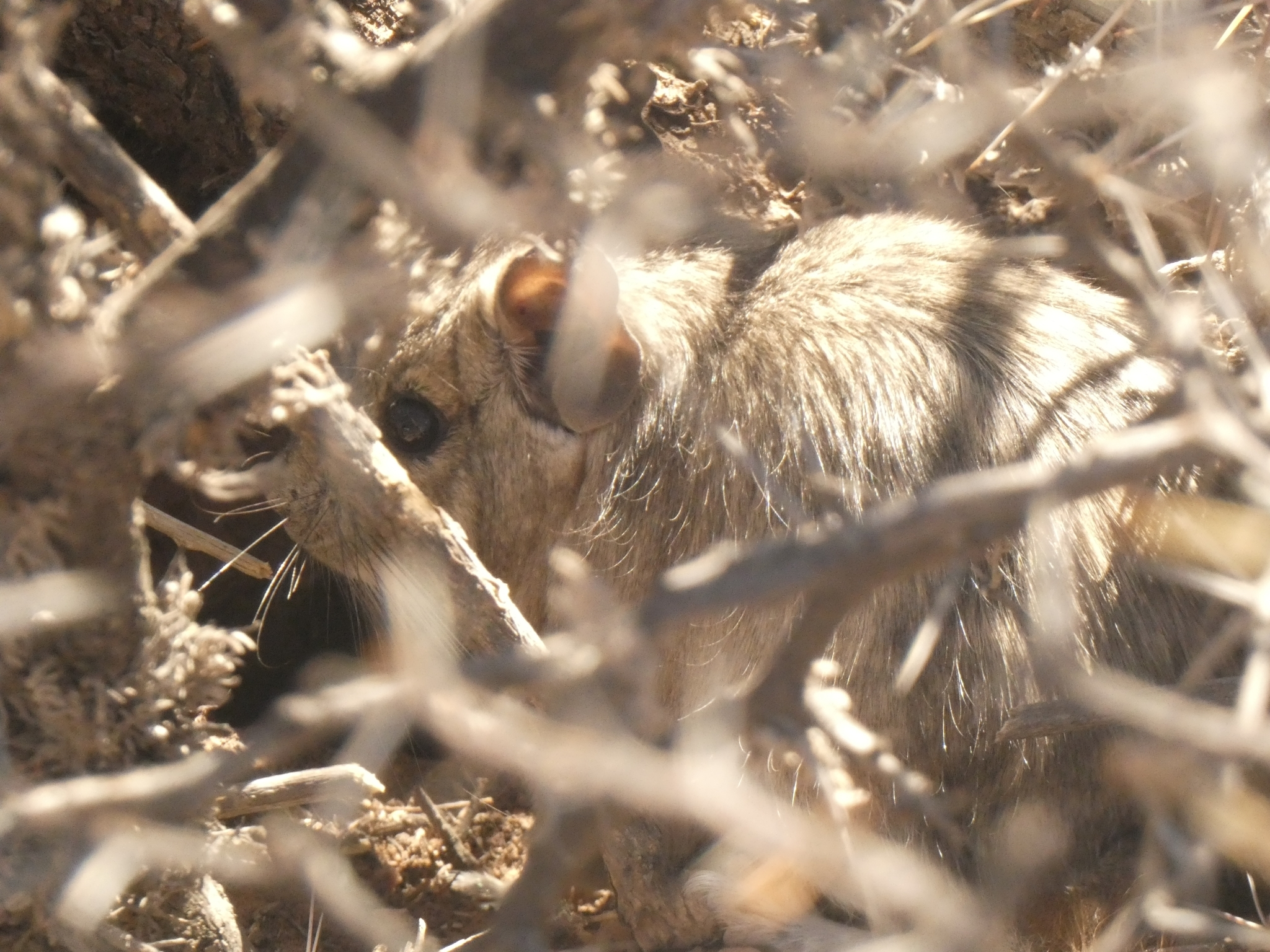
- Humahuaca Department, Argentina

Conservation status
- Least Concern (IUCN 3.1)

Scientific classification
- Kingdom: Animalia
- Phylum: Chordata
- Class: Mammalia
- Order: Rodentia
- Family: Octodontidae
- Genus: Octodontomys; Palmer, 1903
- Species: O. gliroides

Binomial name
- Octodontomys gliroides (Gervais & d'Orbigny, 1844)
- O. gliroides range

Synonyms
- Octodon gliroides Gervais & d'Orbigny, 1844; Neoctodon simonsi O. Thomas, 1902

= Mountain degu =

Species of rodent

The mountain degu (Octodontomys gliroides), also known as the Andean degu, is a species of rodent in the family Octodontidae. It is the only species in the genus Octodontomys. It is a medium-sized rodent with long, silky grey-brown fur, large grey ears, and white-furred chin and underparts. It is found in the foothills of the Andes in Argentina, Bolivia and Chile, and closely resembles the mountain viscacha rat and viscacha rats in the genus Tympanoctomys, all of which are found in Argentina. It is an herbivore, and eats grasses, leaves, bark, and cacti. The mountain degu gets most of its water from eating the tissues of prickly pear cactuses and cactuses in the genus Cereus.

The mountain degu is a social animal, though not as much as the related common degu, and lives in family units of two to four individuals that share a burrow, play together, and take dust baths in turn with each other. Mountain degus have no special ability to dig with their claws, and their burrows are often short. They often make their homes in caves and under rocks. Members of a social group communicate through gurgles, twitters and squeaks. The mountain degu's closest relatives are the rodents in the genera Octodon, Spalacopus, and Aconaemys.

Mountain degus have little impact on human society. They are a potential carrier of the parasitic species Trypanosoma cruzi, which can cause Chagas disease in humans. They are also host to fleas and lice. The mountain degu population is not threatened by anything, and it can be found in some protected areas, leading the International Union for Conservation of Nature to classify it as a least-concern species.

== Taxonomy and etymology ==
The mountain degu was first described in 1844 as a member of the genus Octodon, having been given the scientific name Octodon gliroides by the French naturalists Paul Gervais and Alcide d'Orbigny. The species name, gliroides, was given due to the animal's similar appearance to that of a dormouse (gliris in Latin). The etymology of the name gliroides comes from a combination of the Latin gliris, 'dormouse' with the Greek suffixes -o and eidos, which indicate "likeness of form". The type locality where it was first identified is the Andes in La Paz, Bolivia.

Octodontomys, a genus created in 1903 by American zoologist Theodore Sherman Palmer, comes from the Ancient Greek ὀκτώ (oktṓ), meaning 'eight', ὀδούς (odoús), meaning 'tooth', and μῦς (mûs), meaning 'mouse'. The genus was created to replace the earlier-used name Neoctodon, which was already in use as a genus of beetles from an 1892 work by entomologist Ernest Marie Louis Bedel. The British zoologist Oldfield Thomas had used the name Neoctodon in his 1901 description of the mountain degu (as the new species Neoctodon simonsi, named in honor of the collector Perry O. Simons), which he corrected to the currently used name, Octodontomys gliroides, in his 1913 article On small mammals collected in Jujuy by Señor E. Budin. Thomas noted that the species was "strikingly different" from members of Octodon, and differentiated it based on its "paler colour, whiter belly, and longer, more bushy tail".

The common name "degu" is first recorded from the period between 1835 and 1845, and originates from the Mapuche word deuñ or dewit. Over time, the word changed through its use in Chilean Spanish. Recorded common names for the species include long-tailed octodon, brush-tailed vizcacha rat, and Andean degu.

== Phylogeny ==
The phylogeny and placement of O. gliroides in relation to other octodontids was originally unclear. It was placed as the sole member of Octodontomys in 2005, and a study of mitochondrial DNA across the species' range published in 2016 solidified Octodontomys as a monophyletic group, albeit one with two distinct lineages, one of which is distributed across Bolivia and northern Chile, the other restricted to Argentina. These two lineages diverged roughly 0.69 million years ago. Compared to other rodents worldwide, Octodontomys has some similarities to the monophyletic dassie rat. The mountain degu has a diploid chromosome number of 38 and a fundamental number of 64. The 28S and 18S ribosomal RNA of the mountain degu have notably split or eliminated introns, a genetic feature shared only with the tuco-tucos.

The following cladogram is adapted from work done by Rivera and colleagues in 2014. The genus Octodontomys is considered, as of 2018, to be the most primitive among the octodontids. It is thought to have diverged from its sister clade, which includes the genera Octodon, Spalacopus, and Aconaemys, at a point roughly 5 to 7 million years ago. No fossils of O. gliroides are known, and all estimates of species divergence times are made based on genetic analyses.

- Octodontidae
  - - Octomys
    - - Pipanacoctomys
      - Tympanoctomys
  - - Octodontomys gliroides
    - - - Octodon
        - - - - Spalacopus
              - Aconaemys porteri
          - - Aconaemys fuscus
            - Aconaemys sagei

== Description ==
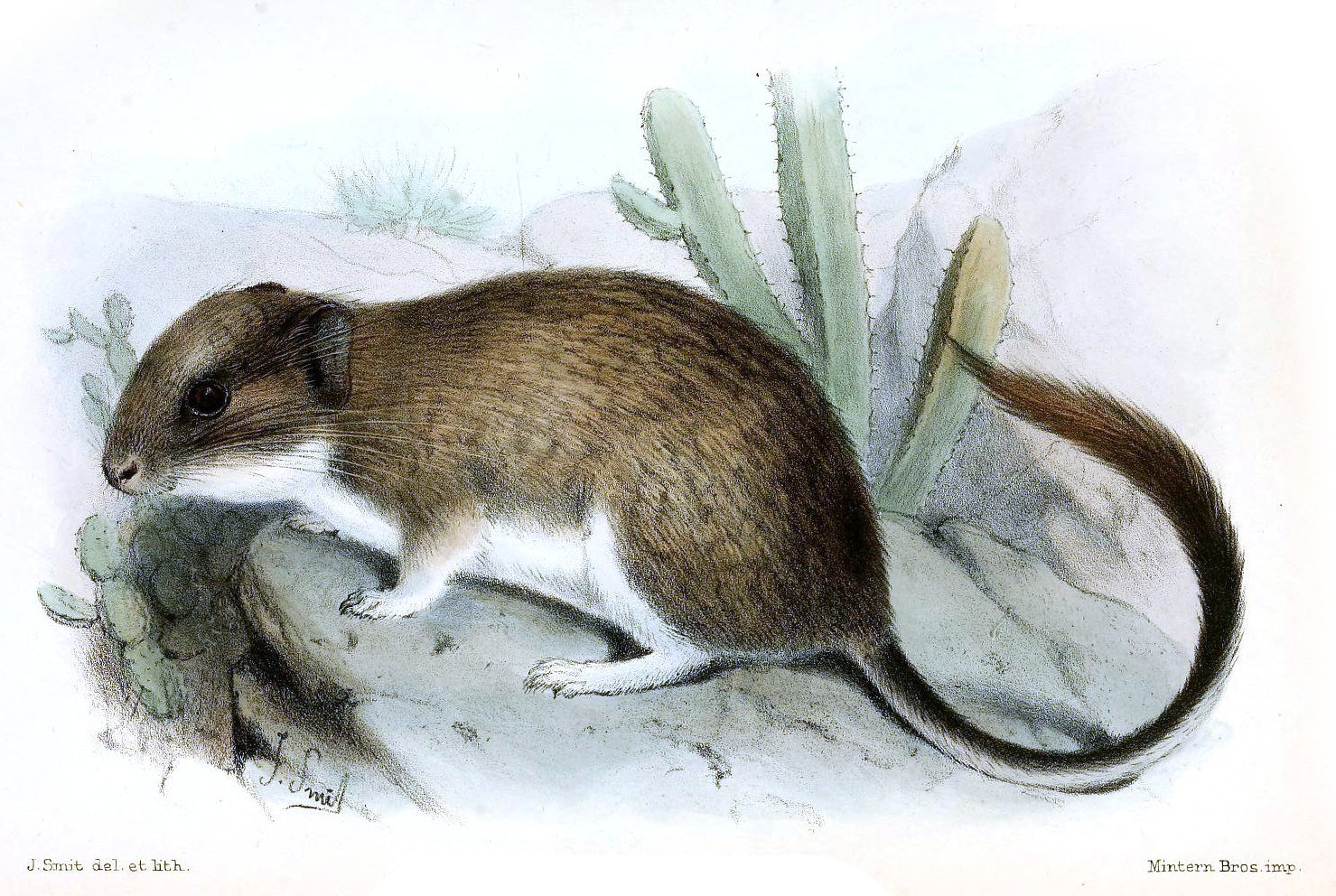
O. gliroides illustration by Joseph Smit, 1902

The mountain degu is a rodent of medium size with an adult length of 200 to 380 mm (8 to 15 in), including a tail of 100 to 190 mm (4 to 7 in), and a body weight in the range of 100 to 200 grams (4 to 7 oz). Its hairs are long and silky. The upper surface is greyish-brown, the chin is pure white, and the underparts are white with a grey base to the hairs. There is a tuft of white hair in front of the large ears, which are clad in short grey hair. The slender tail is bi-coloured (dark above and pale below) and has a tuft of brown or ochre hairs at the tip. Juveniles have darker fur above and greyer underparts. Their tails are brownish with a dark brown or black tufted tip. It is similar in appearance to other rodents in the octodontid family, bearing the closest resemblance to the mountain viscacha rat (Octomys mimax) and the viscacha rats in the genus Tympanoctomys. The mountain degu can be reliably distinguished from these rodents in that its molars are asymmetrical when occluded, while other octodontids display more of a fiugre-8 pattern.

Mountain degus have a dental formula of 1.0.1.31.0.1.3 × 2 = 20, with two incisors, no canines, two premolars, and six molars on each side of their jaw for a total of 20 teeth. The mountain degu has some distinctive dental and skeletal traits, as its molariform (premolar and molar) teeth lack as many folds as are found in other octodontids. Additionally, the first molariform tooth is inclined backwards near the socket (in the alveolar portion). The mountain degu's auditory bullae (bone structures that enclose part of the ear canal) are on average 14.6 mm (0.57 in) in diameter, being of medium size and slightly smaller than those found in other octodontids adapted to arid climates. The incisors constantly grow throughout the mountain degu's life and are hypsodont, adapted to consuming plenty of cellulose.

== Distribution and habitat ==
This species is found in the mountainous areas of southwestern Bolivia, northwestern Argentina and northern Chile. It has a wide altitudinal range, occurring at 200 to 300 metres (660 to 980 ft) in Jujuy Province in Argentina, and up to 4,400 metres (14,400 ft) in Potosí Department in Bolivia.

As the only species of octodontid found in the higher parts of its range, it inhabits dry rocky areas with tall cacti, shrubs and herbs. It is found in both the Atacama Desert of Chile and the Puna grassland habitats of Bolivia, and is especially well suited for xeric habitats within and east of the Andes mountain range. Populations of mountain degus are separated from each other by natural features such as unvegetated salt flats, rivers, mountains, and floodplains, with the major barriers between Argentinian populations and the populations found in Bolivia and Chile being the San Juan River and high mountain ranges at the Chile-Argentina border.

== Behaviour and diet ==
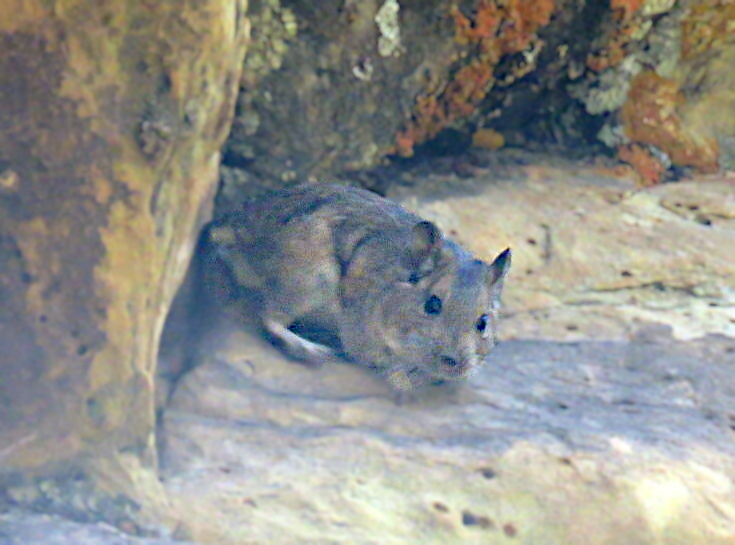
A mountain degu near Yavi, Jujuy Province, Argentina

The mountain degu is a nocturnal, herbivorous rodent, being most active just after sunset. It does not have any special adaptations of skull or limbs for tunnelling, but digs short burrows and lives under rocks and in caves. Its tail can be autotomised, and it can be used as a prop when climbing. It is a sociable animal and vocally communicates by means of a range of low, medium and high-pitched gurgles, twitters and squeaks, similar to the common degu and various species in genus Cavia. Social groups of the mountain degu range from 2 to 4 individuals that share a burrow system together to rest and hide from predators. Female mountain degus have a smaller home range than that of males. The mountain degu is notably less social than the common degu. Family groups engage in play shortly after waking from sleep, with individuals locking incisors with and riding on each other. Like other octodontids, the mountain degu takes dust baths, with each member of a family unit taking turns at the same location.

The mountain degu feeds on the leaves and bark of shrubs, Acacia sheaths, and cactus fruits. It can obtain sufficient moisture from its food, particularly cactus, to satisfy its water requirements. Much of the degu's water comes from the tissues of cacti in the genera Cereus and Opuntia. Cacti are largely preferred during the winter, and in the summer, mountain degus are found to feed upon a mixture of plants that undergo crassulacean acid metabolism and cool season grasses.

Mountain degu young in various stages of development have been found in November, and pregnant females and young in both January and May. A gestation period of 100–109 days has been reported with a litter size of one to three pups. The pups are precocial when born, already having their eyes open and being well-furred.

== Relationship with humans ==
The mountain degu hosts parasites that are infectious to humans, such as the Chagas disease–causing Trypanosoma cruzi. It is also parasitized by bloodsucking fleas in genus Ectinorus and lice in the genera Ferrisella. Otherwise, it has little to no societal impact, similar to other degus.

== Conservation ==
The mountain degu is common within its distribution and has no known threats. The International Union for Conservation of Nature considers it to be a least-concern species because it is widely distributed, occurs in some protected areas, and can tolerate changes in its habitat. The mountain degu population is not declining at an appreciable rate, and there are no conservation actions being taken towards it.
