= Degu =

The Degus are a group of octodontid rodents in the Octodontidae family, but historically referred to the common degu (O. degus).

Degus are placed in two genera:

- Genus Octodon
  - O. bridgesi, Bridges's degu, found in Argentina and Chile
  - O. degus, the common degu, historically referred to as just "degu", found in central Chile
  - O. lunatus, the moon-toothed degu, a nocturnal animal found in central Chile
  - O. pacificus, the Mocha Island degu or Pacific degu, a recently discovered species found exclusively on Mocha Island, Chile
- Genus Octodontomys
  - O. gliroides, the mountain degu, found in the foothills of the Andes in Argentina, Bolivia and Chile.
