= Ricardo Ojeda's degu =

Scientific classification
- Kingdom: Animalia
- Phylum: Chordata
- Class: Mammalia
- Order: Rodentia
- Family: Octodontidae
- Genus: Octodon
- Species: O. ricardojeda

Binomial name
- Octodon ricardojeda D'Elía, Teta, Verzi, Cadenillas & Patton, 2020

Species of rodent

Ricardo Ojeda's degu (Octodon ricardojeda) is a species of rodent in the family Octodontidae. It is found in a small portion of eastern Chile and western Argentina, being the only degu found outside of Chile. It was named after Argentine mammalogist Ricardo Ojeda.

It was formerly thought to be a population of Bridges's degu (O. bridgesi) but in 2020, a genomic study found it to be a distinct species. Phylogenetic evidence supports it being the sister species to the Pacific degu (R. pacificus), from which it diverged during the early Pleistocene, about 1.97 million years ago. Fossil records of this species are known from Holocene archaeological sites in Neuquén and Río Negro, Argentina; this indicates that the species had a slightly wider distribution in prehistoric times.

In Argentina it inhabits semiopen areas in southern beech forests, such as those found in Lanín National Park, as well as sandy hillocks within patches of Chusquea bamboo. Although it is a primarily terrestrial species, it can climb. It is not as of yet known if it excavates the burrows that it inhabits or only occupies those dug by other animals.

Due to its small range and being known only from a few localities (although potential unsurveyed habitat exists), it has been recommended that this species be classified as Vulnerable on the IUCN Red List.

== See also ==
- List of living mammal species described in the 2020s
