= Thomas Bridges (botanist) =

Thomas Bridges (22 May 1807 – 9 November 1865) was an English Victorian era botanist and traveling specimen collector. He is most notable for his discovery of new plant and animal species from South America in the Andes of Chile, Peru, and Bolivia, as well as in California. He was elected a Fellow of the Linnean Society in 1844. He collected at various times (after 1856) in the Santa Cruz Mountains. The specimens he collected were sent back to Europe for identification.

Bridges emigrated to California in 1856, the specimens collected during this period up to his 1865 death were presented to the National Herbarium at Washington by his widow. His wife's uncle was Hugh Cuming.

Bridges is reported to have been very excited about the prospect of discovering new species, writing in a letter dated 1858 from California to William Jackson Hooker at Kew Gardens:

"I can scarcely describe to you how pleasing and gratifying it has been to me to learn that in my collections you have found some new and rare plants--I was partially under the impression that from the labours of Douglas, Hartweg, Jeffrey, Lobb and other travelers from Europe with the many United States Exploring Expeditions that little or nothing remained to be discovered and only gleanings were left to those of us of the present day."

As a result of his collecting, several new species were named after him, including:

- Octodon bridgesii Bridges's degu
- Copiapoa bridgesii Copiapoa de Bridges
- Penstemon bridgesii
- Pomacea bridgesii Spike-topped apple snail
