= Ectinorus =

Scientific classification
- Kingdom: Animalia
- Phylum: Arthropoda
- Clade: Pancrustacea
- Class: Insecta
- Order: Siphonaptera
- Family: Rhopalopsyllidae
- Genus: Ectinorus; Jordan, 1942

Type species
- Pulex cocyti Rothschild, 1904

Genus of fleas

Ectinorus is a genus of fleas in the family Rhopalopsyllidae (marsupial fleas), erected by Karl Jordan in 1942. It is endemic to South America, specifically the Andes and surrounding regions, especially Chile. The genus includes species that are parasitic to rodents and are a vector for the bubonic plague. At least one species within Ectinorus is viable at altitudes above 3,000 metres (9,800 ft).
