= Heidelberg Zoo =

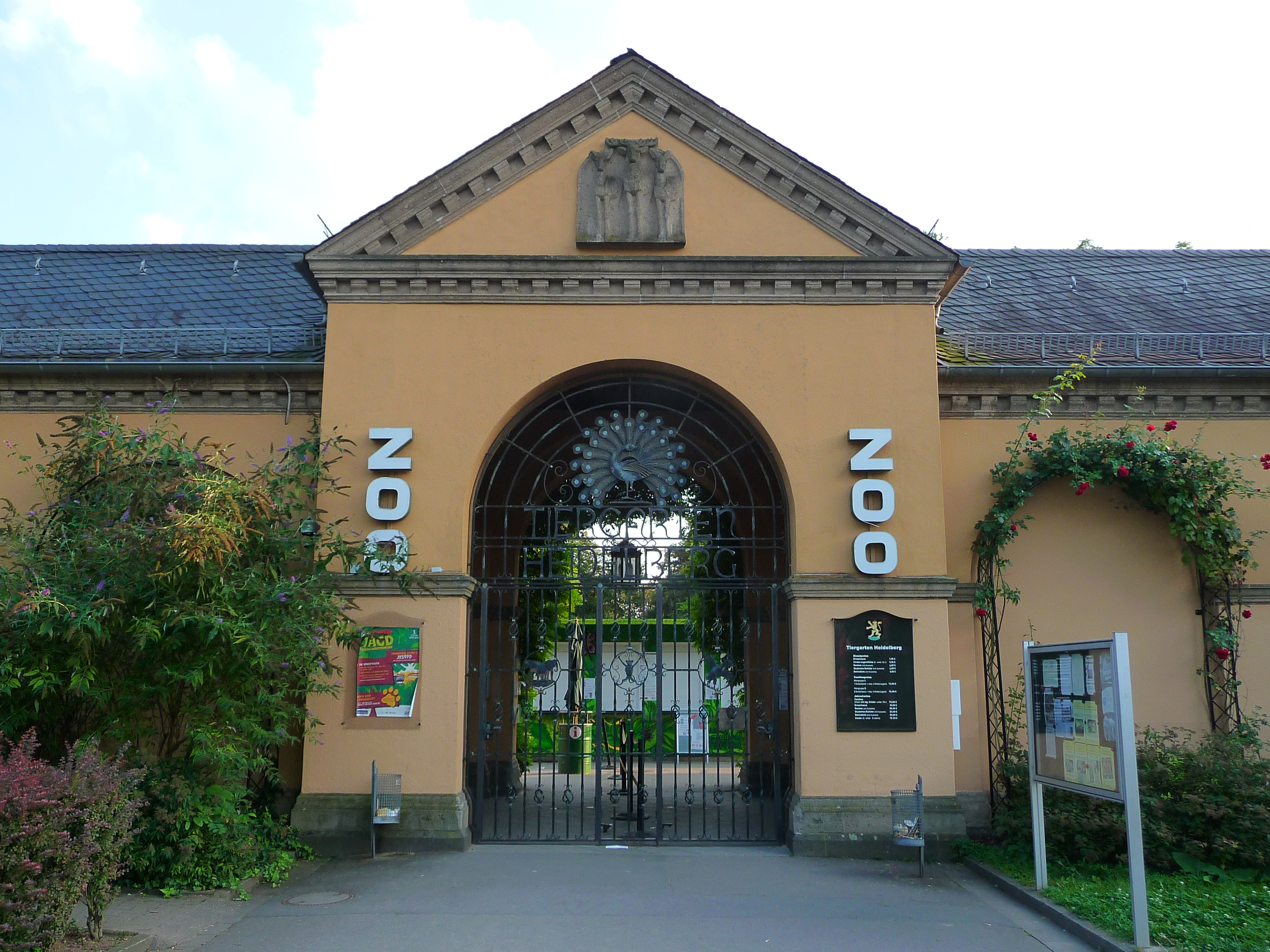
- Heidelberg Zoo entrance
- Interactive map of Heidelberg Zoo
- 49°24′55″N 8°39′39″E
- Date opened: 20 November 1934
- Location: Tiergartenstraße 3, 69120 Heidelberg, Germany
- Land area: 10.2 ha (0.102 km^{2})
- No. of animals: 1443 (2012)
- No. of species: 174 (2012)
- Annual visitors: 610 000
- Owner: Tiergarten Heidelberg gGmbH
- Website: www.zoo-heidelberg.de

Heidelberg Zoo is a zoo in Germany which was founded in 1933 and opened for the public on 20 November 1934. Since 1998, the zoo director has been Klaus Wünnemann.

== History ==
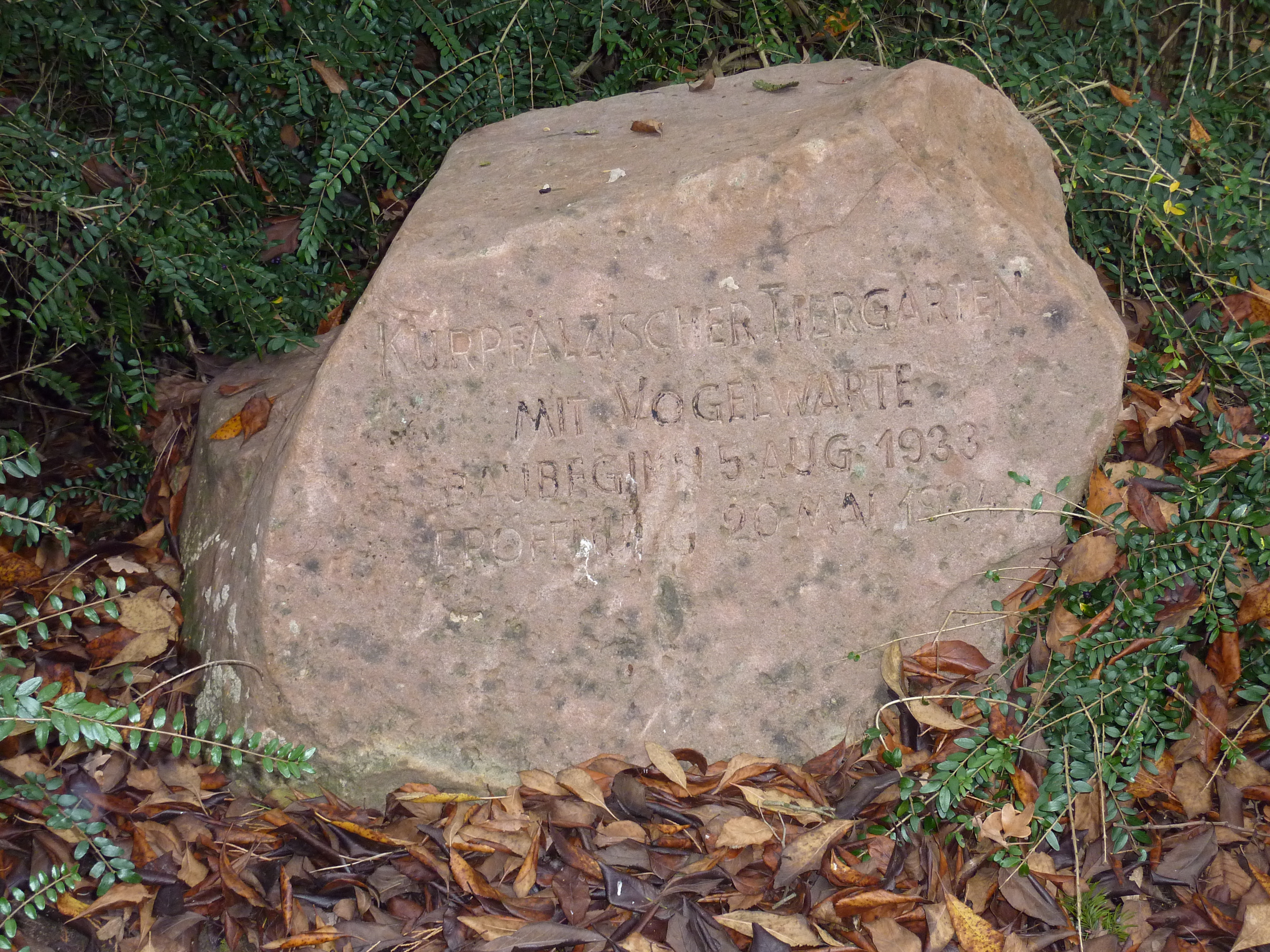
Memorial stone from the foundation of Kurpfälzischen Tiergartens

The zoo was created as a foundation, initiated by the ornithologist, Otto Fehringer.

Fehringer was supported by Carl Bosch, the German chemist, engineer, and Nobel laureate in chemistry.

During the first years, Heidelberg Zoo was suffering from money shortage, which even worsened after 1940 and World War II.

In March 1945, the zoo was totally destroyed during bombings.

In 1972, a new director was appointed, and a reformation began.

Several new enclosures were added, like a new enclosure for sea lions 1973, Africa enclosure 1977, carnivores 1978, brown bears 1981, bird enclosure 1985, primates 1988, followed by a new tiger enclosure and other buildings.

A new elephant house was opened in 2010, where only young elephant bulls are kept, as part of the EEP breeding programme for Asian elephants.

Till 2019 the lion paddock was expanded. The neighboring porcupine and meerkat paddocks were redesigned in the same year and an exhibition dealing with the zoo's history was opened to the public.

A new petting zoo was opened in 2021. A larger gorilla paddock is planned for the future.

== Pictures ==
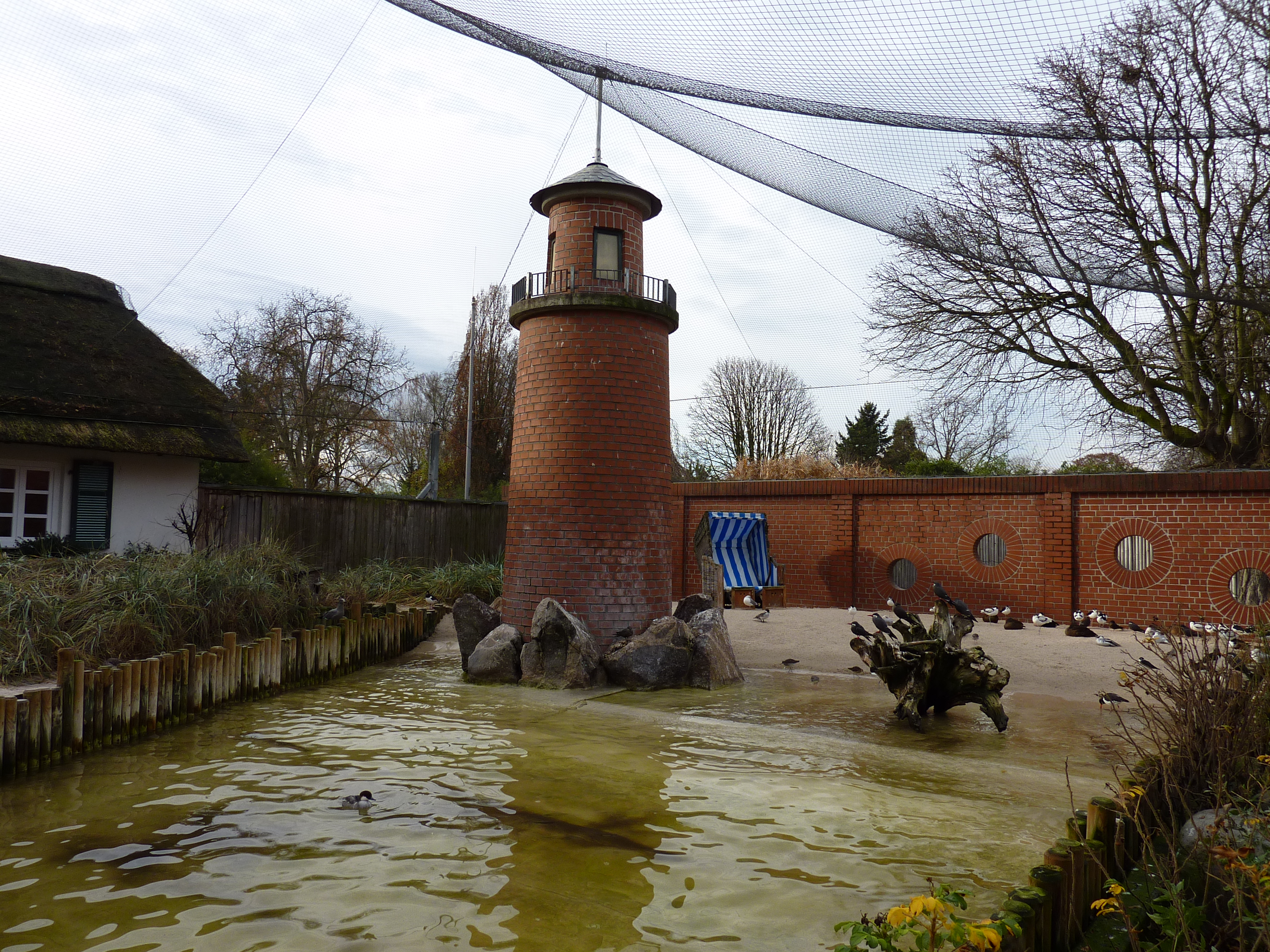
Coastal panorama

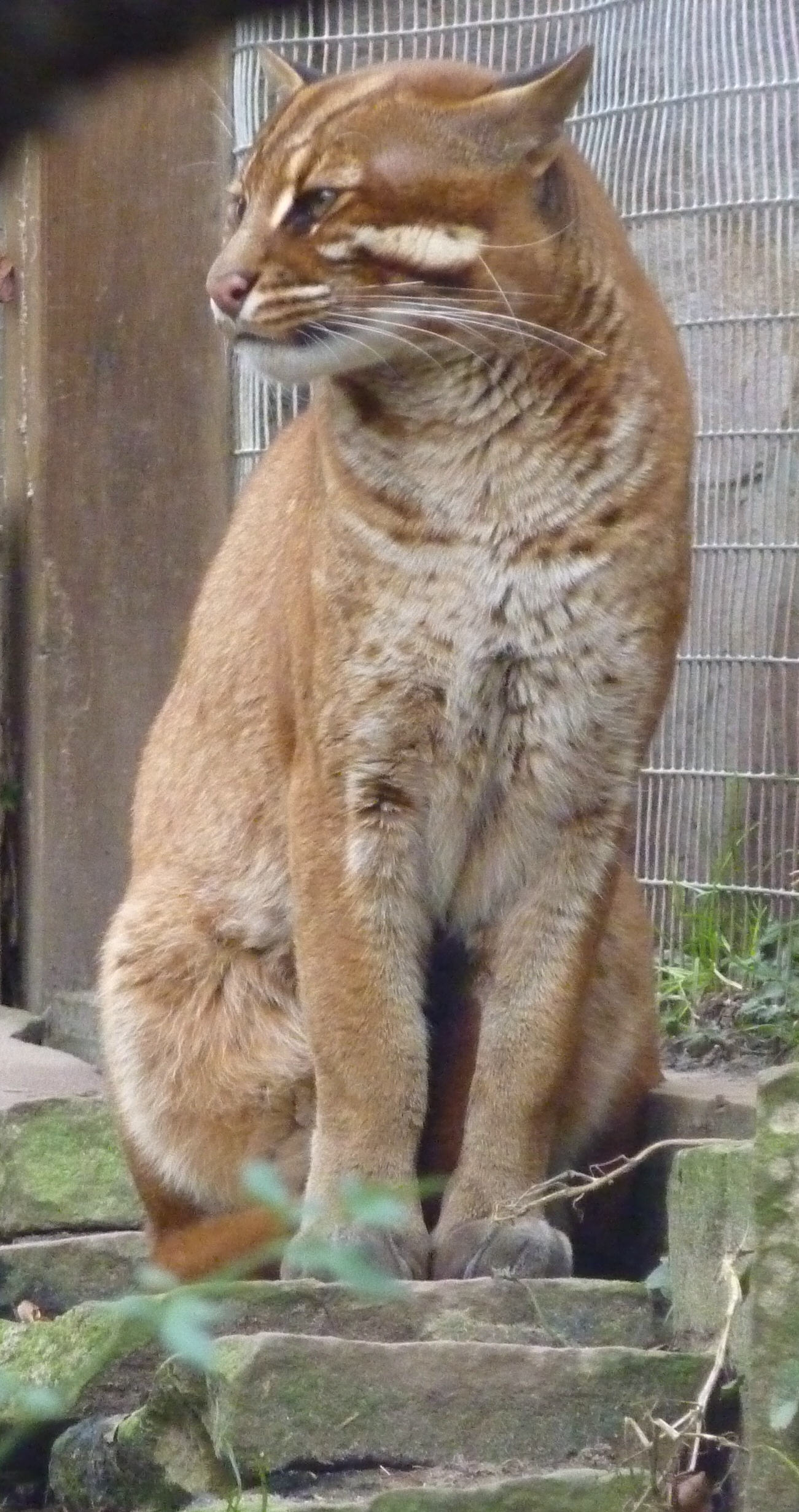
Asian golden cat

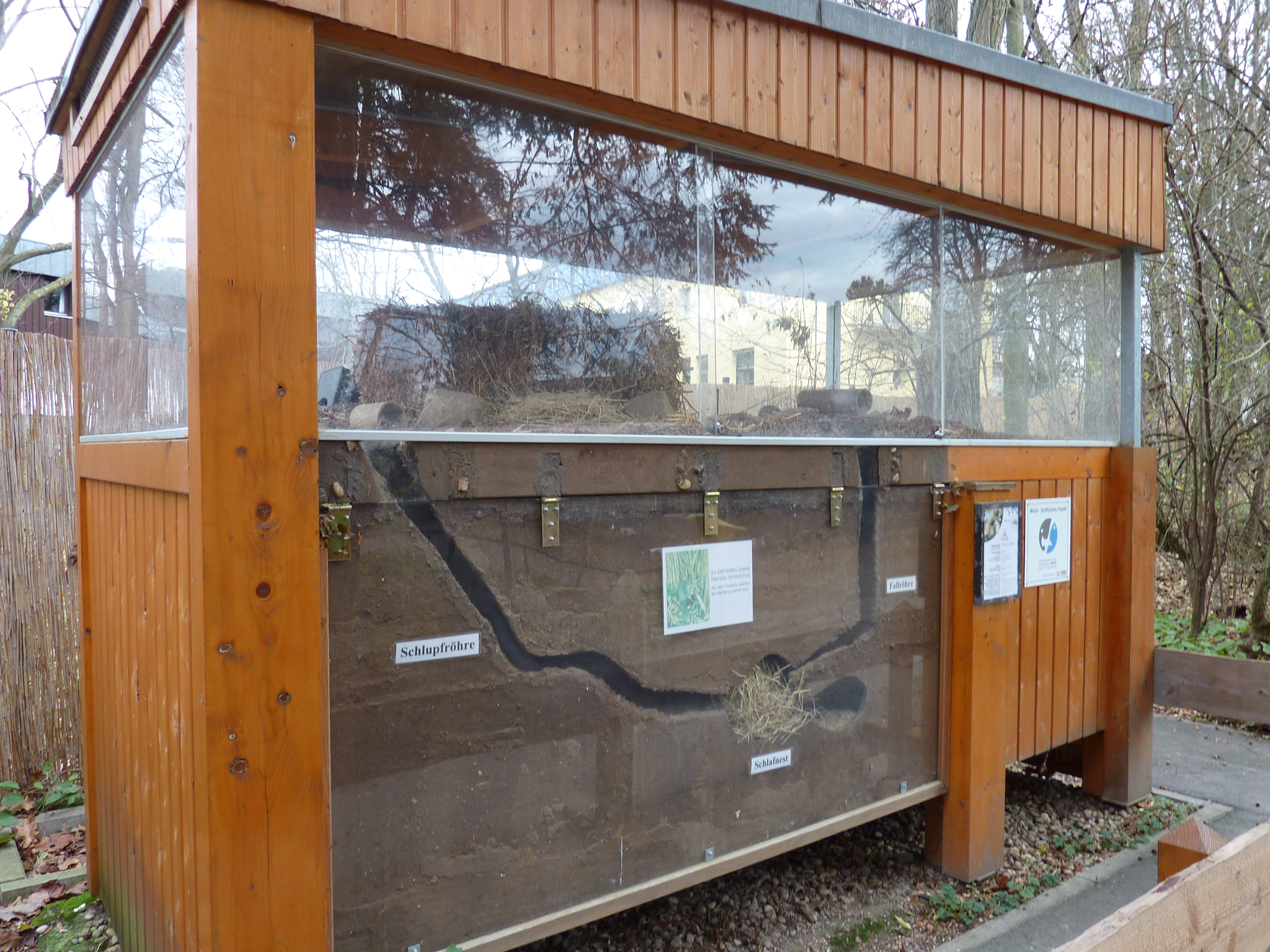
Field Hamster Rescue Center

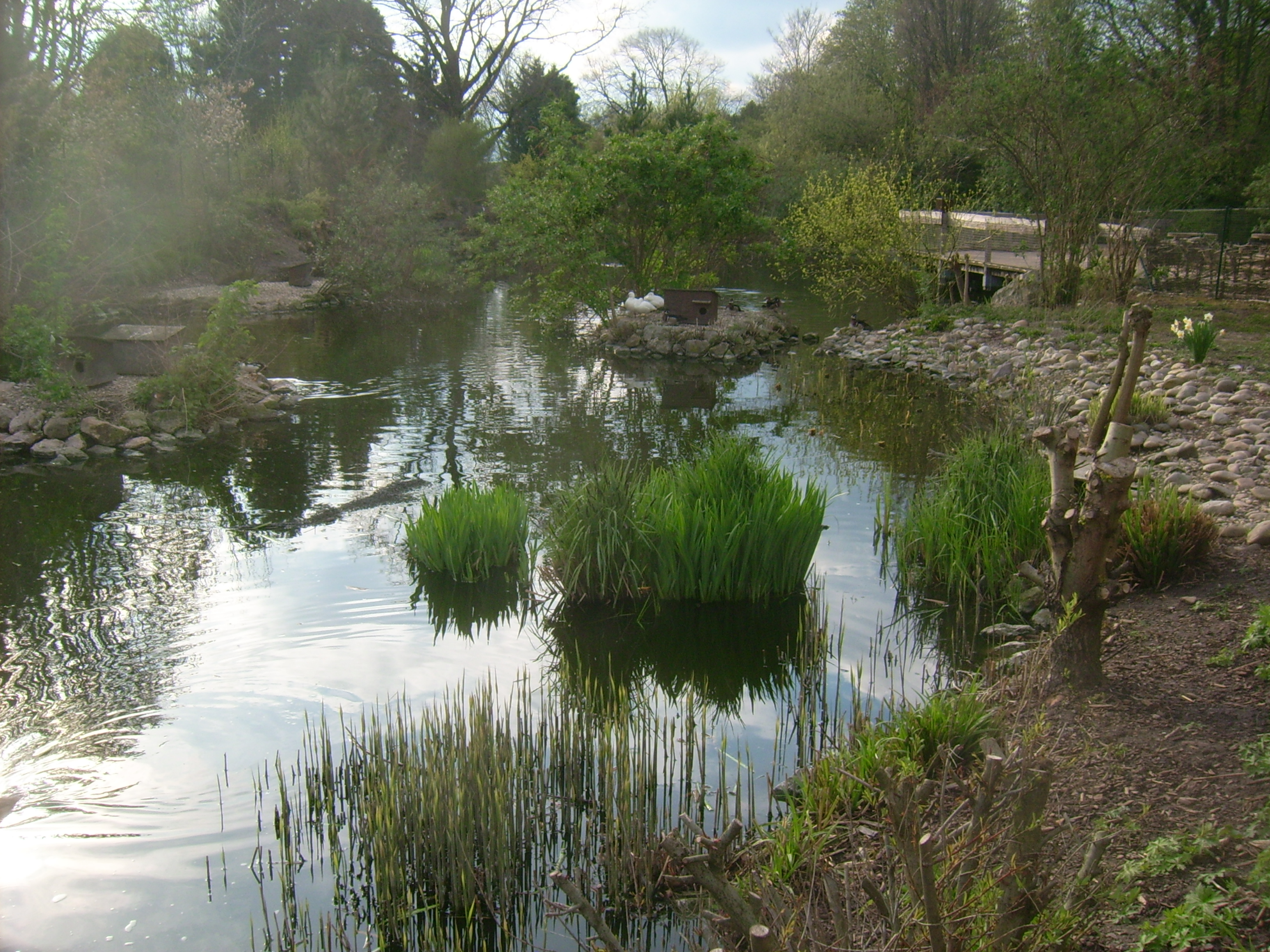
Pond

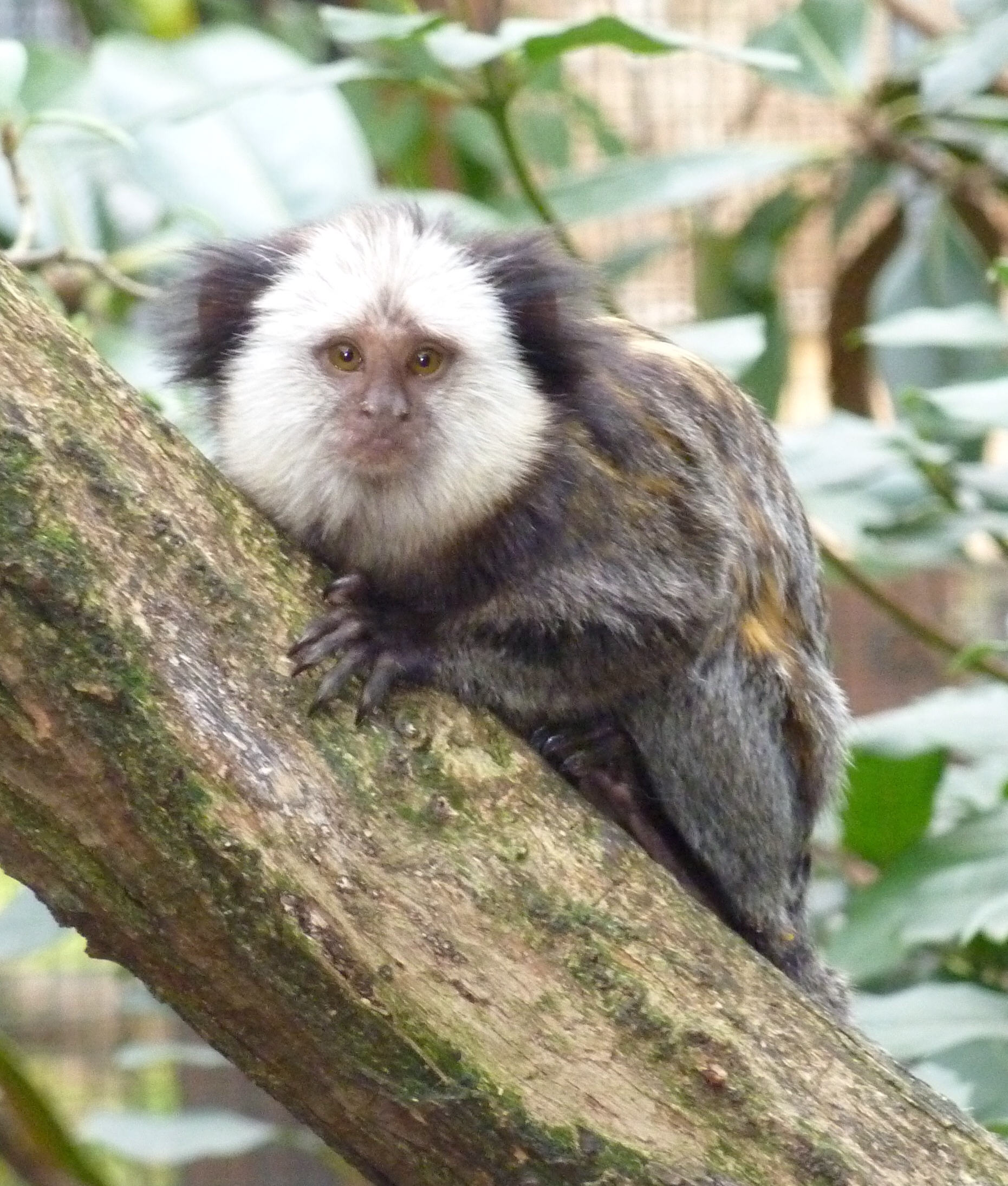
Tamarines in a freely accessible cage

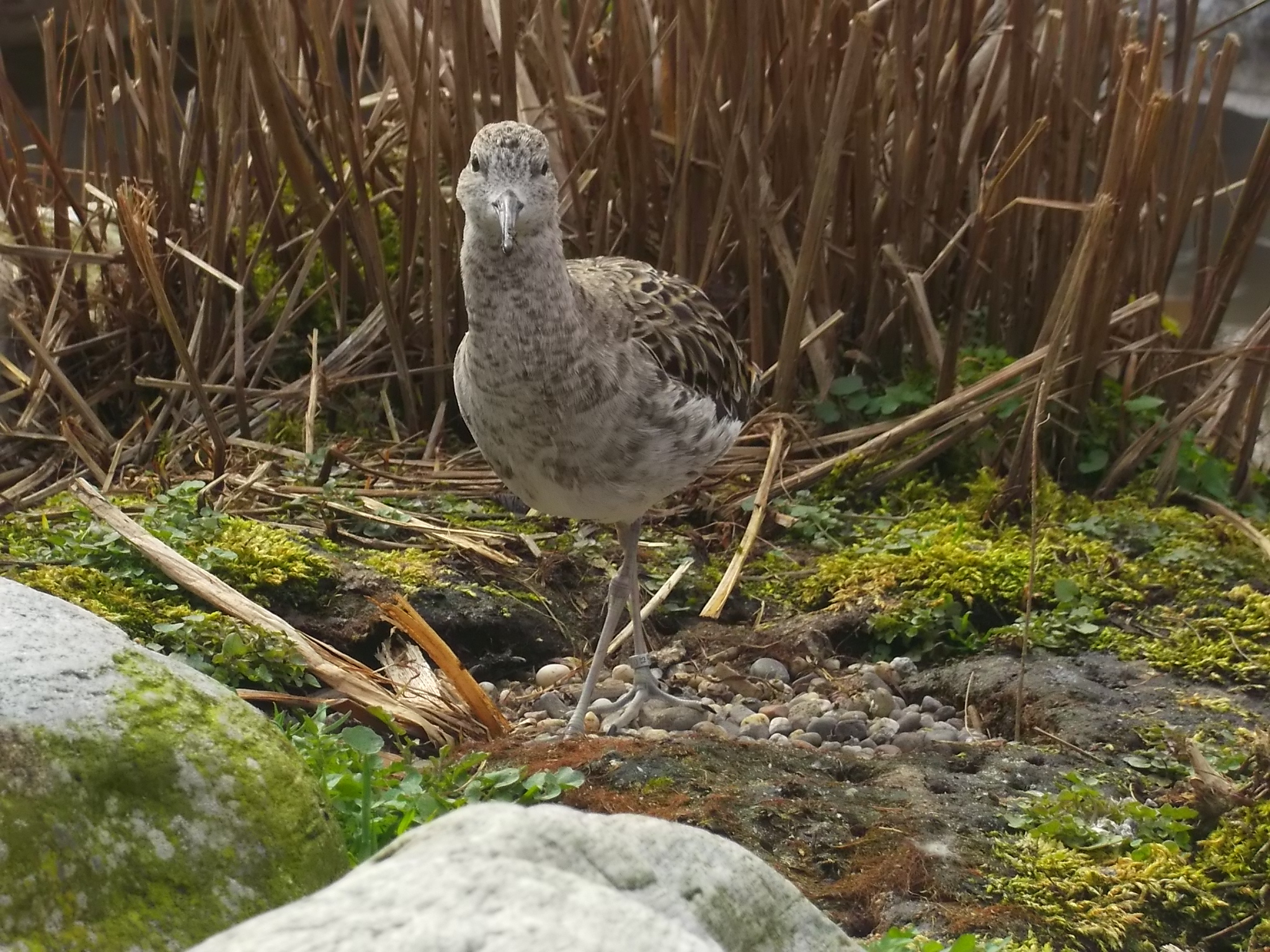
A ruff (Philomachus pugnax)
