= Moon-toothed degu =

Conservation status
- Near Threatened (IUCN 3.1)

Scientific classification
- Kingdom: Animalia
- Phylum: Chordata
- Class: Mammalia
- Infraclass: Placentalia
- Order: Rodentia
- Family: Octodontidae
- Genus: Octodon
- Species: O. lunatus

Binomial name
- Octodon lunatus Osgood, 1943
- Octodon lunatus range

Species of rodent

The moon-toothed degu (Octodon lunatus) is a species of rodent in the family Octodontidae. It is endemic to Chile, occurring in mountainous areas along the Pacific coast in the central part of the country.

== Biology and physiology ==
Unlike its close relative the common degu, the moon-toothed degu is nocturnal (active at night). The ventral fur of this species has been found to be much less reflective of UV light than other octodontids, most likely as a result of its nocturnal habits.

The moon-toothed degu has deep molar indentations but lacks a fold on the inside of the last molar.

== Habitat ==
The species is less widely distributed in Chile than the common degu and inhabits dense scrubland near the coast. Habitat ranges from sea level to 1,200 m in the Andes.
