= Bridges's degu =

Conservation status
- Vulnerable (IUCN 3.1)(includes ricardojedai)

Scientific classification
- Kingdom: Animalia
- Phylum: Chordata
- Class: Mammalia
- Infraclass: Placentalia
- Order: Rodentia
- Family: Octodontidae
- Genus: Octodon
- Species: O. bridgesii

Binomial name
- Octodon bridgesii Waterhouse, 1845
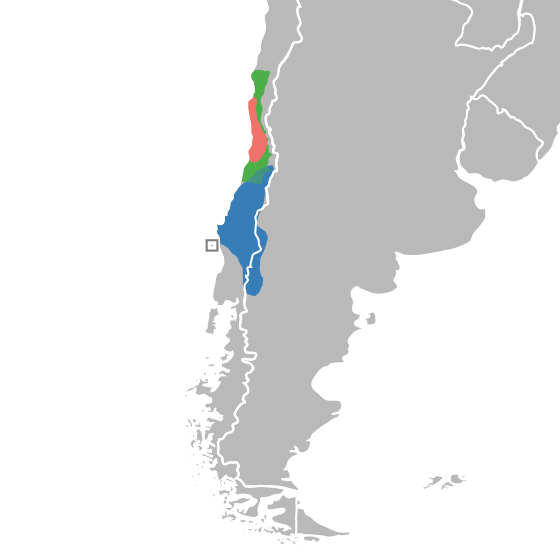
- Octodon distribution O. bridgesii in blue

Species of rodent

Bridges's degu (Octodon bridgesii) is a species of rodent in the family Octodontidae. It is found in southern Chile. The species was named after Thomas Bridges.

== Taxonomy ==
Ricardo Ojeda's degu (O. ricardojedai), which is found in Argentina and Chile, was formerly considered a population of O. bridgesii, but was described as a distinct species in 2020.

== Biology and physiology ==
Unlike its close relative, the common degu, Bridges' degu is nocturnal.

Bridges's degu has deep molar indentations and has a deep fold on the inside of the last molar.

== Habitat ==
The species is less widely distributed in Chile than the common degu and inhabits rocky, forested areas and some open farmland, although it is far less well adapted for digging but does have some climbing ability. Deforestation may be contributing to the decline of this species.
