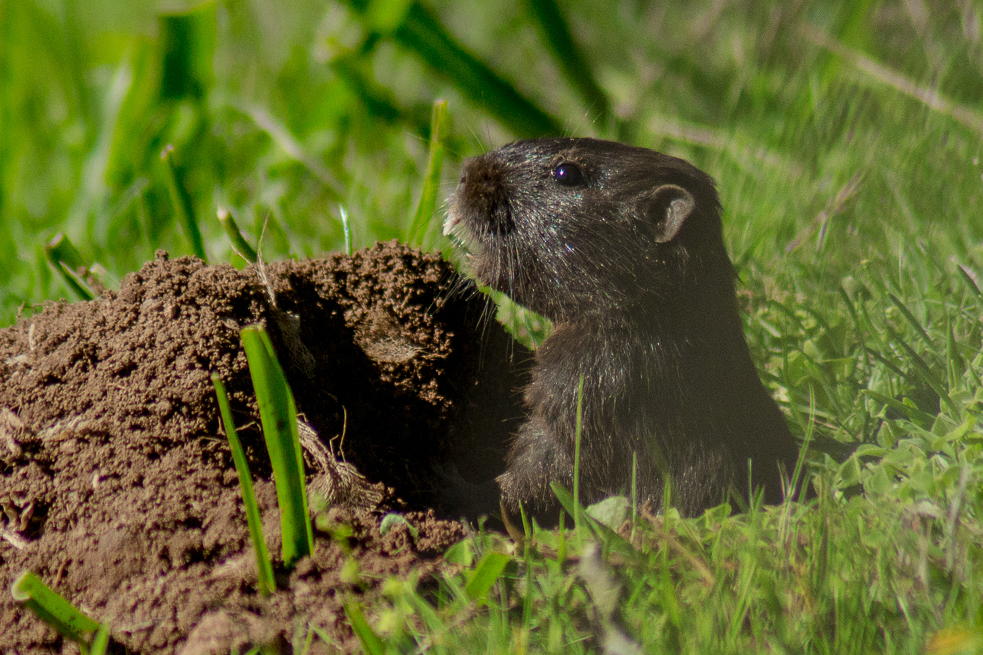
- Coruro emerging from a burrow in Valparaíso Region, Chile

Conservation status
- Least Concern (IUCN 3.1)

Scientific classification
- Kingdom: Animalia
- Phylum: Chordata
- Class: Mammalia
- Infraclass: Placentalia
- Order: Rodentia
- Family: Octodontidae
- Genus: Spalacopus; Wagler, 1832
- Species: S. cyanus

Binomial name
- Spalacopus cyanus (Molina, 1782)
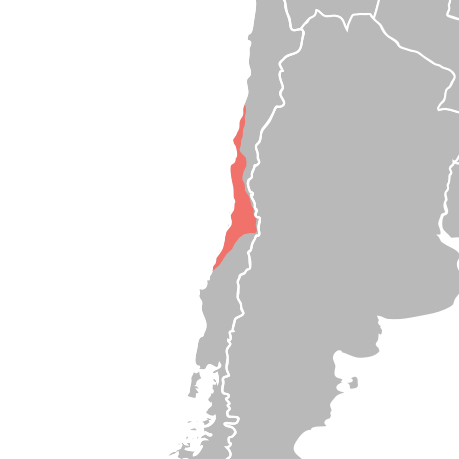
- Spalacopus cyanus distribution

= Coruro =

Genus of rodents

The coruro (Spalacopus cyanus) is a species of rodent in the family Octodontidae. It is the only species in the genus Spalacopus. The species is endemic to central Chile, where it has been found in a wide variety of habitats, from coastal to montane. It is fossorial and lives in colonies.

== Description ==
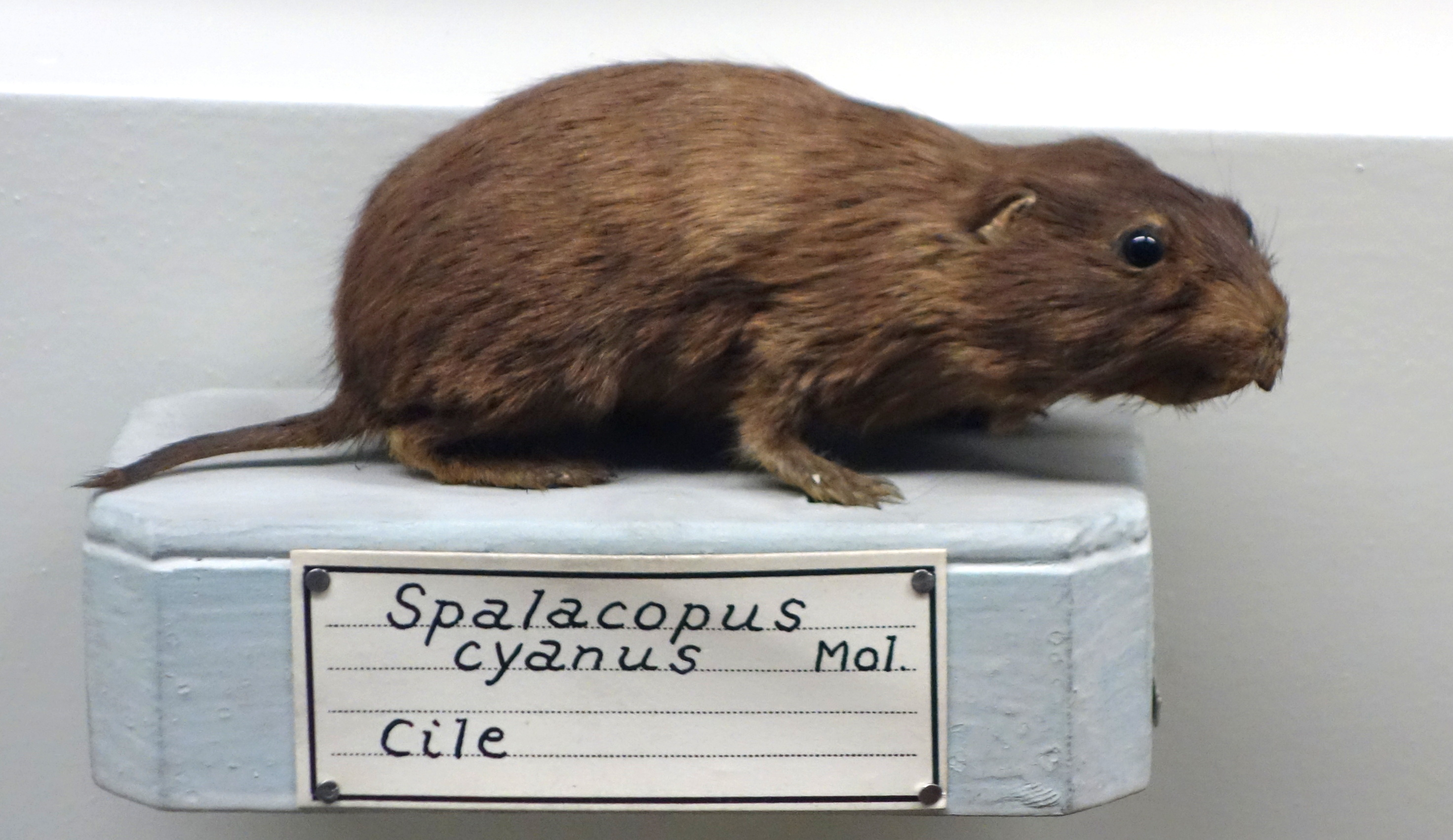
Taxidermied specimen

Coruros are robust rodents with large heads, short necks and stocky bodies. The fur is short and dark brown, turning blackish on the feet. Their eyes and ears are small and their tails are short and smooth. They are strongly modified for life underground. They have large incisors that curve forward and which are used to loosen soil and gnaw through roots, strong forelimbs for digging and powerful hind limbs for moving soil and kicking it out of the entrance to the burrow. They weigh between 82 and 118 grams (0.18 and 0.26 lb). Their molars have reentrant folds that do not meet in the middle. Their tails are scaly and hairless. They can be either black or dark brown.

== Distribution and habitat ==
Coruros occur along the coast from Alicahue (32°19'S) to Los Cipreses (34°01'S), and in the Andes up to 3500 m altitude from Alicahue (32°19'S) to Los Cipreses (34°01'S). It inhabits a range of habitats including alpine grasslands in the mountains, acacia savannah in the Chilean Central Valley, semi-stabilized sand dunes and coastal grassland.

== Ecology ==
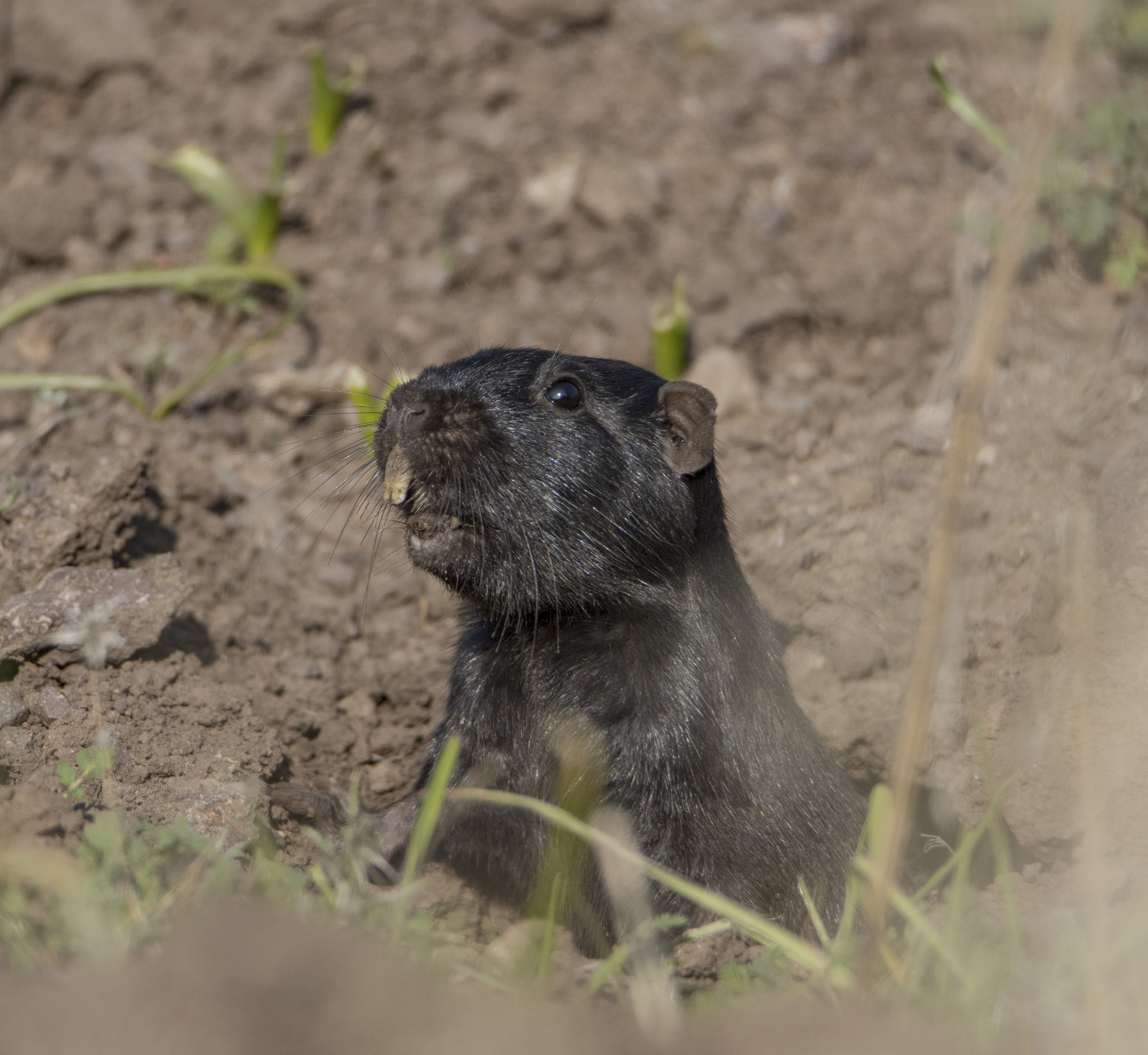
In Chacabuco Province, Chile

Coruros are colonial rodents, a number of individuals occupying a single burrow system. They are also unusual amongst rodents in that they are nomadic; when their food is becoming exhausted in one locality, they move as a group to another locality and create a new burrow. They live in smaller colonies that broke up from a large population. They leave behind bulbs in order for them to grow, thus allowing them to return to the area for vegetation. It is a vocal species, emitting a range of distinctive calls. They tend to feed on Huilli or other vegetation. They have predators such as hawks, owls, and wild cats. They have a certain reproduction time from June to March. They can produce up to six offspring. Their gestation period last about 77 days. The offsprings eyes open about four days after birth. They are not currently endangered.

Coruros feed entirely underground on grasses, herbs, roots and bulbs of geophytes such as Leucocoryne ixioides (which forms the bulk of its diet), Dioscorea longipes, or species of Libertia, Sisyrinchium or Alophia.
