= Sage's rock rat =

Conservation status
- Data Deficient (IUCN 3.1)

Scientific classification
- Kingdom: Animalia
- Phylum: Chordata
- Class: Mammalia
- Infraclass: Placentalia
- Order: Rodentia
- Family: Octodontidae
- Genus: Aconaemys
- Species: A. sagei

Binomial name
- Aconaemys sagei Pearson, 1984
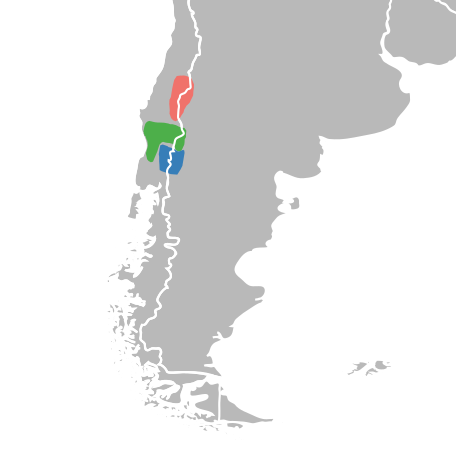
- Aconaemys distribution A. sagei in green

Species of rodent

Sage's rock rat (Aconaemys sagei) is a species of rodent in the family Octodontidae. It is found in Argentina and possibly Chile.
