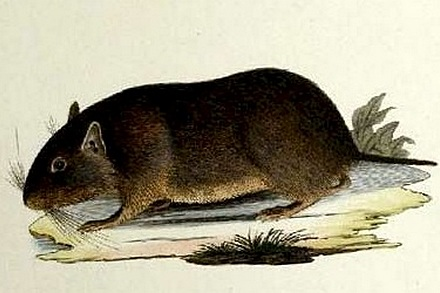
- Aconaemys fuscus

Scientific classification
- Kingdom: Animalia
- Phylum: Chordata
- Class: Mammalia
- Infraclass: Placentalia
- Order: Rodentia
- Family: Octodontidae
- Genus: Aconaemys; Ameghino, 1891

Type species
- Schizodon fuscus Waterhouse, 1842

Species
- Aconaemys fuscus Aconaemys porteri Aconaemys sagei
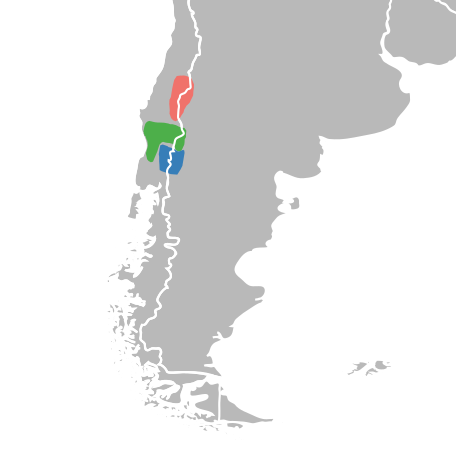
- Aconaemys distribution A. fuscus in red, A. sagei in green, A. porteri in blue

= Aconaemys =

Genus of rodents

Aconaemys is a genus of rodent in the family Octodontidae. It contains the following species:

- Chilean rock rat (Aconaemys fuscus)
- Porter's rock rat (Aconaemys porteri)
- Sage's rock rat (Aconaemys sagei)
