= Pacific degu =

Conservation status
- Critically Endangered (IUCN 3.1)

Scientific classification
- Kingdom: Animalia
- Phylum: Chordata
- Class: Mammalia
- Order: Rodentia
- Family: Octodontidae
- Genus: Octodon
- Species: O. pacificus

Binomial name
- Octodon pacificus R. Hutterer, 1994
- Octodon pacificus range

Species of rodent

The Pacific degu (Octodon pacificus), also known as the Mocha Island degu, is a species of rodent in the family Octodontidae. It is endemic to Mocha Island in Chile. Its natural habitat is subtropical or tropical moist lowland forests. It is threatened by habitat loss. It was classified in 1994 by Dr. Rainer Hutterer.

Like its close relative the common degu, the Mocha Island degu is diurnal (active during the day). This species is said to have relatively primitive octodontid features, including long fur and a tail lacking a substantial tuft, a feature common amongst other octodons.
