= Golden viscacha rat =

Conservation status
- Critically Endangered (IUCN 3.1)

Scientific classification
- Kingdom: Animalia
- Phylum: Chordata
- Class: Mammalia
- Order: Rodentia
- Family: Octodontidae
- Genus: Pipanacoctomys; Mares, Braun, Barquez, and Díaz, 2000
- Species: P. aureus

Binomial name
- Pipanacoctomys aureus Mares, Braun, Barquez, and Díaz, 2000
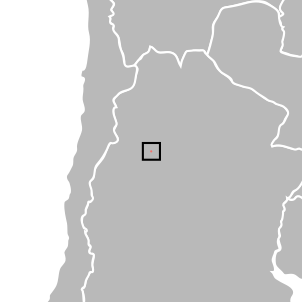
- Pipanacoctomys aureus distribution

Species of rodent

The golden viscacha rat or golden vizcacha rat (Pipanacoctomys aureus) is the single species of the genus Pipanacoctomys of the rodent family Octodontidae. It has 92 chromosomes and has been regarded as tetraploid (4x = 2n). This octodontid and its sister-species, the plains viscacha rat (Tympanoctomys barrerae) (2n = 102), may have arisen from the diploid mountain viscacha rat (Octomys mimax), (2x = 2n = 56) as a result of the doubling and subsequent loss of some chromosomes. However, some genetic studies have rejected any polyploidism in mammals as unlikely, and suggest that amplification and dispersion of repetitive sequences best explain the large genome size.

== Description ==
The golden viscacha rat grows to a head-and-body length of about 170 millimetres (7 in) with a tufted tail of about 140 millimetres (6 in). The dorsal fur is golden-blond and the underparts are white.

== Distribution and habitat ==
The species is known from Catamarca Province of northwestern Argentina, where specimens are known only from the Salar de Pipanaco, a salt flat. This habitat consists largely of low, salt-loving shrubs, and the soil consists of sand with high levels of salt. It feeds on the halophytic plants growing there. The genus is named after the locale, with octo being a reference to the figure-eight ridge on its cheek tooth.

== Status ==
The golden viscacha rat is only found within a very restricted area totalling less than 100 square kilometres (39 mi^{2}) and it actually occupies only about one tenth of that area. It lives among the salt-loving plants that live between the salt pans and the desert. It is threatened by conversion of its very restricted habitat to agricultural use, for the growing of olives, and its population trend is downwards. The International Union for Conservation of Nature has rated its conservation status as "critically endangered".
