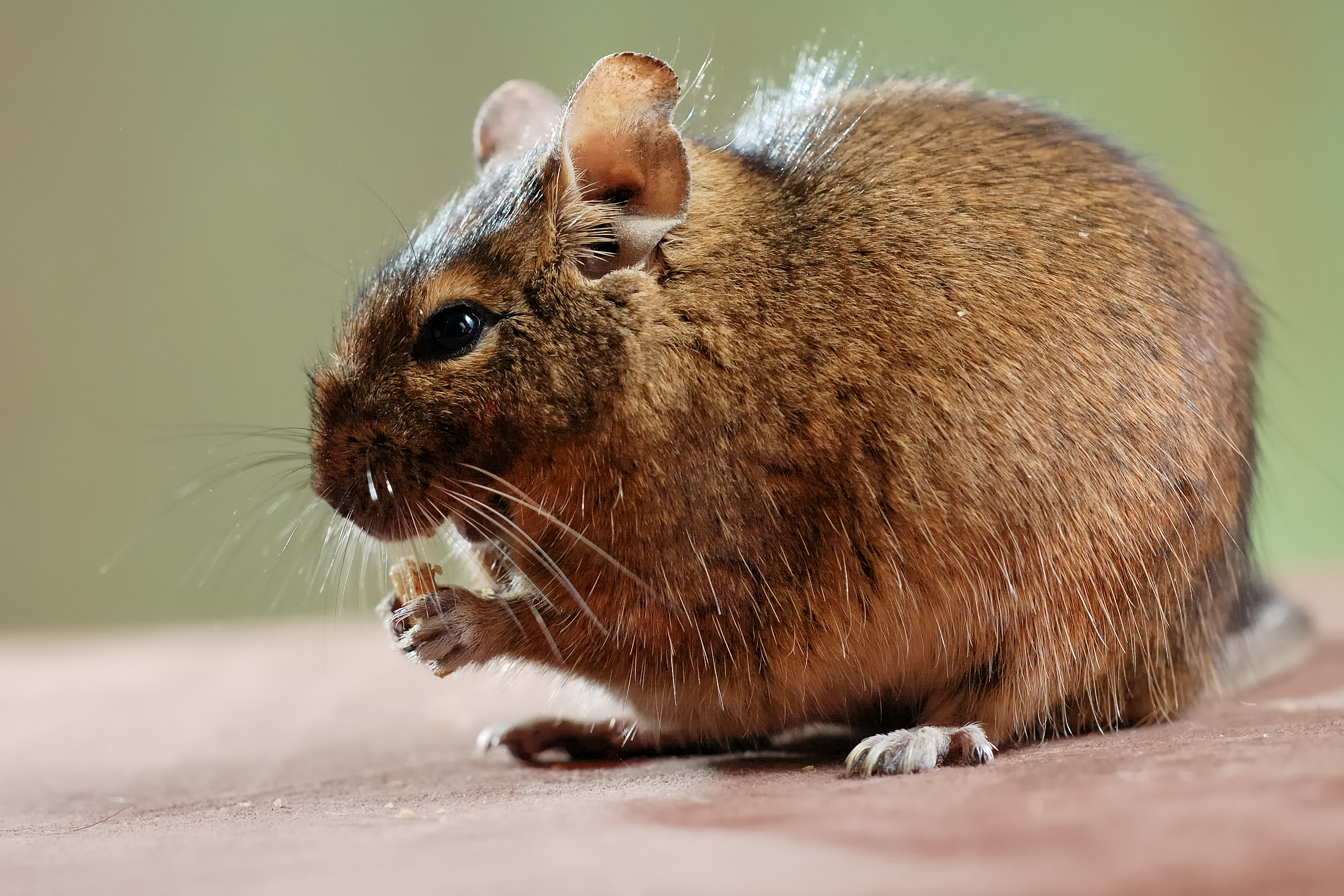
- Common degu, Octodon degus

Scientific classification
- Kingdom: Animalia
- Phylum: Chordata
- Class: Mammalia
- Infraclass: Placentalia
- Order: Rodentia
- Suborder: Hystricomorpha
- Infraorder: Hystricognathi
- Parvorder: Caviomorpha
- Superfamily: Octodontoidea
- Family: Octodontidae; Waterhouse, 1839

Type genus
- Octodon Bennett, 1823

Genera
- Aconaemys; Octodon; Octodontomys; Octomys; Pipanacoctomys; Spalacopus; Tympanoctomys
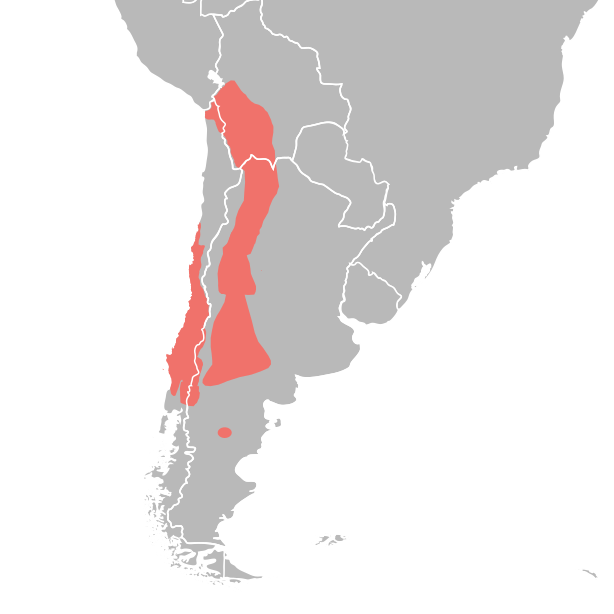
- Octodontidae distribution

= Octodontidae =

Octodontids Temporal range: Late Miocene–Recent

Family of rodents

Octodontidae (from Ancient Greek ὀκτώ (oktṓ), meaning "eight", and ὀδούς (odoús), meaning "tooth") is a family of rodents, restricted to southwestern South America. Fourteen species of octodontid are recognised, arranged in seven genera. The best known species is the common degu, Octodon degus.

Octodontids are medium-sized rodents, ranging from 12 to 20 centimetres (4.7 to 7.9 inches) in body length. They have long, silky fur, which is typically brownish in color and often paler on the underside. The name 'octodont' derives from the wear pattern of their teeth, which resembles a figure 8. Most are nocturnal, social, burrowing animals, though the degu is largely diurnal. They are herbivorous, eating tubers, bulbs, and cactuses.

Some authors have suggested that the octodontids should be reclassified in the order Lagomorpha, but this has not been supported by further analyses. Older literature includes the tuco-tucos in the family, as the subfamily Ctenomyinae, but these animals are normally now treated as a separate family, Ctenomyidae. There is some evidence that evolution within the family may have resulted from polyploidy. The red viscacha rat, Tympanoctomys barrerae, has been proposed to be a tetraploid, with 102 chromosomes. However, subsequent studies have shown that the increased genome size is due to expansions of repetitive DNA elements.

Members of the genus Aconaemys are referred to as rock rats, and members of genera Octodon and Octodontomys are called degus, though the name degu on its own historically implied Octodon degu. The single member of Spalacopus, S. cyanus, is called the coruro. Members of the other genera are called 'viscacha rats'.

== List of species ==
Genus Aconaemys Ameghino, 1891 (Andean rock rats).

- Species Aconaemys fuscus (Waterhouse, 1842) (Chilean rock rat). Andes of Chile and Argentina.
- Species Aconaemys porteri Thomas, 1917. (Porter's rock rat) Andes of Chile and Argentina.
- Species Aconaemys sagei (Pearson, 1984) (Sage's rock rat). Andes of Chile and Argentina.

Genus Spalacopus (Wagler, 1832).

- Species Spalacopus cyanus Molina, 1782. (Coruro). Central Chile.

Genus Octodon Bennett, 1832 (typical degus).

- Species Octodon bridgesii Waterhouse, 1844 (Bridges's degu). Western Chile
- Species Octodon degus (Molina, 1782) (Common degu). Western Chile.
- Species Octodon lunatus Osgood, 1943 (Moon-toothed degu). Western Chile.
- Species Octodon pacificus Hutterer, 1994 (Isla Mocha degu). Isla Mocha, off western Chile.
- Species Octodon ricardojeda D'Elía, Teta, Verzi, Cadenilla, & Patton, 2020 (Ricardo Ojeda's degu). Andes of Chile and Argentina.

Genus Octodontomys Palmer, 1903.

- Species Octodontomys gliroides Gervais & D'Orbigny, 1844. (Mountain degu) Andes of northwestern Argentina, extreme northeastern Chile and western Bolivia.

Genus Octomys Thomas, 1920.

- Species Octomys mimax Thomas, 1920 (Mountain viscacha rat). Andes of Argentina.

Genus Pipanacoctomys Mares et al., 2000.

- Species Pipanacoctomys aureus Mares et al., 2000 (Golden viscacha rat). Catamarca Prov., Argentina.

Genus Tympanoctomys Yepes, 1942.

- Species Tympanoctomys barrerae (Lawrence, 1941) (Plains viscacha rat or Red viscacha rat). Scattered localities in western Argentina.
- Species Tympanoctomys loschalchalerosorum (Mares, Braun, Barquez & Diaz, 2000) (Chalchalero viscacha rat). Salinas Grandes, Argentina.
- Species Tympanoctomys kirchnerorum (Teta, Pardiñas, Sauthier & Gallardo, 2014) (Kirchner's viscacha rat). western Argentina.
- Species †Tympanoctomys cordubensis
