= Porter's rock rat =

Conservation status
- Data Deficient (IUCN 3.1)

Scientific classification
- Kingdom: Animalia
- Phylum: Chordata
- Class: Mammalia
- Infraclass: Placentalia
- Order: Rodentia
- Family: Octodontidae
- Genus: Aconaemys
- Species: A. porteri

Binomial name
- Aconaemys porteri Thomas, 1917
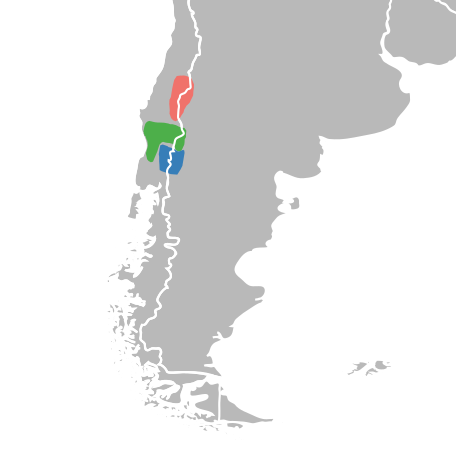
- Aconaemys distribution A. porteri in blue

Species of rodent

Porter's rock rat (Aconaemys porteri) is a species of rodent in the family Octodontidae. It is found in southern Argentina and Chile at altitudes between 900 and 2,000 meters above sea level.
