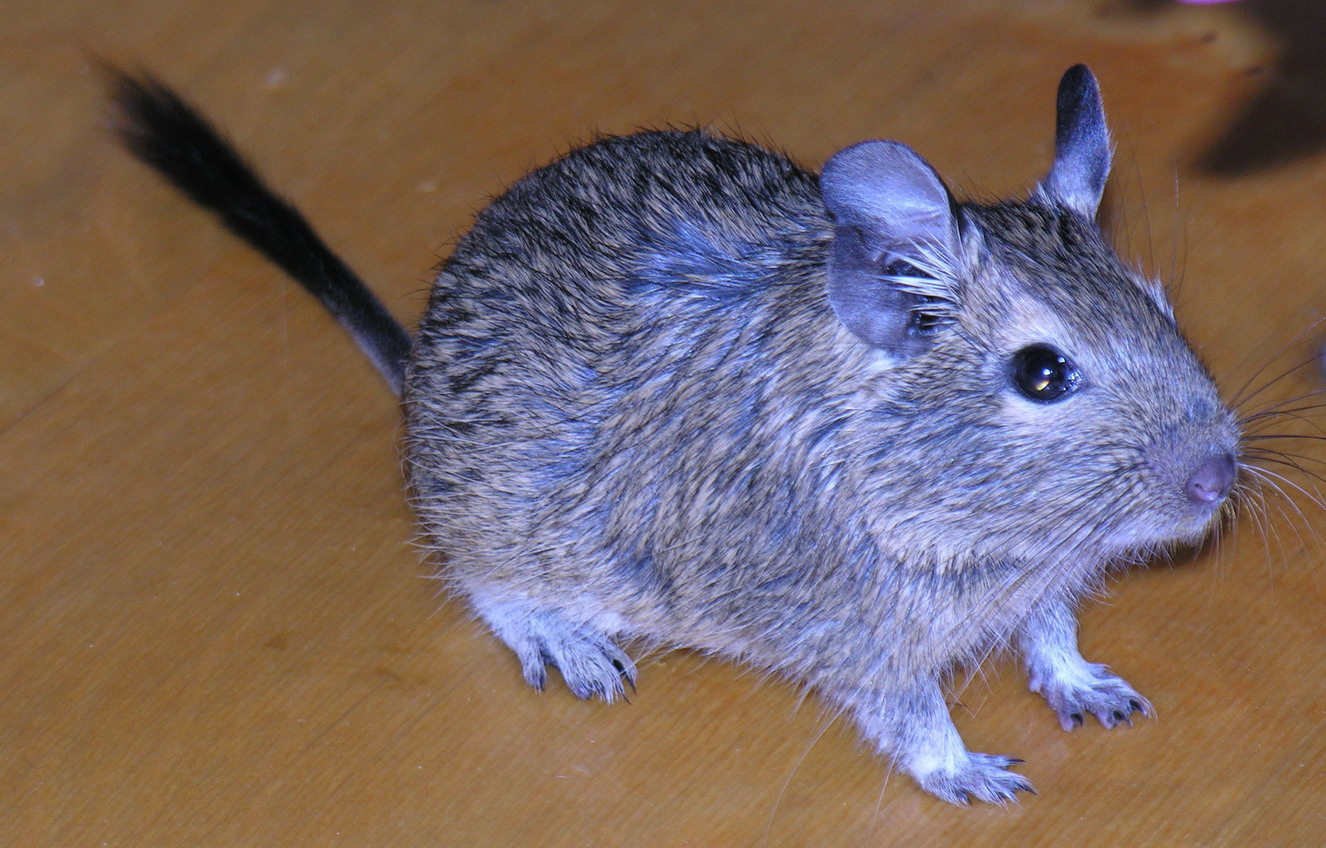
- Common degu, Octodon degus

Scientific classification
- Kingdom: Animalia
- Phylum: Chordata
- Class: Mammalia
- Order: Rodentia
- Family: Octodontidae
- Genus: Octodon; Bennett, 1823

Type species
- Octodon cumingii Bennett, 1832 (= Sciurus degus Molina, 1782)

Species
- Octodon bridgesi Octodon degus Octodon lunatus Octodon pacificus Octodon ricardojeda
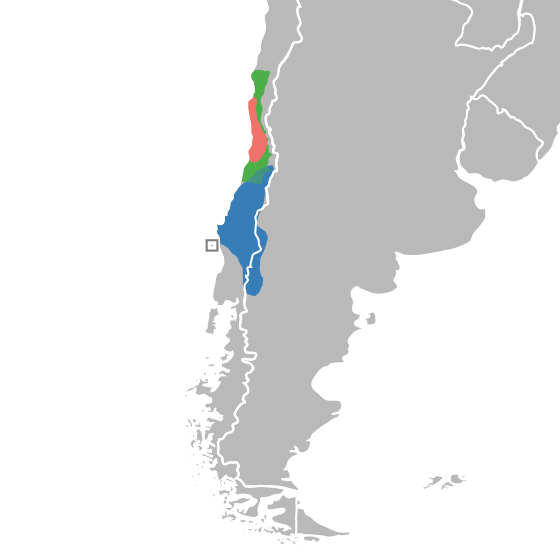
- Octodon distribution O. lunatus in red, O. degus in green, O. bridgesii in blue, O. pacificus in purple (in box)

= Octodon =

Genus of rodents

Octodon (from Ancient Greek ὀκτώ [oktṓ], meaning 'eight', and ὀδούς [odoús], meaning 'tooth') is a genus of octodontid rodents native to South America, in particular in the Chilean Andes. The best-known member is the common degu, O. degus, which is kept as a pet in various countries. Two of the four species of degus are nocturnal.

== Classification ==
This genus was first described in 1832 by the British zoologist Edward Turner Bennett.

== Taxonomy ==
The genus name Octodon comes from Ancient Greek ὀκτώ (oktṓ), meaning "eight", and ὀδούς (odoús), meaning "tooth", referring to how their teeth, molars and premolars are shaped like the number 8.

The full list of species is:

- O. bridgesii, Bridges's degu, found in central Chile
- O. degus, the common degu or degu, found in central Chile
- O. lunatus, the moon-toothed degu, found in central Chile
- O. pacificus, the Pacific degu or Mocha Island degu, found exclusively on Mocha Island, Chile
- O. ricardojeda, Ricardo Ojeda's degu, found in western Argentina and Chile

== Distribution ==
In the wild, all species of degus live in the Andes, mainly in the mountains of Chile, to which most of them are endemic, aside from a few populations of O. ricardojeda in the neighboring province of Neuquén, Argentina. They are found between 0 and 1,800 m in altitude.

== Description ==
They are medium-sized octodontids. Their total body length varies between 200 and 390 millimeters (7.9 and 15.4 in) with a tail which measures between 81 and 170 millimeters (3.2 and 6.7 in) and represents 70 to 80% of the head + body length. The coat color is grayish, or dull with orange highlights, and turns creamy yellow on the belly. The tail is carried slightly curved and is the same color as the body, and ends with a tuft of black hairs, with the extent of black depending on the species. The ears are quite large and protrude widely from the head, except in O. pacificus. The lower limbs are suitable for jumping, with pads on the soles of the paws that prevent slipping. The forelegs have four clawed fingers, along with a poorly developed fifth finger with a nail. The glans of the penis is characterized by a variable number of spikes, five or more in number, on each side.

== Lifestyle ==
They are both nocturnal and diurnal. Degus are primarily folivorous herbivores. Their diet varies according to annual vegetation cycles. The consumption of their own droppings (coprophagia) is practiced during times of scarcity. This provides them with a nutritional supplement thanks to the microbial fermentation that takes place in the cecum and optimizes the digestion of fibrous foods.

These social animals dig a burrow made of a series of tunnels where they live in small to large groups composed of both males and females.

== Conservation status ==
O. bridgesii (assessed as conspecific with O. ricardojeda) is considered vulnerable by the IUCN Red List, while O. pacificus is considered critically endangered. The other two species are considered of least concern.
