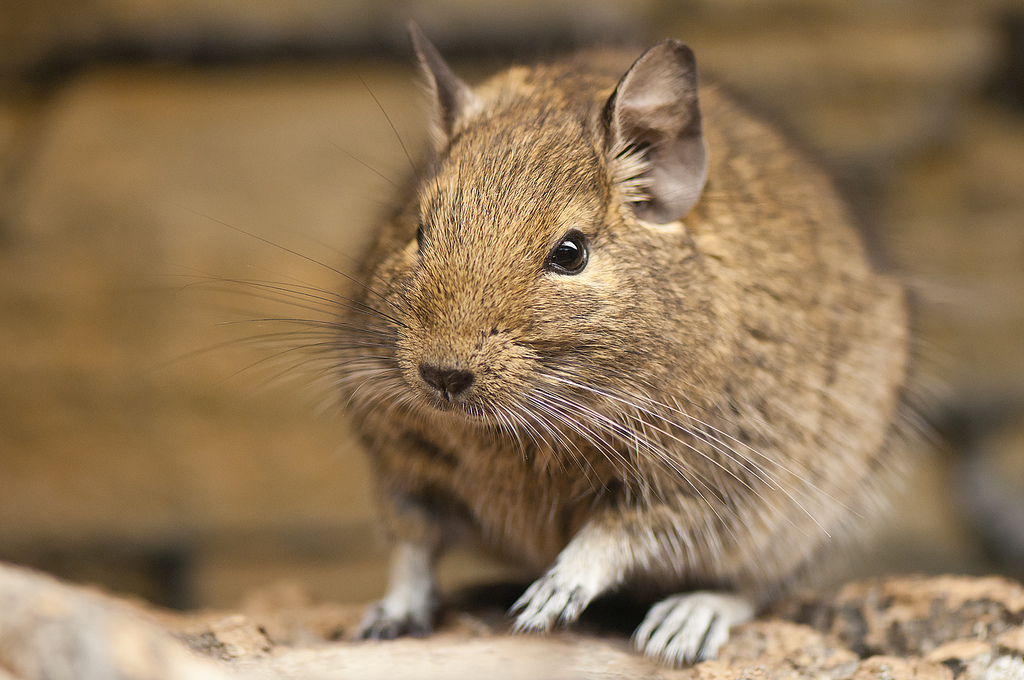
- At Heidelberg Zoo, Germany

Conservation status
- Least Concern (IUCN 3.1)

Scientific classification
- Kingdom: Animalia
- Phylum: Chordata
- Class: Mammalia
- Order: Rodentia
- Family: Octodontidae
- Genus: Octodon
- Species: O. degus

Binomial name
- Octodon degus (Molina, 1782)
- Range of O. degus

Synonyms
- Sciurus degus Molina, 1782; Octodon degus: Waterhouse, 1848

= Common degu =

Species of rodent

The common degu (Octodon degus; /ˈdeɪɡuː/), or, historically, the degu, is a small hystricomorpha rodent endemic to the Chilean matorral ecoregion of central Chile. The name degu on its own indicates either the entire genus Octodon or, more commonly, just the common degu. Common degus belong to the parvorder Caviomorpha of the infraorder Hystricognathi, along with the chinchilla and guinea pig. The word degu comes from the Mapuche word dewü, meaning 'mouse' or 'rat'.

Although found in a relatively small natural habitat when compared to other species of rodents, degus are prolific and thus classified as a least-concern species by IUCN. The animal may be kept as a domestic pet, though there are prohibitions on their ownership in some territories. As a pet, the degu is larger than a golden hamster but smaller than a fancy rat.

== Description ==
The common degu is a small animal with a body length of 25.0 to 31.0 cm (9.8–12.2 in) and a weight of 170 to 400 g (6.0 to 14.1 oz). It has yellow-brown fur above and creamy-yellow below, with yellow around the eyes and a paler band around the neck. It has a long, thin tail with a tufted, black tip, dark sparsely furred ears, and pale grey toes. Its fifth toe is small with a nail, rather than a claw, on the fore feet. Its hind feet are bristled. Its cheek teeth are shaped like figures-of-eight, hence the degu's genus name Octodon.

== Social behavior ==
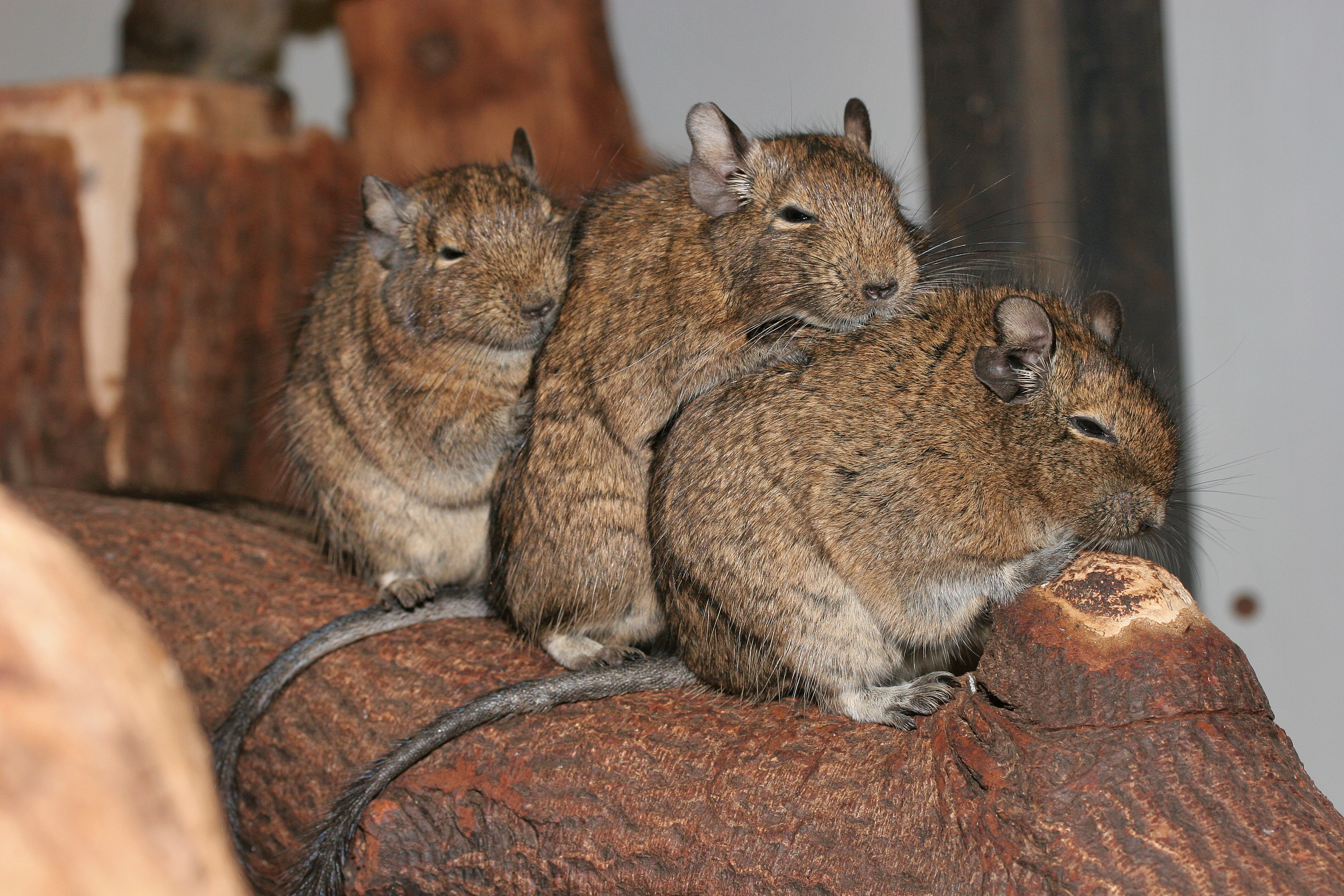
Degus nestling to keep warm at Artis Zoo in the Netherlands

Common degus are highly social. They live in burrows, and, by digging communally, they are able to construct larger and more elaborate burrows than any one could dig on its own. Degus digging together coordinate their activities, forming digging chains. Females living in the same group have been shown to spontaneously nest communally; they nurse one another's young. They spend a large amount of time on the surface, where they forage for food. When foraging, their ability to detect predators is increased in larger groups, and each animal needs to spend less time being vigilant.

Common degus exhibit a wide array of communication techniques. They have an elaborate vocal repertoire comprising up to 15 different sounds, and the young need to be able to hear their mother's calls if the emotional systems in their brains are to develop properly. They use their urine to scent mark, and experiments have shown that they react to one another's marks, although in males the hormone testosterone may suppress their sense of smell somewhat.

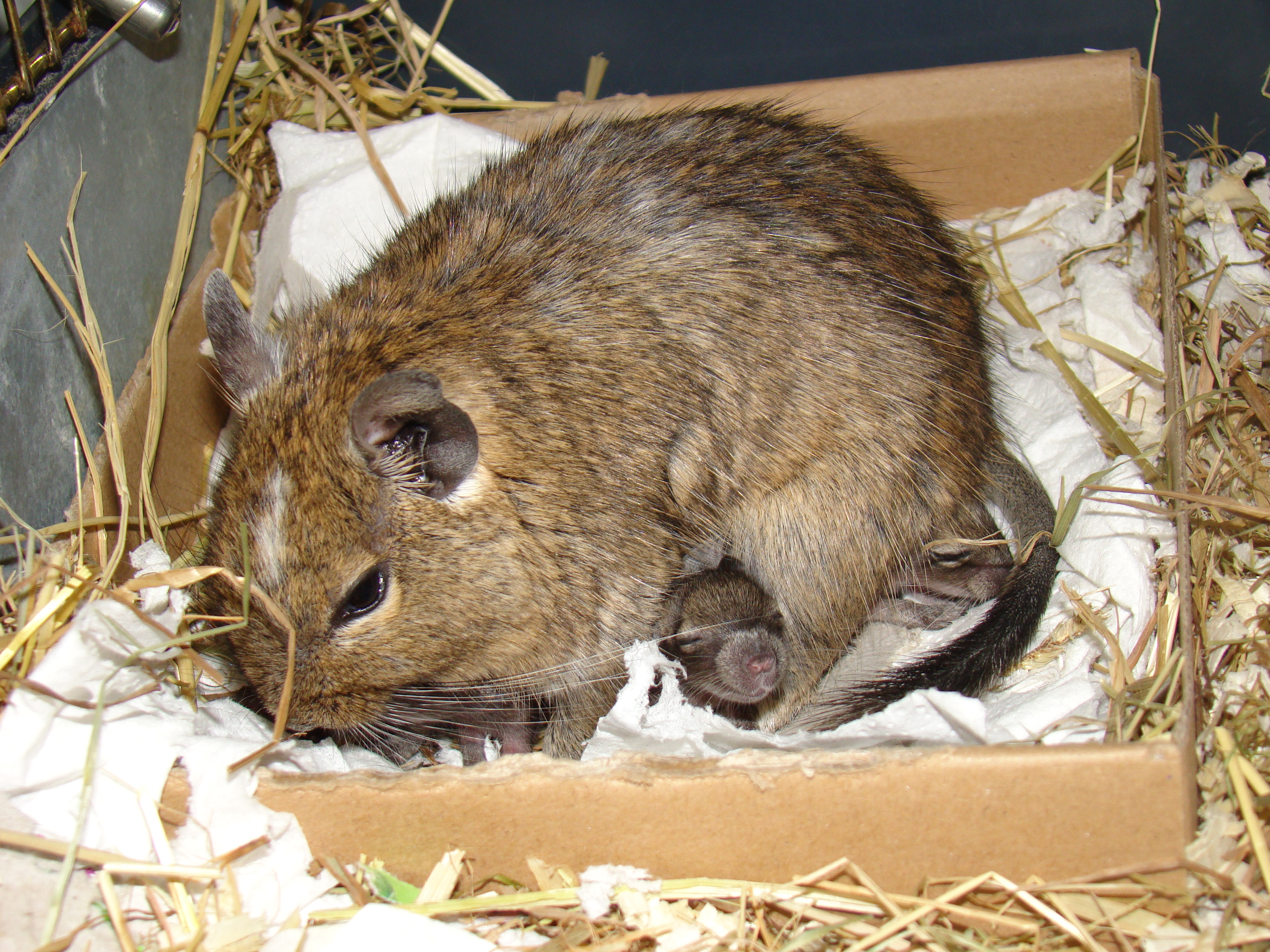
Male degu keeping newborn pups warm

Common degus are seasonal breeders. The breeding season for wild degus begins in the Chilean autumn when day and night are roughly equal, with pups born in early to mid-spring. Female degus are pregnant for approximately ninety days, which is a relatively long gestation period compared to other non-caviomorph rodents. Female pregnant weight varies over the course of gestation and according to litter size; litters contain an average of six pups, but size can range from one or two up to twelve young. Common degu pups are born relatively precocial, fully furred and with eyes open, and their hearing and sight are both functional at birth. Unlike most other rodents, male common degus also take part in protecting and raising their pups until they are old enough to leave the family.

Unlike some other octodontids, common degus are diurnal (active during the day), and they have good vision. Their retinas include rod cells and two types of cone cells, corresponding to peak sensitivity in the green and ultraviolet regions of the spectrum. Behavioral experiments have shown that degus are able to discriminate ultraviolet light (UV) from the wavelengths visible to humans. It is likely that this ultraviolet sensitivity has a social function, since both their ventral (stomach) fur and their urine are highly UV reflective.

== Diet ==
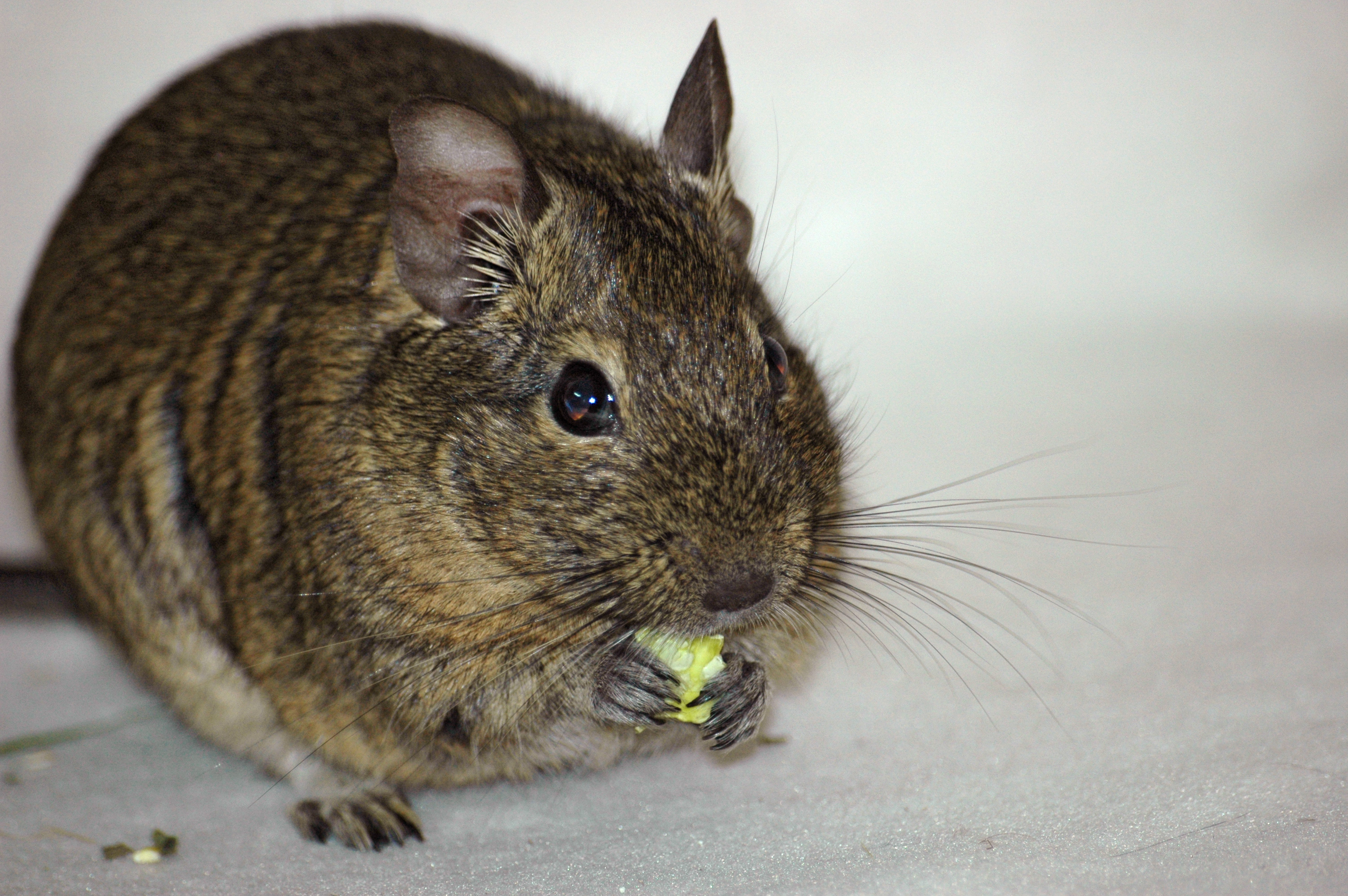
Degus use their forepaws to hold food while eating.

Common degus are strictly herbivorous, in the wild feeding on grasses and browsing the leaves of shrubs, though they will also take seeds. Throughout much of the year forage is dried and so common degus are specially adapted to a very high fibre intake, and this varies between food types and environmental conditions. Like some other herbivores such as rabbits, they perform coprophagy (faecal reingestion) so as to extract more nutrition from their diet. This also serves to maintain healthy gut function during times when food is scarce. Although they are active by day, in high summer they do not leave their burrows in the middle of the day and instead emerge to forage in the mornings and evenings.

Common degus have an intolerance of dietary sugar. They have been found to have a divergent insulin structure (one of the hormones that regulate blood glucose level) and so are highly susceptible to developing diabetes mellitus when fed regularly on a diet containing free sugars. This is thought to be due to evolutionary pressure arising from the lack of availability of free sugars in the degu's natural environment. Because of this, the ingredients of non-degu-specific hard feed formulations given to captive common degus should be checked for sugar-laden ingredients, such as molasses.

== Research subjects ==
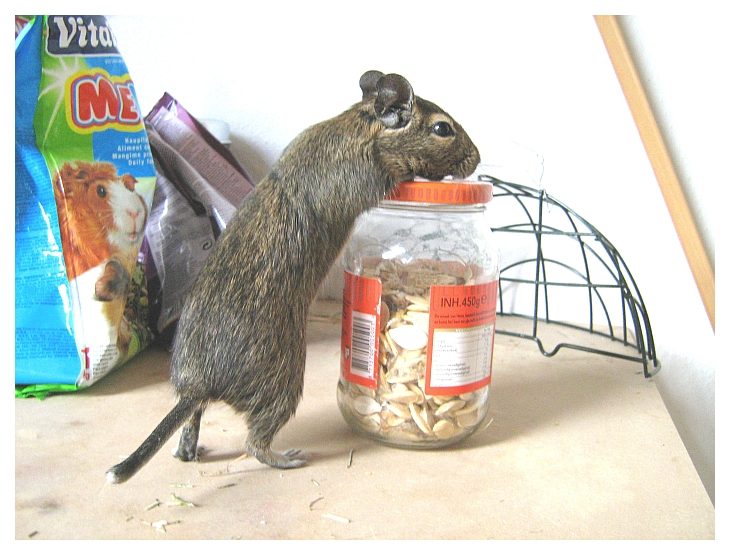
Common degus are extremely intelligent and have a good ability to solve problems. This individual has a much shorter tail than normal.

Common degus are research subjects due to their relationship with sugar and diabetes, but are also studied for a variety of other reasons. They have been used for research into tool use in animals with good eye-and-paw coordination, in which they spontaneously learned to use a tiny rake to retrieve out-of-reach seeds. Common degus have also been found to spontaneously stack objects in order of decreasing size. In both cases, it is the first time these behaviours have been recorded in animals other than apes and birds.

Another area of common degu research is circadian rhythm function, i.e., the ability of the brain to tell what time of day it is. Degus have the ability to show both diurnal and nocturnal rhythms if the environment permits. Common degus can take cues that do not relate to day length, such as temperature, melatonin levels and scents from other degus to adjust their rhythms.

Common degus are also used in development and aging studies. Separation anxiety caused by separating degu pups from their mother from an early age for periods of half an hour or more can cause developmental and behavioural changes in later life, similar to ADHD in humans. In elderly common degus, neural markers have been discovered which are similar to those in humans with Alzheimer's disease, which is the first time this has been seen in a wild-type rodent.

== As pets ==
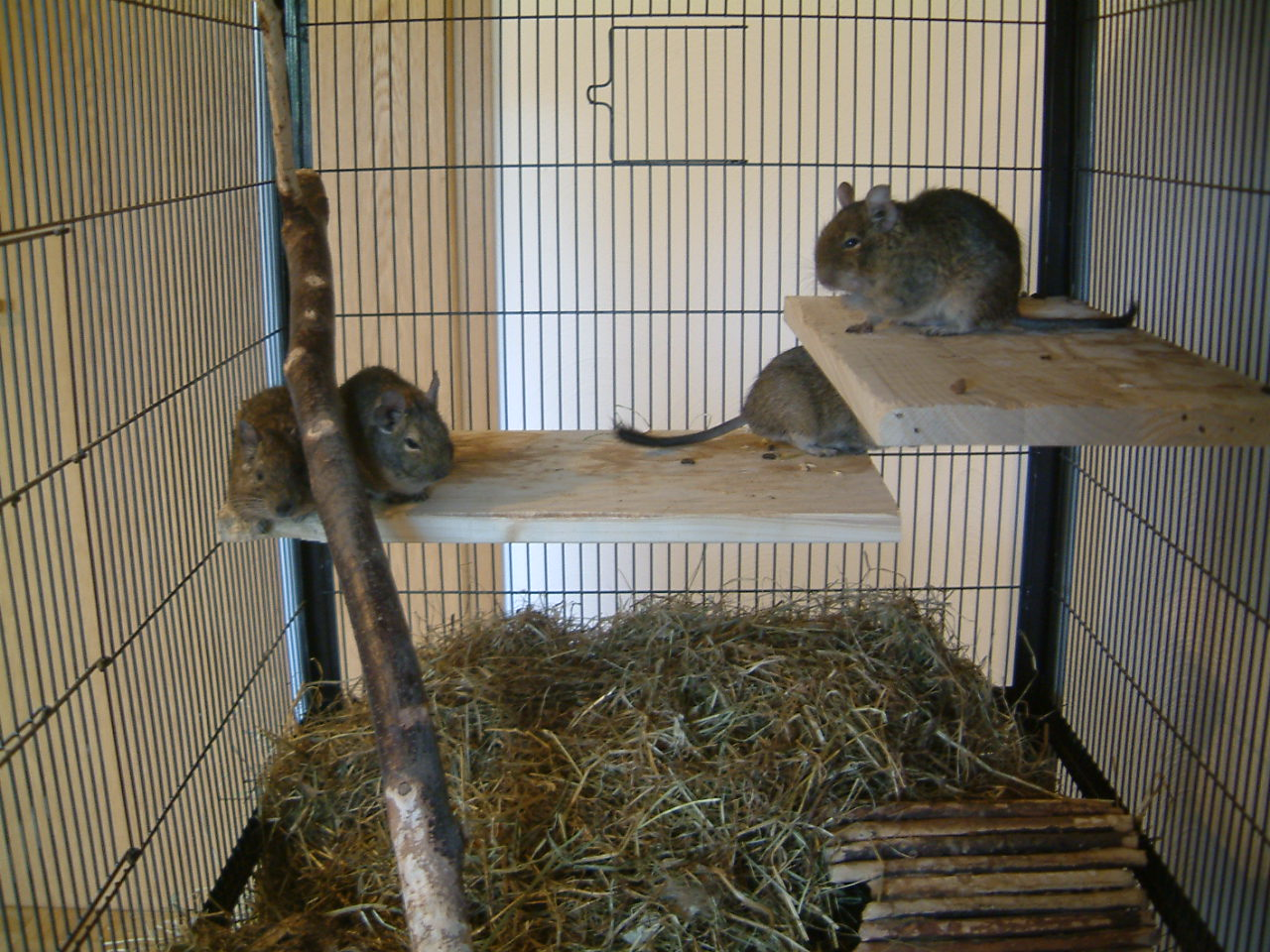
Captive common degus need plenty of space to exhibit a full range of normal behaviours.

A caged degu, 2023

After initial interest into common degus as research subjects, they have become popular as pets. Their advantages over traditional small pets are their diurnal habits, bubbly personalities, the haired tail (as compared to rats and mice), and their longer lifespan: They are reported to live up to 13 years under ideal circumstances. However, an inbred gene pool among isolated pet-breeders, or breeding from animals with a troublesome genetic background, often significantly reduces pet degus' lifespans. The lifespan of captive common degus averages 5–6 years.

One disadvantage of the common degu as a pet is their predisposition to chewing, due to their continually growing incisor and molar teeth. For this reason, common degus cannot be housed in plastic-bottomed cages typically found in pet stores. Lining the floors of a degu enclosure with grass mats or a soft fabric prevents infections called "bumblefoot".

As with some other small animals kept as pets, untamed common degus can be prone to biting, but their intelligence makes them easy to tame: Regular non-capture (predatory) handling and food offerings help with this transition. The common degu's tail skin and tuft is easily "shed" (pulled off). In the wild this helps degus elude capture by predators, but it is painful for the degu, and the tail end will not grow back. Similarly, pulling on it or picking up a degu by the tail is not recommended. When its tail is shed, the degu will normally chew off the damaged portion; which can reduce the chance of infection.

Common degus often "groom" their human owners with a gentle nibbling action, and will bond with people that spend time with them. Common degus need regular sand baths, like how Chinchillas need dust baths, to keep their coats healthy and free from grease. They should have access to these baths regularly, preferably two or three times a week for half an hour at a time. However, daily sand bathing can make their coats soiled.

=== Prohibitions ===
Some jurisdictions consider common degus as a potential invasive species and forbid owning them as a pet.

In the United States, they are illegal to own in California, Utah, Georgia, Connecticut, and Alaska.

== Gallery ==
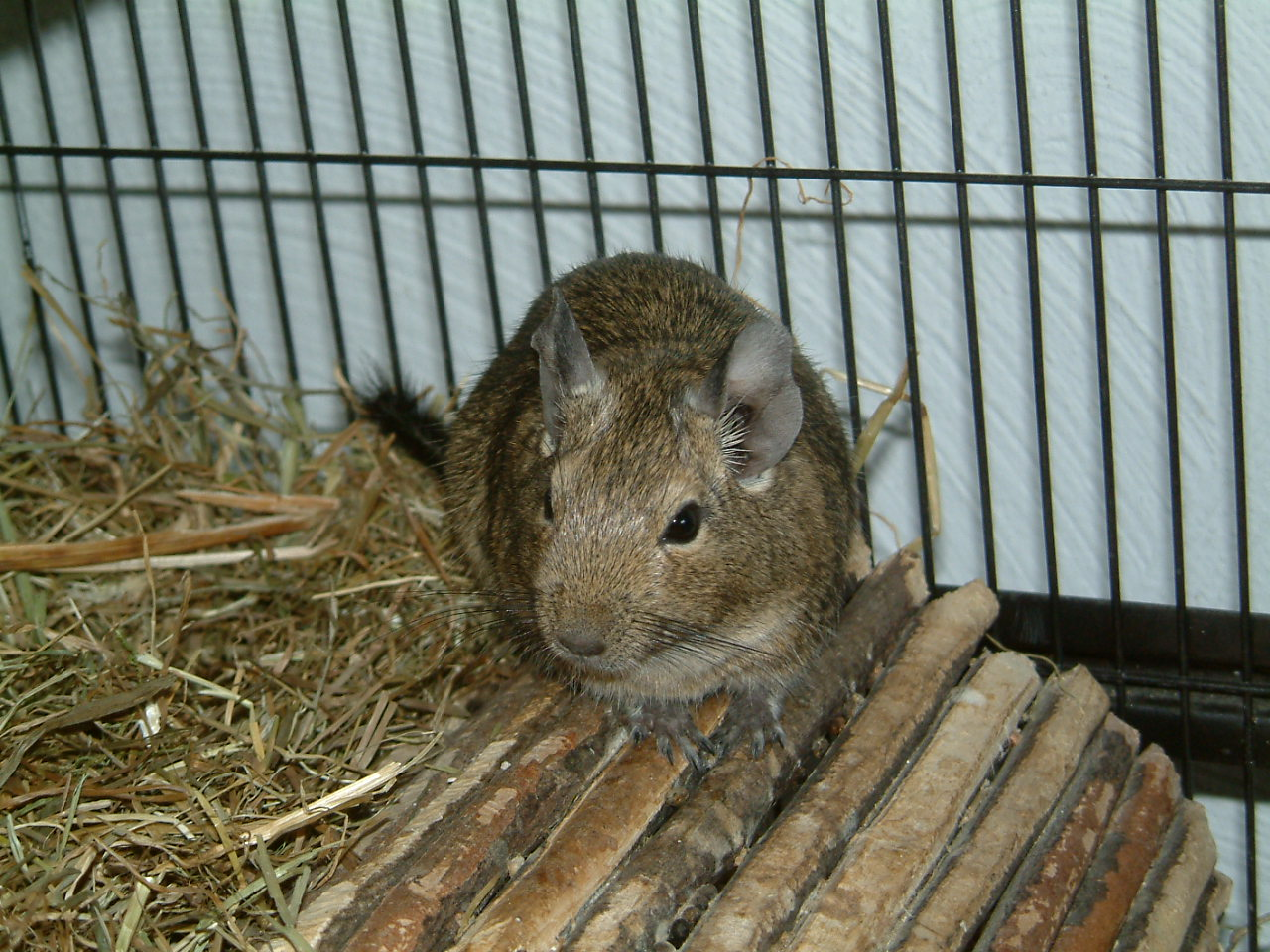
Common degu in captivity

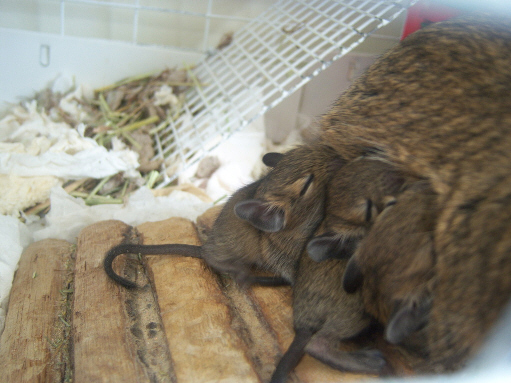
Baby common degus nursing

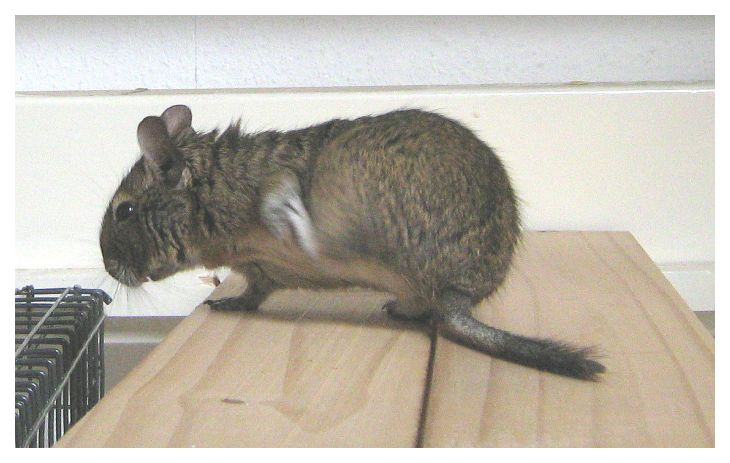
Common degu scratching

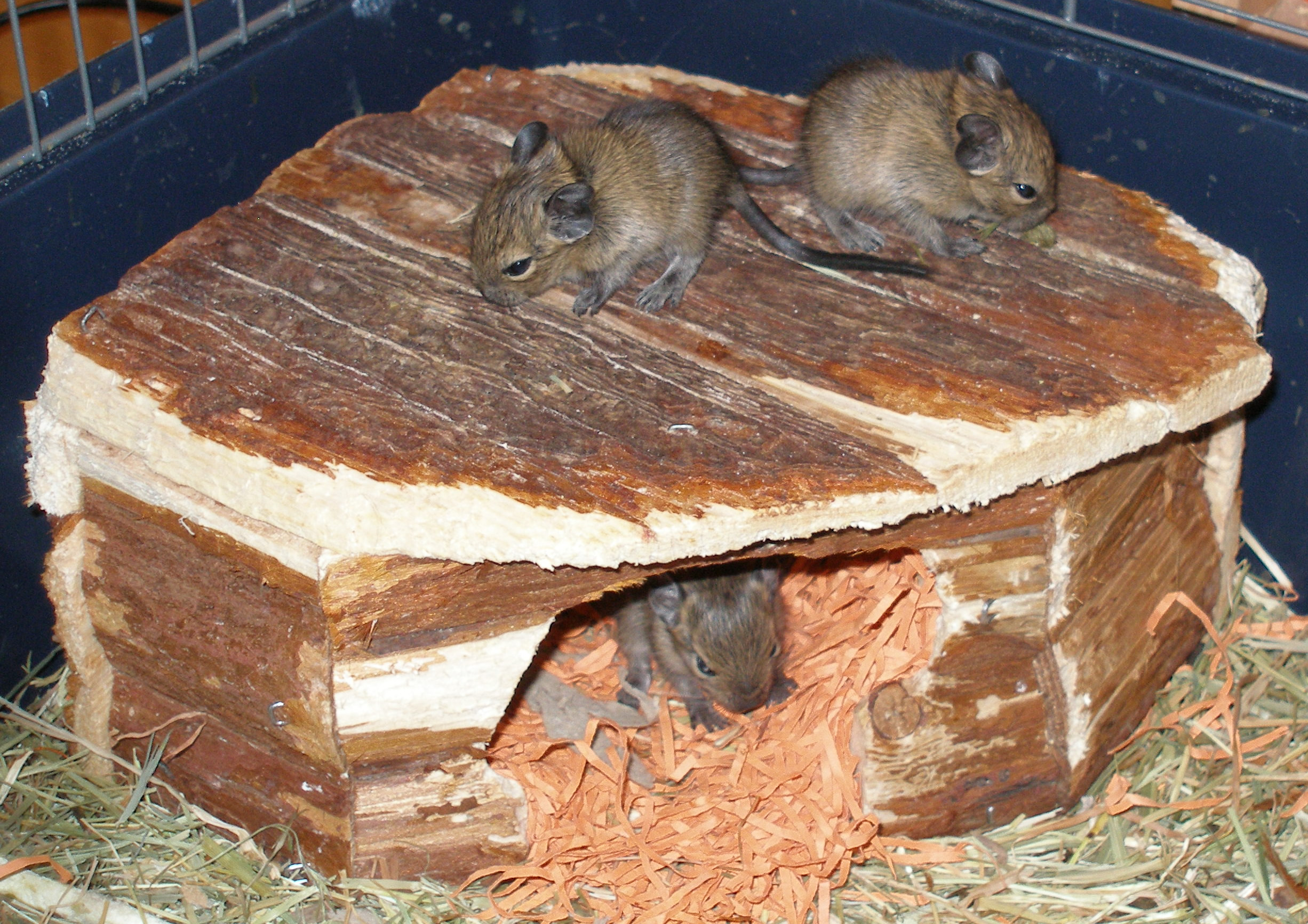
Three common degu pups, eight days old

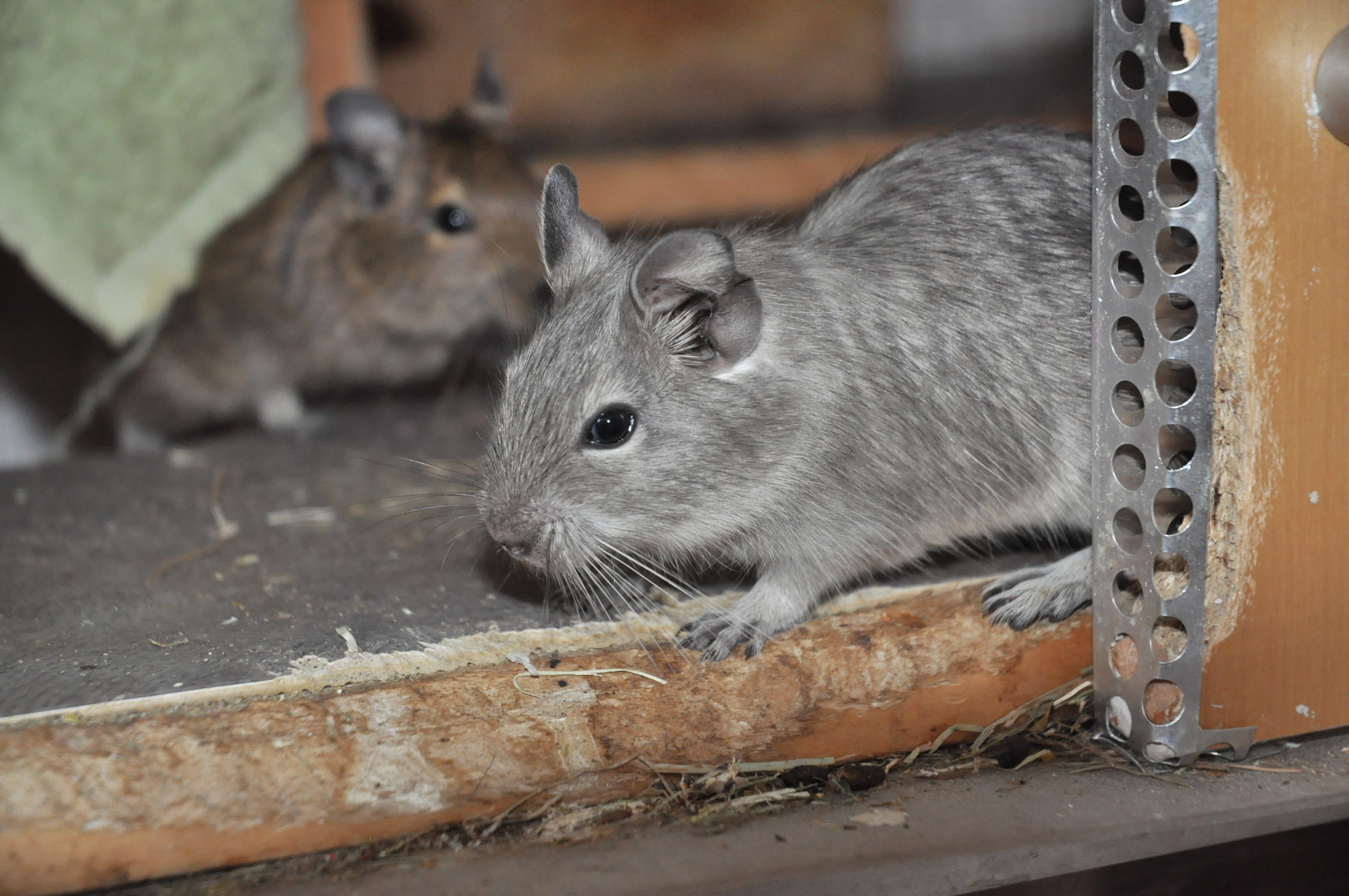
Degu with blue coat, a common colour variation

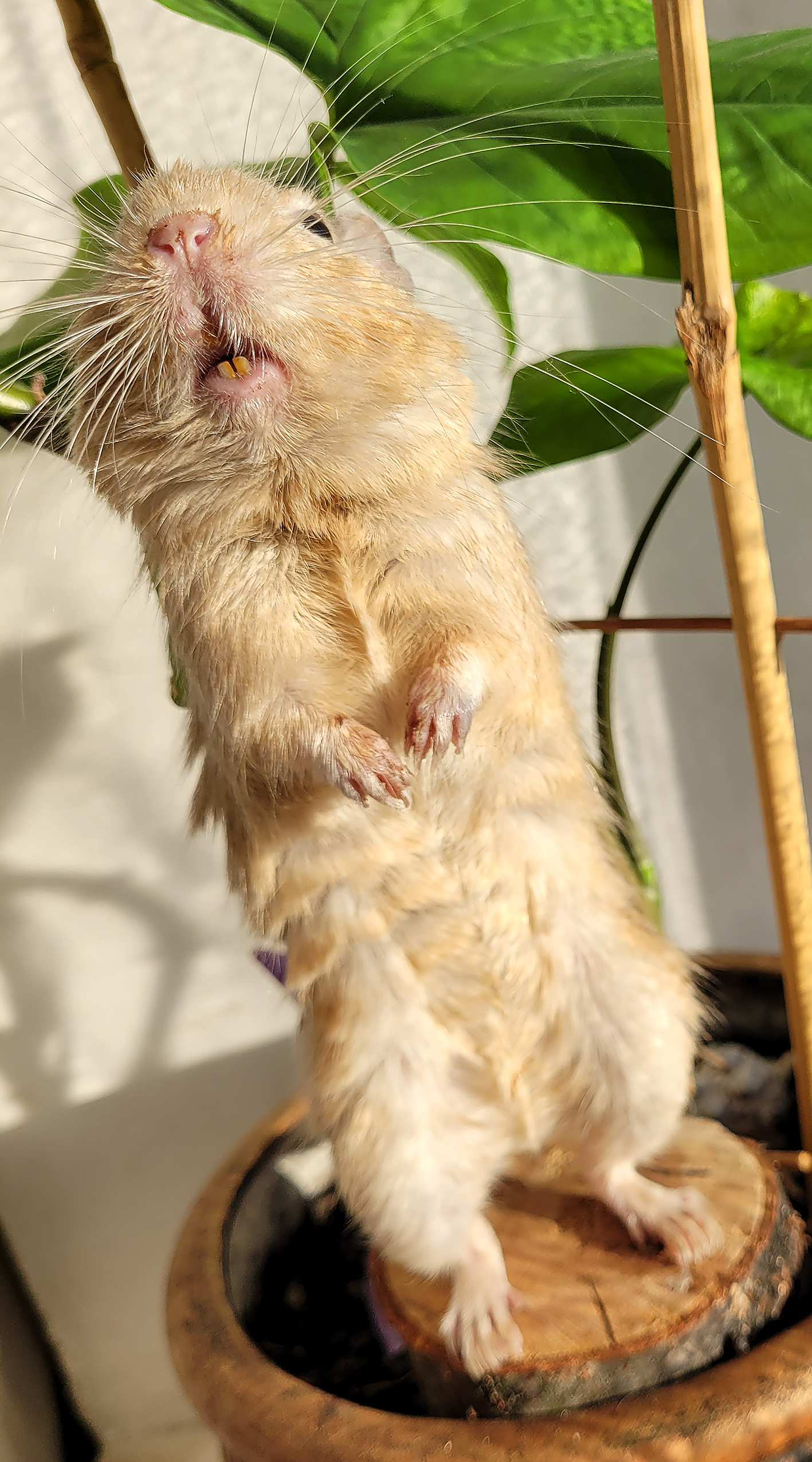
Pet degu with significant coat variations

== See also ==
- Communal burrow
