= Pleurodema cordobae =

Conservation status
- Least Concern (IUCN 3.1)

Scientific classification
- Kingdom: Animalia
- Phylum: Chordata
- Class: Amphibia
- Order: Anura
- Family: Leptodactylidae
- Genus: Pleurodema
- Species: P. cordobae

Binomial name
- Pleurodema cordobae Valetti, Salas, and Martino, 2009

Species of amphibian

Pleurodema cordobae is a species of frog in the family Leptodactylidae. It is endemic to the Sierras de Córdoba of Argentina. This endemic species also resides with the highly similar species, Pleurodema kriegi. P. cordobae exhibits particular characteristics that differentiate it from other frogs in the Pleurodema genus, including the fact that the species is octoploid, as compared to the P. kriegi and Pleurodema bibroni, which are tetraploid. P. cordobae inhabits temporary and semi-permanent ponds. As this species is only found in isolated locations such as the Sierra Grande, little is known about its very limited population.

== Distribution ==
Pleurodema cordobae co-inhabits the Sierras de Córdoba with another endemic species, Pleurodema kriegi. The current morphology and previous tectonic activities of the area have produced several endemic plant and animal species due to allopatric speciation. P. cordobae and P. kriegi are restricted between the parallels of latitude 31º26'S and 32°36´S which is from the Pampa de Achala and Sierra de Comechingones in the Córdoba province to the south of the Sierras de Córdoba. P. cordobae inhabits Estancia Los Tabaquillos and two other ponds located 5 kilometers away from it. Two ponds in Los Linderos, Sierra de Comechingones had a total of 13 individuals of the species. Two ponds in Puesto Pereyra, Pampa de Achala had 11 individuals, and in Mal Paso, Pampa de Achala, 16 P. cordobae individuals were located. The two semi-permanent ponds of Estancia Los Tabaquillos do not have the cryptic P. kriegi species.

== Habitat and ecology ==
Typical habitat is represented by temporary and semi-permanent ponds, at the high grassland, with vegetation at the edges and a depth of 20 to 30 cm. The males of this species were found to be acoustically active from December to March (Austral summer) from 21.00 hrs to 4.00 hrs (sunset time: 21.00 – 21.30 hrs). This species was observed in syntopy with Rhinella achalensis, Rhinella arenarum, Odontophrynus achalensis, and Hypsiboas cordobae. In 2010, the egg masses were observed to be adhered to vegetation, which was most abundant along the edge of the ponds. Thus, the greatest density of nests in the smaller pond could be due to the higher edge/area rate.

== Morphology ==
Sketch of an adult P. cordobae individual.

=== Adults ===
Pleurodema cordobae adults are relatively small in size and possess short snouts. The dorsal body surface is yellow in color and mottled with green and the ventral body surface is whitish and mildly dotted with dark spots. The palms and soles of the feed are darkened, and there are 2 non-darkened palmar tubercles and 2 metatarsal tubercles. The fingers and toes are free. The vocal sacs of P. cordobae are single, median, and subgular with a dark coloration. P. cordobae possess a round tympanic annulus that is almost entirely concealed, and the length of the tympanum is roughly half the length of the eye diameter. There are no vomerine teeth and a prominent commissural gland. The true eyes have golden irises with black reticulations, while the lumbar glands are yellow with a black central ocellus. This resemblance to the true eyes is the reason behind the common name "four-eyed frogs" for the Pleurodema genus. The lumbar glands are 1 ½ eye length in diameter, which markedly differentiates the species from Pleurodema tucumanum, Pleurodema nebulosum, Pleurodema guayapae, Pleurodema marmoratum, and Pleurodema diplolister. There is also a bright red-orange patch found on the frog's groin surrounding the lumbar glands.

Externally, the morphology of P. cordobae is heavily similar to P. kriegi, and it is impossible to distinguish the two species using only external morphology. Internally, P. cordobae erythrocytes are significantly larger in diameter (317 ± 13 μm^{2}) than P. kriegi erythrocytes (232 ± 21 μm^{2}). Genetic analyses can also be used to distinguish the two species, as P. cordobae is octoploid and P. kriegi is not.

=== Tadpoles ===
Dorsal, ventral, & lateral view sketches of a P. cordobae tadpole.

Pleurodema cordobae tadpoles typically have total lengths of 39 ± 3.6 mm. The body length of the tadpole is usually 40% of the total length. Tadpoles have light brown cephalic regions and snouts, with increased pigmentation around the nares and less pigmentation around the eyes, and a bright copper ventral area. The abdominal region is much darker and has a greenish shine. The oral disc of the tadpoles is anteroventral and laterally emarginated with either a single alternated or double row of marginal papillae. There are simple, small, sub-conical papillae but no sub-marginal papillae. The free margin of the tadpole's upper jaw is wide and arch-like in shape, whereas the lower jaw sheath is V-shaped. The jaw sheaths are also keratinized. The spiracle tube of the P. cordobae tadpole is single, short, sinistral, lateral, and posterodorsally directed.

== Reproduction ==
Pleurodema cordobae tend to be similar in reproductive habits to P. kriegi and P. bibroni species, in that the males use a call to mate with the females. One difference that P. cordobae exhibits is their pulse rate. P. cordobae have a higher pulse rate than the other species, and this plays a role in the mating of each species. P. cordobae are also the only species to be octoploid—having eight sets of chromosomes in a single cell—whereas the other two species above are tetraploid. P. cordobae are also known to have a certain sexual range for when they produce their mating call. The males call out to mates from December to March. P. cordobae also call their mated whilst floating on the edge of a pond.

== Conservation status ==
P. cordobae is abundant within its small range, albeit only seen during the breeding season. There are no major threats to it. Its range overlaps with Pampa de Achala Provincial Water Reserve and might extend into the Quebrada del Condorito National Park.
