= Argentine Monte =

Ecoregion in Argentina

Argentine Monte (NT0802)
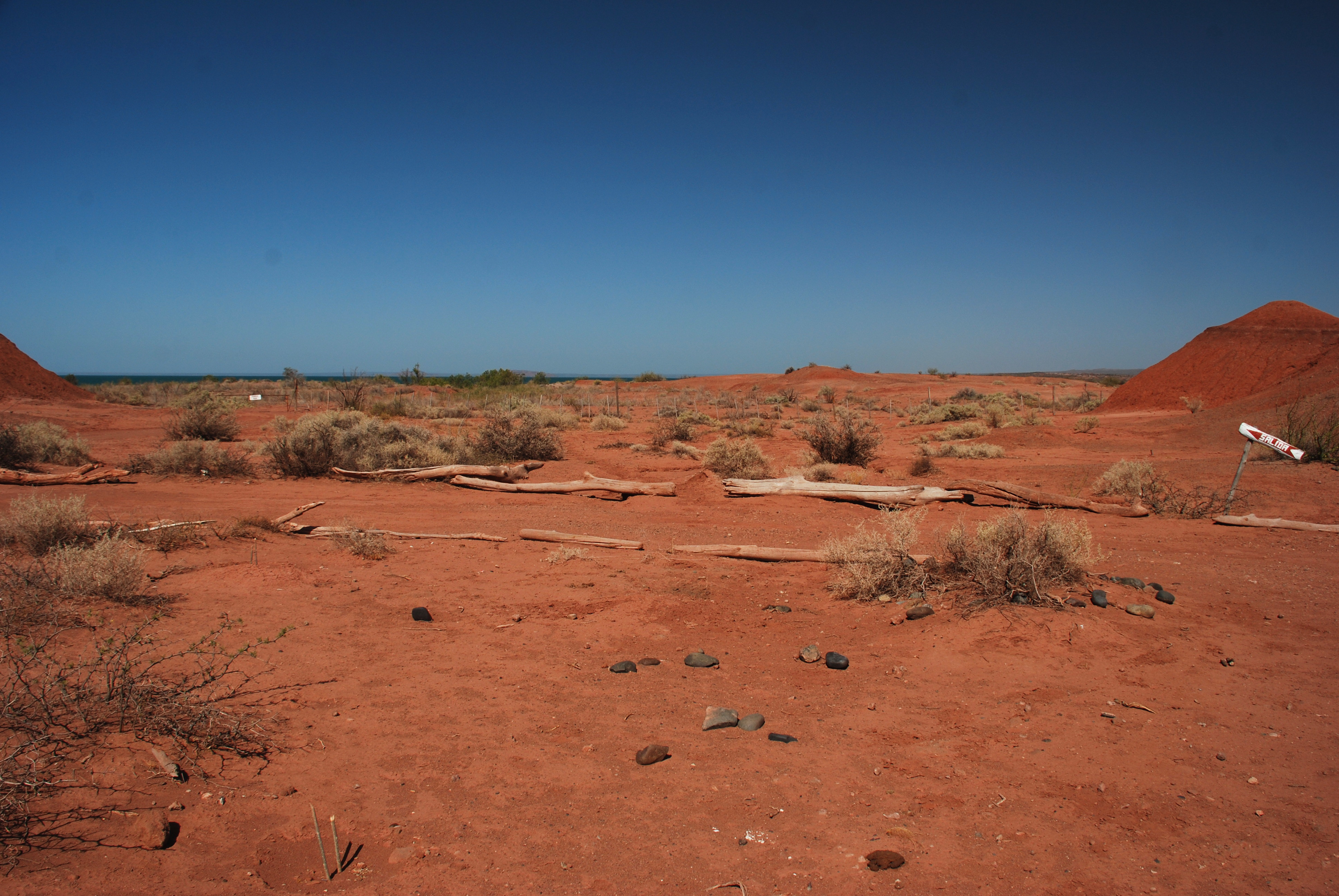
- Desert near Barreales lake, Neuquén Province

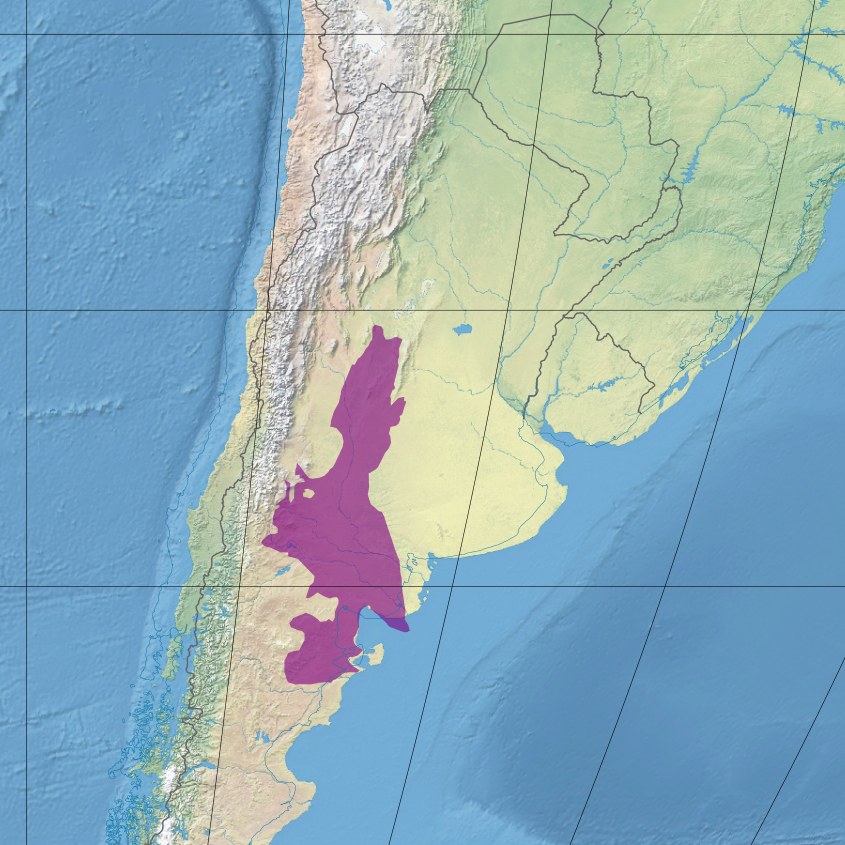
- Ecoregion territory (in purple)

Ecology
- Realm: Neotropical
- Biome: Deserts and xeric shrublands, Temperate grasslands, savannas, and shrublands
- Borders: Argentine Espinal; Dry Chaco; High Monte, Patagonian steppe

Geography
- Area: 354,192 km^{2} (136,754 mi^{2})
- Country: Argentina
- Coordinates: 38.690°S 67.597°W
- Climate type: BSk: arid, steppe, cold arid

Conservation
- Protected: 5.37%

The Argentine Monte (NT0802), or Low Monte, is an ecoregion of dry thorn scrub and grasslands in Argentina. It is one of the driest regions in the country. Human settlements are mainly near water supplies such as rivers or oases. Deforestation and over-grazing around these settlements have caused desertification.

== Location ==
The Argentine Monte is in north-central Argentina, and has an area of 354,192 square kilometres (136,800 mi^{2}). It is to the east of the Andes and extends from Salta Province in the north to Chubut Province in the south. It extends from the eastern foothills of the Andes to the Atlantic Ocean. The ecoregion merges into the Patagonian steppe in the south and southwest. The Dry Chaco lies to the northeast, and the Espinal is to the east.

In the northwest it borders the High Monte. Some consider the High Monte a separate ecoregion, while others consider it a part of the Argentine Monte.

== Physical ==
Elevations range from sea level on the Atlantic coast to 2,800 metres (9,200 ft). The region contains parts of the watersheds of the Rio Negro and Rio Colorado. The Lagunas de Guanacache, Desaguadero y del Bebedero in Mendoza Province form the most important wetland in the ecoregion, designated a Ramsar site. This is a long chain of lagoons and marshes covering 10,000 square kilometres (3,900 sq mi) fed by the Mendoza and San Juan rivers, which drains into the Desaguadero River. The lakes and streams are mostly seasonal or intermittent.

The ecoregion is by far the driest part of Argentina. The Köppen climate classification is "BSk": arid, steppe, cold arid. Annual precipitation is 80 to 250 millimetres (3.1 to 9.8 in). In the north and central regions there is more rain in summer. In the colder south the monthly rainfall is more evenly distributed. At a sample location at coordinates 38.25°S 67.25°W the mean temperature ranges from 6.3 °C (43.3 °F) in July to 23.1 °C (73.6 °F) in January. The yearly average mean temperature is 15 °C (59 °F). Annual precipitation is about 175 millimetres (6.9 in). Monthly precipitation ranges from 5.4 millimetres (0.21 in) in July to 25.7 millimetres (1.01 in) in October.

== Ecology ==
The Argentine Monte is in the Neotropical realm, in the temperate grasslands, savannas, and shrublands biome.

=== Flora ===
Flora are typically thorn scrub and dry grassland, with relatively low plant diversity. There are thin gallery forests along the rivers. There are areas of cactus scrub, xerophilous open woodland, and vegetation adapted to rocky, sandy and salty conditions. In some areas the scrub is very open. The steppe contains resinous evergreen bushes, mainly from the family Zygophyllaceae and the genera Larrea, Bulnesia and Plectocarpa. Other species are Monttea aphylla, Bougainvillea spinosa and Prosopis species.

In the north cacti of the genera Echinopsis and Cereus and bromeliads of the genera Dyckia, Deuterocohnia and Tillandsia are more common. Herbaceous plants appear after rain showers, including Portulaca grandiflora, irises, lilies and grasses. On the river edges or where there is underground water there are gallery forests of Prosopis species. Larrea cuneifolia is found in hot and dry areas, Larrea divaricata along the streams and Larrea nitida in cooler areas and mountain slopes. Other plants found in different conditions include Baccharis salicifolia, Tessaria dodonaefolia, Suaeda divaricata and Allenrolfea vaginata. Several endemic species have evolved in isolation since the Oligocene such as Ramorinoa girolae and Gomphrena colosacana, found in the Sierra de las Quijadas National Park, and Halophytum ameghinoi, a succulent herbaceous plant in the Halophytaceae family.

=== Fauna ===
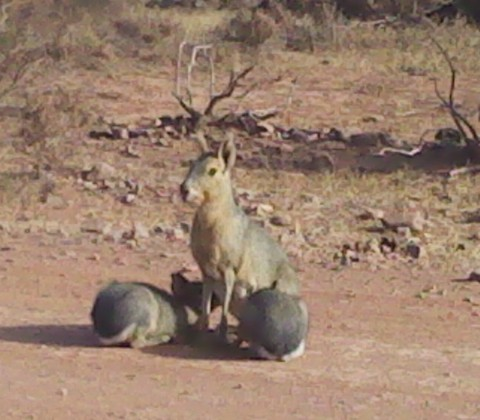
Mara breastfeeding in the Sierra de las Quijadas National Park

Common mammals include screaming hairy armadillo (Chaetophractus vellerosus), pink fairy armadillo (Chlamyphorus truncatus), cougar (Puma concolor), South American gray fox (Lycalopex griseus), Patagonian weasel (Lyncodon patagonicus), guanaco (Lama guanicoe), and southern mountain cavy (Microcavia australis). Vulnerable or endangered mammals include plains viscacha rat (Tympanoctomys barrerae), pink fairy armadillo (Chlamyphorus truncatus), strong tuco-tuco (Ctenomys validus), viscacha rat (Octomys mimax), Roig's pericote (Andalgalomys roigi), delicate salt flat mouse (Salinomys delicatus) and Patagonian mara (Dolichotis patagonum). Endangered mammals include southern river otter (Lontra provocax).

Birds include elegant crested tinamou (Eudromia elegans), cinnamon warbling finch (Poospiza ornata), Darwin's nothura (Nothura darwinii) and burrowing parrot (Cyanoliseus patagonus). Threatened birds are peregrine falcon (Falco peregrinus) and Chaco eagle (Buteogallus coronatus). Endangered birds include yellow cardinal (Gubernatrix cristata) and Eskimo curlew (Numenius borealis). The Guanacache, Desaguadero y Bebedero system has rich biodiversity and supports more than 50 species of waterbirds. These include maguari stork (Ciconia maguari), southern screamer (Chauna torquata), white-faced ibis (Plegadis chihi), Chilean flamingo (Phoenicopterus chilensis) and dabbling ducks of the genus Anas. It is also used by migratory birds such as plovers and sandpipers.

Reptiles include Argentine red tegu (Tupinambis rufescens), false tomodon snake (Pseudotomodon trigonatus), Patagonian lancehead (Bothrops ammodytoides), boa constrictor (Boa constrictor), ringed hognose snake (Lystrophis semicinctus) and Chaco tortoise (Chelonoidis chilensis). Amphibians include Mendoza four-eyed frog (Pleurodema nebulosum). Endangered amphibians include La Rioja water frog (Telmatobius schreiteri) and Andalgala water frog (Telmatobius scrocchii). In the northern region about 10% of insect genera and 35% of insect species are endemic.

== Status ==
The World Wildlife Fund gives the ecoregion the status of "Vulnerable". The region has mostly been settled by people only in oases or areas near rivers where irrigation-based agriculture is possible. This process began in the late 19th century and continues today. The habitat in the settled areas has been greatly changed, with trees cleared for use as fuel and lumber and to make way for agriculture and mineral exploitation. 580,000 square kilometres (220,000 sq mi) of the ecoregion has been affected by erosion caused by deforestation and excessive grazing by sheep, goats and cattle. There is marked increase in desert areas, affecting the habitats of many native species. Many species are affected by fragmentation of their habitats.

The Guanacache, Desaguadero y Bebedero system has been affected by various natural and man-made changes that have caused the area of lagoons and marshes to shrink significantly. Some efforts are being made to rehabilitate them.

== Conservation ==
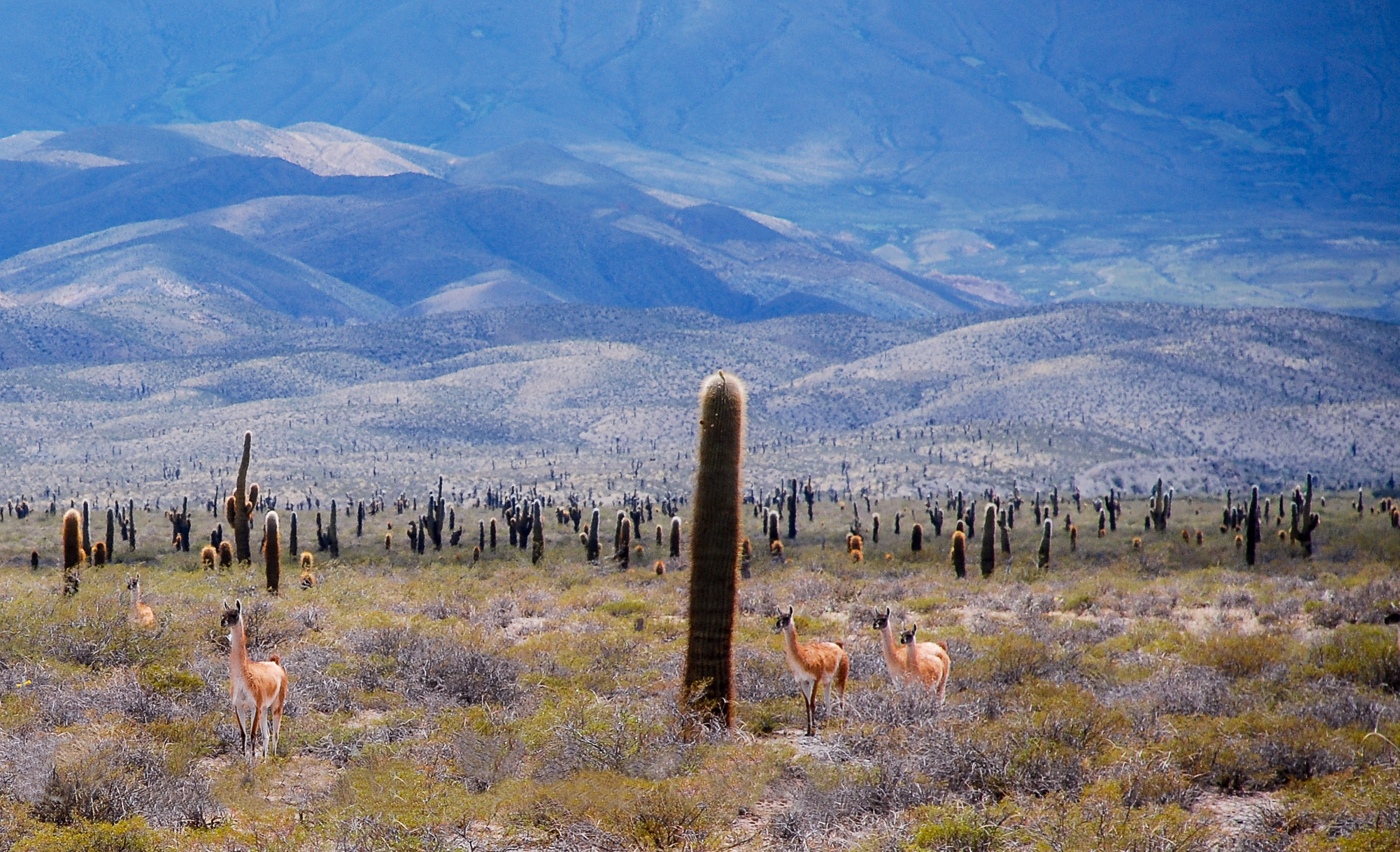
Los Cardones National Park

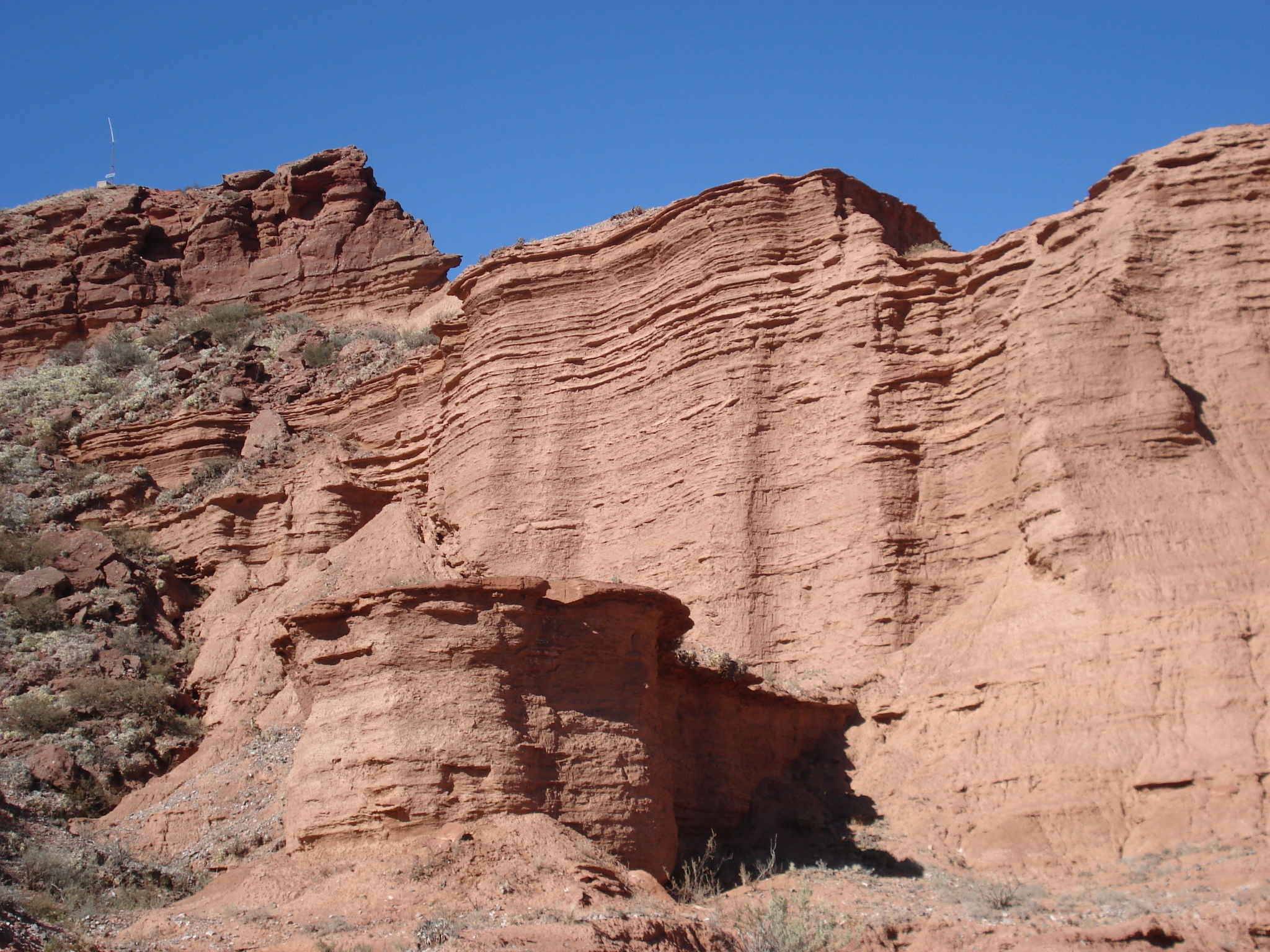
Rock wall in Sierra de las Quijadas National Park

5.37% of the ecoregion is in protected areas. Protected areas in the Low Monte include:

Protected area	Province
Caleta de los Loros Provincial Reserve	Río Negro Province
Complejo Islote Lobos Provincial Reserve	Río Negro Province
Divisadero Largo Provincial Reserve	Mendoza Province
El Mangrullo Provincial Reserve	Neuquén Province
La Humada Provincial Reserve	La Pampa Province
La Reforma Provincial Reserve	La Pampa Province
Lihué Calel National Park	La Pampa Province
Meseta de Somuncurá Protected Nature Area	
Península de Valdés Provincial Reserve	Chubut Province
Presidente Sarmiento Provincial Park	San Juan Province
Salitral Encantada Provincial Reserve	
Sierra de las Quijadas National Park	San Luis Province
Telteca Provincial Reserve	Mendoza Province
Valle Cretacico Protected Landscape	
Valle Fértil Provincial Reserve (partially within the ecoregion)	San Juan Province

Protected areas in the High Monte include:

Protected area	Province
Abra del Acay Nature Monument	
Angastaco Natural Monument	
Cerro Alcázar Natural Monument	Río Negro Province
Divisadero Largo Provincial Reserve	Mendoza Province
El Leoncito National Park	
Ischigualasto Provincial Park	San Juan Province
La Ciénaga Protected Nature Area	
Los Cardones National Park	Salta Province
Los Morrillos Wildlife Refuge	
Quebrada de Cafayate Managed Nature Reserve	
Quebrada de Humahuaca Protected Landscape	
San Guillermo National Park	San Juan Province
San Guillermo Provincial Park	San Juan Province
Talampaya National Park	La Rioja Province
Valle Fértil Provincial Reserve (partially within the ecoregion)	San Juan Province
Villavicencio Private Reserve	

== See also ==
- Monte Desert

== Sources ==
- Dellafiore, Claudia, Southern South America: Southern Argentina, stretching northward (NT0802), WWF: World Wildlife Fund
- Lagunas de Guanacache, Desaguadero y del Bebedero, Secretariat of the Ramsar Convention
- "Low Monte", Global Species, Myers Enterprise II
