= Arid Diagonal =

South American climate zone

Map showing the Köppen climate classification for South America. The arid diagonal can be seen in the form of the almost contiguous zone of BWh and BWk climate (red and pink on this map) running from Ecuador to Southern Patagonia.

The Arid Diagonal (Spanish: diagonal árida/arreica) is a contiguous zone of arid and semi-arid climate that traverses South America from coastal Peru in the Northwest to Argentine Patagonia in the Southeast, including large swathes of Bolivia and Chile. The Arid Diagonal encompasses a number of deserts, including the Sechura, Atacama, Monte, and Patagonian.

The Arid Diagonal acts to isolate the temperate and subtropical forests of Chile and southern Argentina from other forests of South America. Together with the Quaternary glaciations in the Southern Andes, the diagonal has controlled the distribution of vegetation throughout Chile and Argentina.

The concept of a South American Arid Diagonal was coined by French geographer Emmanuel de Martonne in his 1935 work Problème des régions arides Sud-Américaines. However, few works dealing with the Arid Diagonal mention this foundational text. The original Arid Diagonal of de Martonne went from Antofagasta in northern Chile to the northern coast of Argentine Patagonia. However, other authors like Margarita González Loyarte (1995) later extended it to the coast of northern Peru.

== Cause and origin ==
The northern portion of the Arid Diagonal is a result of the blocking of the trade winds by the barrier formed by the Central Andes and the South Pacific High. To the south in the westerlies, the rain shadow that the Southern Andes cast over eastern Patagonia similarly blocks moisture. South of Mendoza (32°53' S), the driest parts of the diagonal move away from the Andes as the mountains lose height, causing some humidity to penetrate; thus, at more southern latitudes the driest parts of the diagonal lie on the Atlantic coast of Patagonia.

The Arid Diagonal has existed since the Neogene. The origin of the aridity of the northern part of the diagonal is linked to two geologic events: a) the rise of the Andes, an event that led to the permanent block of both the westward flow of moisture along the tropics, and the eastward flow of moisture in Patagonia; and b) the permanent intrusion of cold Antarctic waters (the Humboldt Current) along South America's west coast. Together with the Quaternary glaciations in the Southern Andes, the diagonal controls the distribution of the vegetation types over Chile and Argentina.
