= High Monte =

Ecoregion in Argentina

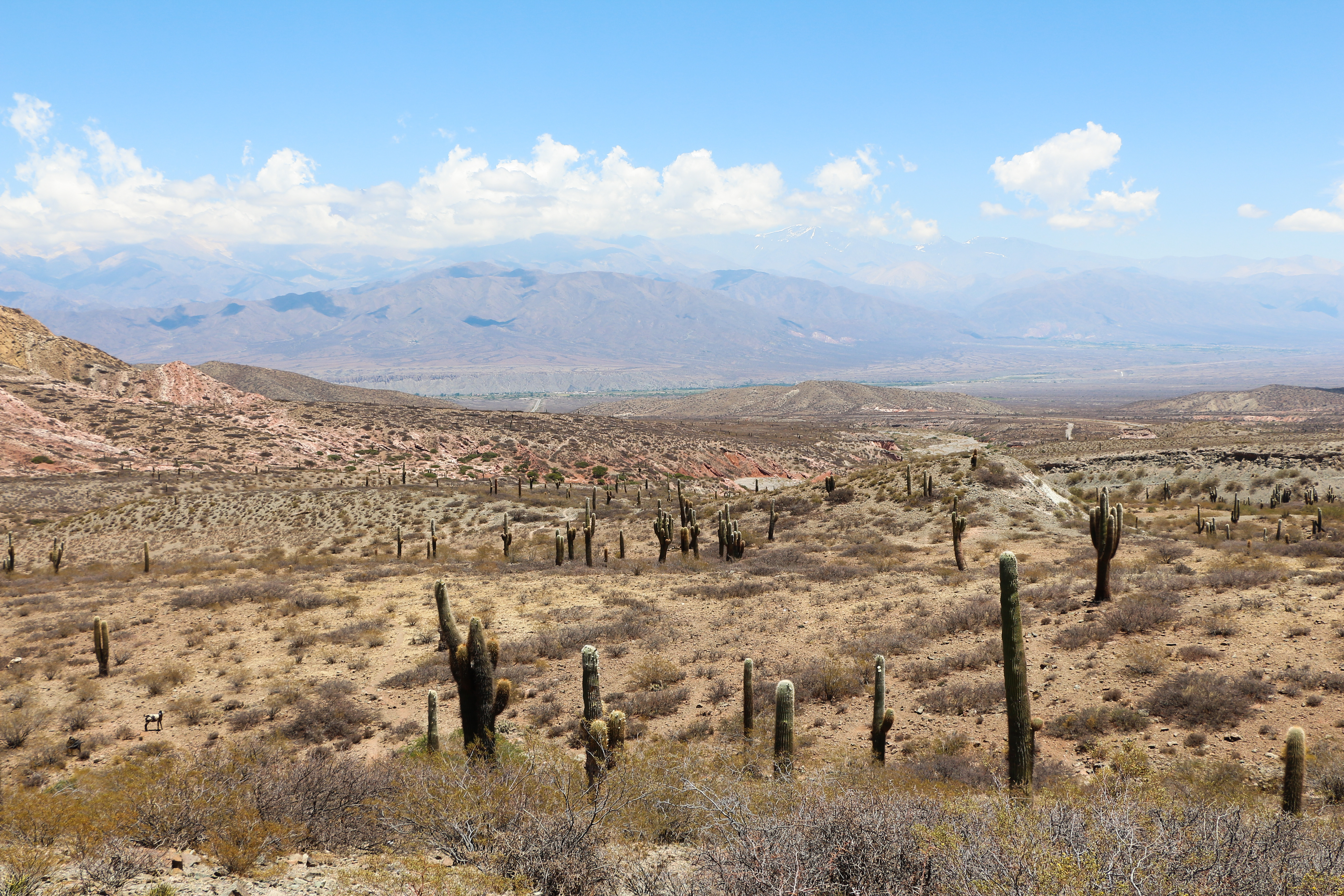
- High Monte landscape in Los Cardones National Park

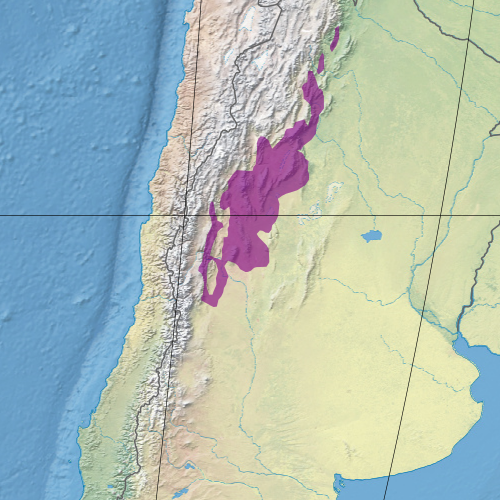
- Ecoregion territory (in purple)

Ecology
- Realm: Neotropical
- Biome: Montane grasslands and shrublands
- Borders: List: Central Andean puna; Dry Chaco; Low Monte; Southern Andean steppe; Southern Andean Yungas

Geography
- Area: 116,983 km^{2} (45,167 sq mi)
- Country: Argentina

Conservation
- Protected: 12.88%

The High Monte is a montane grasslands and shrublands ecoregion in Argentina.

== Geography ==
The High Monte is located on the eastern slopes of the Andes, extending from the vicinity of Salta (24º S) south to Mendoza (32º S). It is a landscape of mountains and closed basins which lie between the Sierras Pampeanas on the east and the main spine of the Andes to the west. The southern portion of the High Monte is drained by the Desaguadero River. The lower limit of soil cryoturbation along the eastern slope of Andes marks the upper boundary of the High Monte, extending up to 3000 meters at the northern end of the ecoregion, and between 1500 and 1700 meters elevation in Mendoza Province further south. The eastern transitions to the Chaco and Low Monte are more gradual.

== Climate ==
The climate is temperate and arid to semi-arid. Mean annual rainfall varies with location and relief, from less than 100 mm to 450 mm. Much of the ecoregion is in the rain shadow of the Sierras Pampeanas. Most rain falls during the southern hemisphere summer, when the South American monsoon system brings moist air to the ecoregion.

The High Monte is part of the Arid Diagonal, a belt of arid and semi-arid regions that extend from northwest to southeast across southern South America, from the Pacific to the Atlantic oceans.

== Flora ==
The characteristic vegetation is shrubland. Evergreen shrub species of Larrea, known as jarillas, are predominant. There are areas of open algarrobo (Prosopis) woodland where groundwater is available. Prosopis alba and Prosopis nigra are the most common algarrobo species, growing 4 to 16 meters in height. Characteristic Chaco shrubs like Bulnesia schickendantzii, Prosopis nigra, and Tragia geraniifolia grow along the eastern boundary with the Chaco.

The High Monte is home to many endemic plants, especially in the transition zone between the Monte and the humid Southern Andean Yungas forests. Of the 505 plant species endemic to northwestern Argentina, 57 to 73 endemic species are found in the Sierra del Aconquija transition zone, the highest concentration of endemic species in Argentina's northwest.

== Fauna ==
Native mammals include the guanaco (Lama guanicoe), puma (Puma concolor), South American gray fox (Lycalopex griseus), Patagonian weasel (Lyncodon patagonicus), screaming hairy armadillo (Chaetophractus vellerosus), pink fairy armadillo (Chlamyphorus truncatus), white-eared opossum (Didelphis albiventris), and white-bellied fat-tailed mouse opossum (Thylamys pallidior).

The Sierra del Tontal chinchilla rat (Abrocoma shistacea) and golden viscacha rat (Pipanacoctomys aureus) are endemic to the ecoregion. The mountain viscacha rat (Octomys mimax) is a near-endemic, ranging into an adjacent area of the Low Monte. Other native rodents include Akodon albiventer, Akodon simulator, Akodon spegazzinii, Andalgalomys olrogi Ctenomys coludo, Ctenomys famosus, Ctenomys knighti, Eligmodontia bolsonensis, Octodontomys gliroides, and Salinoctomys loschalchalerosorum.

The burrowing parrot (Cyanoliseus patagonus andinus) is native to the ecoregion, where it is an important disperser of algarrobo seeds.

== Protected areas ==
12.88% of the ecoregion is in protected areas. These include Talampaya National Park, El Leoncito National Park, Los Cardones National Park, and San Guillermo National Park.
