= Amanita nouhrae =

Conservation status
- Vulnerable (IUCN 3.1)

Scientific classification
- Kingdom: Fungi
- Division: Basidiomycota
- Class: Agaricomycetes
- Order: Agaricales
- Family: Amanitaceae
- Genus: Amanita
- Species: A. nouhrae

Binomial name
- Amanita nouhrae Truong, Kuhar & M.E. Sm. (2017)

Species of fungus

Amanita nouhrae is a rare mushroom in the Amanita genus.

== Description ==
Amanita nouhrae is a truffle-like sequestrate mushroom that is whitish and is relatively small with a ruffled surface.

== Rarity ==
Amanita nouhrae is exceedingly rare, with an estimated mature population of about 600 mushrooms.

== Ecology ==
Amanita nouhrae is a mycorrhizal mushroom. It forms relationships with Nothofagus or more specifically N. antarctica, N. dombeyi, and N. alpina.

== Habitat ==
Amanita nouhrae can be found in Argentina and Chile or more specifically the Andean Patagonia forest.
