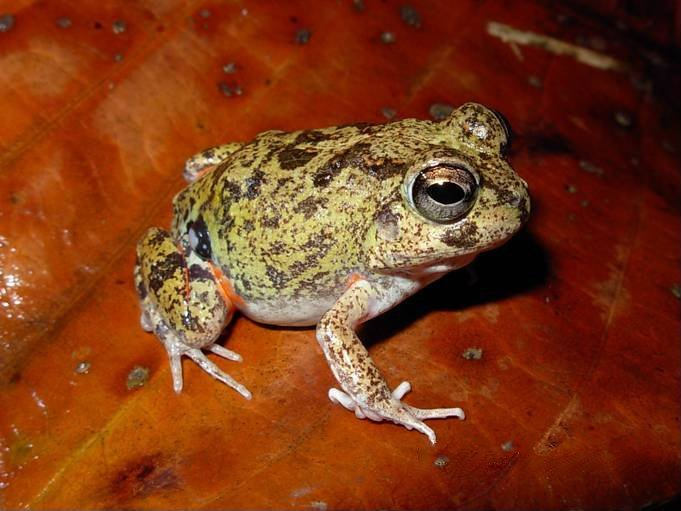

Conservation status
- Least Concern (IUCN 3.1)

Scientific classification
- Kingdom: Animalia
- Phylum: Chordata
- Class: Amphibia
- Order: Anura
- Family: Leptodactylidae
- Genus: Pleurodema
- Species: P. brachyops

Binomial name
- Pleurodema brachyops (Cope, 1869)

= Colombian four-eyed frog =

Species of amphibian

The Colombian four-eyed frog (Pleurodema brachyops; in Spanish: sapito lipon) is a species of frog in the family Leptodactylidae. It is found in an area stretching from Guyana and northern Brazil (Roraima state) through Venezuela (including Isla Margarita) and Colombia into Panama as well as the Dutch Caribbean.

== Etymology ==
The common name "four-eyed frog" refers to two inguinal poison glands that resemble eyes.

== Behavior ==
When threatened, the frog lowers its head and raises its rear. When the frog adopts this posture, the poison glands are also raised toward the predator. The predator may also confuse the frog's raised posterior for the head of a larger animal.

== Habitat ==
The natural habitat of the Colombian four-eyed frog is open savanna and grassland and has been found in some modified habitats. Scientists have seen it between 0 and 500 m (0 and 1,640 ft) above sea level and have reported it in protected areas.

== Reproduction ==
When the seasonal rains begin, the frogs emerge from the sand. They can breed in ephemeral and permanent pools of water. The adult frog makes a foam nest for the eggs.

== Threats ==
The IUCN classifies this species as least concern of extinction. It has large areas of suitable habitat remaining.
