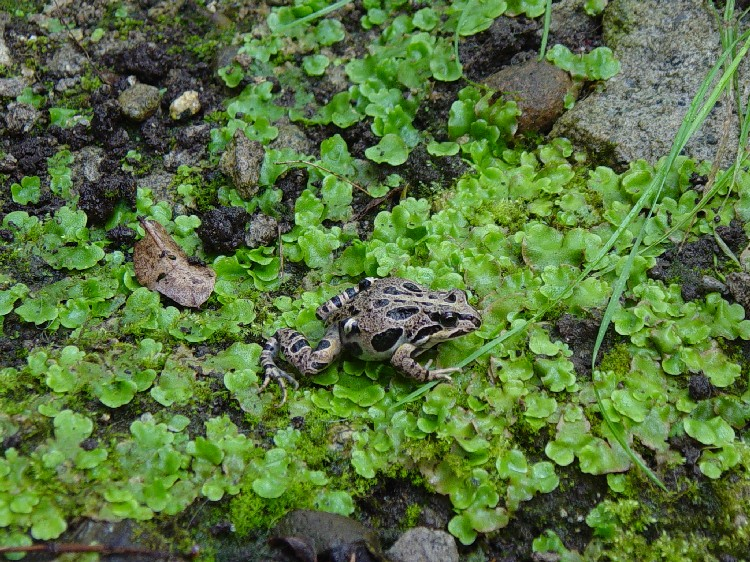

Conservation status
- Least Concern (IUCN 3.1)

Scientific classification
- Kingdom: Animalia
- Phylum: Chordata
- Class: Amphibia
- Order: Anura
- Family: Leptodactylidae
- Genus: Pleurodema
- Species: P. thaul

Binomial name
- Pleurodema thaul (Lesson, 1826)

= Pleurodema thaul =

Species of frog

Pleurodema thaul, the Chilean four-eyed frog is a species of frog in the family Leptodactylidae. It is found in Argentina and Chile.

== Description ==
Individuals vary in size between 3 and 5 cm in snout-vent length. The female frogs are larger than the males. The skin of the dorsum can be yellow, green, or dark green in color. The frogs have symmetrical brown spots. The belly is white in color.

== Diet ==
They feed on arthropods such as flies and spiders.

== Habitat ==
In Chile they are found from the Antofagasta region to the Aysén Region, while in Argentina they live in areas close to the Andes in the provinces of Neuquén, Rio Negro, and Chubut.

== Reproduction ==
Reproduction occurs almost throughout the year. This frog can reproduce in almost any body of water. The tadpoles are gray with dark spots.

== Danger ==
The IUCN classifies this frog as least concern of extinction. In some parts of the range, some of the frogs may be in some danger from fire, water pollution from farms and other industry, land conversion, and drought.
