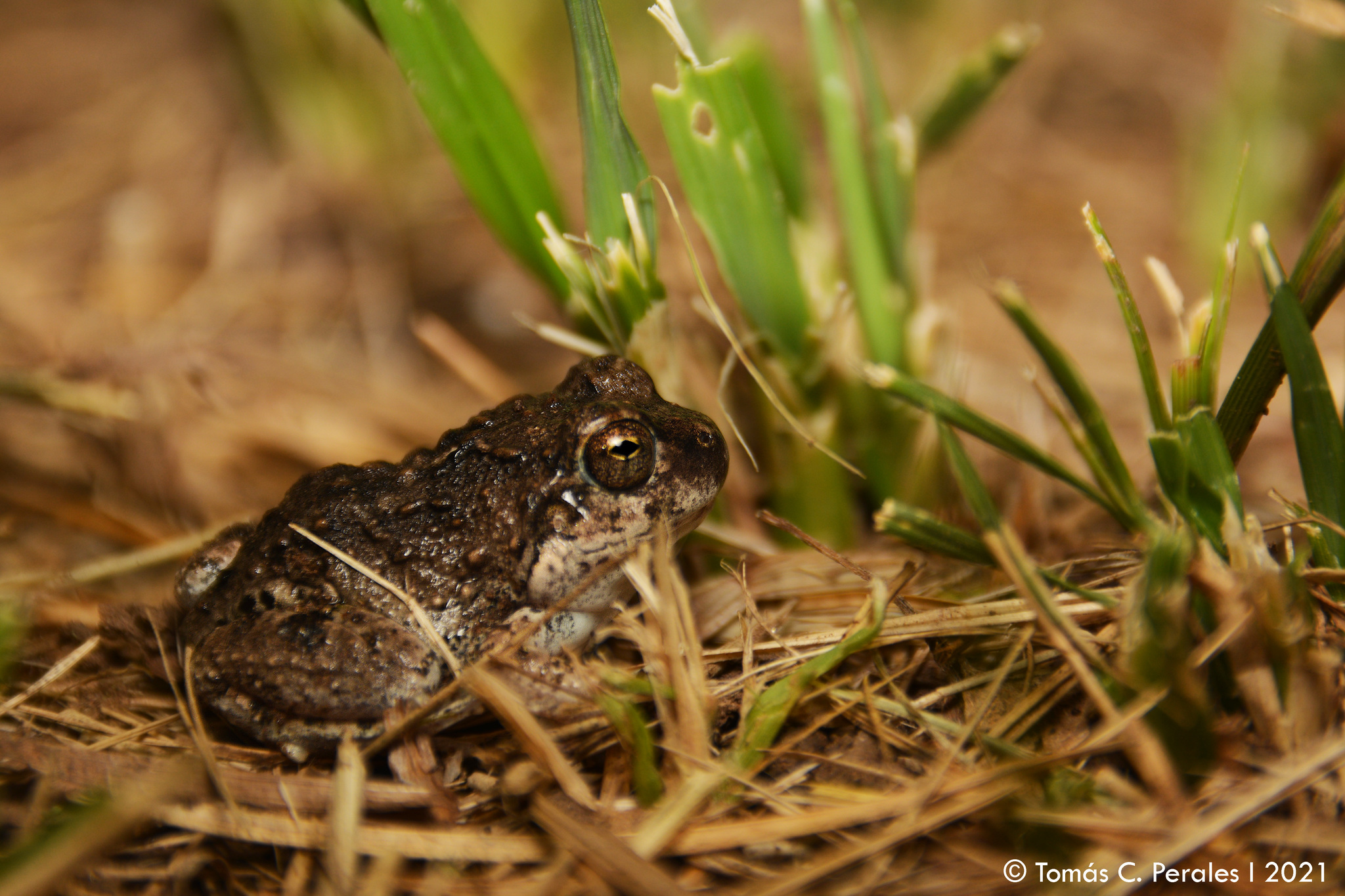

Conservation status
- Least Concern (IUCN 3.1)

Scientific classification
- Kingdom: Animalia
- Phylum: Chordata
- Class: Amphibia
- Order: Anura
- Family: Leptodactylidae
- Genus: Pleurodema
- Species: P. tucumanum

Binomial name
- Pleurodema tucumanum Parker, 1927

Synonyms
- Pleurodema tucumana Parker, 1927

= Pleurodema tucumanum =

Species of frog

Pleurodema tucumanum, the spotted-flanks four-eyed frog, is a species of frog in the family Leptodactylidae. It is endemic to Argentina.

== Habitat ==
This terrestrial frog is found in shrubland between 80 and 1,258 m (260 and 4,130 ft) above sea level. It has also been seen in agricultural habitats.

Scientists have reported the frog in protected areas: Parque Nacional Calilegua, Parque Nacional Sierra de las Quijadas, and Parque Provincial Ischigualasto.

== Reproduction ==
This frog is an explosive breeder. The male frogs sit in or near the water and call to the female frogs. The adult frogs make a foam nest for the eggs in pools of water.

== Threats ==
The IUCN classifies this frog as least concern of extinction.
