= Pleurodema alium =

Conservation status
- Least Concern (IUCN 3.1)

Scientific classification
- Kingdom: Animalia
- Phylum: Chordata
- Class: Amphibia
- Order: Anura
- Family: Leptodactylidae
- Genus: Pleurodema
- Species: P. alium

Binomial name
- Pleurodema alium Maciel and Nunes, 2010

Species of frog

Pleurodema alium is a species of frog in the family Leptodactylidae. It is endemic to Brazil.

== Habitat ==
This species is fossorial, spending considerable time underground or buried in sand. This frog has been found in rocky highland meadows. It has been observed in cultivated fields and animal pasture. Scientists have seen it between 500 and 970 m (1,640 and 3,180 ft) above sea level.

Scientists saw the frog in a protected place, Parque Nacional de Grão Mogol.

== Reproduction ==
This frog breeds in water through larval development.

== Threats ==
The IUCN Red List classifies this species as least concern of extinction. In some parts of its range, it may be in some danger from mining, agriculture, cattle grazing, and fires set for land conversion and field maintenance.

== Original description ==
- Maciel DB; Nunes I (2010). "A new species of four-eyed frog genus Pleurodema Tschudi, 1838 (Anura: Leiuperidae) from the rock meadows of Espinhaco range, Brazil". Zootaxa. 2640: 53–61.
