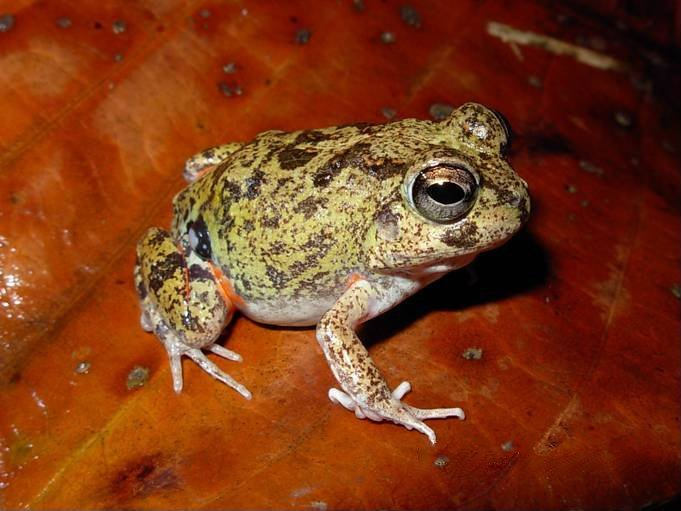
- Pleurodema brachyops

Scientific classification
- Kingdom: Animalia
- Phylum: Chordata
- Class: Amphibia
- Order: Anura
- Family: Leptodactylidae
- Subfamily: Leiuperinae
- Genus: Pleurodema; Tschudi, 1838

Type species
- Pleurodema bibroni Tschudi, 1838

Species
- 15, see the text.

= Pleurodema =

Genus of amphibians

Pleurodema is a genus of frogs in the family Leptodactylidae. The genus is endemic to South America. Species in the genus Pleurodema are sometimes known under the common name four-eyed frogs, although this common name can also refer to a particular species, Pleurodema bibroni. The common name is a reference to two inguinal poison glands that resemble eyes. When threatened, the frog lowers its head and raises its rear. When the frog adopts this posture, the poison glands are also raised toward the predator. The predator may also confuse the frog's raised posterior for the head of a larger animal.

== Species ==
The genus contains the following 15 species:

- Pleurodema alium (Maciel & Nunes, 2010)
- Pleurodema bibroni (Tschudi, 1838)
- Pleurodema borellii (Peracca, 1895)
- Pleurodema brachyops (Cope, 1869)
- Pleurodema bufoninum (Bell, 1843)
- Pleurodema cinereum (Cope, 1878)
- Pleurodema cordobae (Valetti, Salas & Martino, 2009)
- Pleurodema diplolister (W. Peters, 1870)
- Pleurodema guayapae (Barrio, 1964)
- Pleurodema kriegi (L. Müller, 1926)
- Pleurodema marmoratum (A.M.C. Duméril & Bibron, 1841)
- Pleurodema nebulosum (Burmeister, 1861)
- Pleurodema somuncurense (Cei, 1969)
- Pleurodema thaul (Lesson, 1827)
- Pleurodema tucumanum (H. Parker, 1927)
