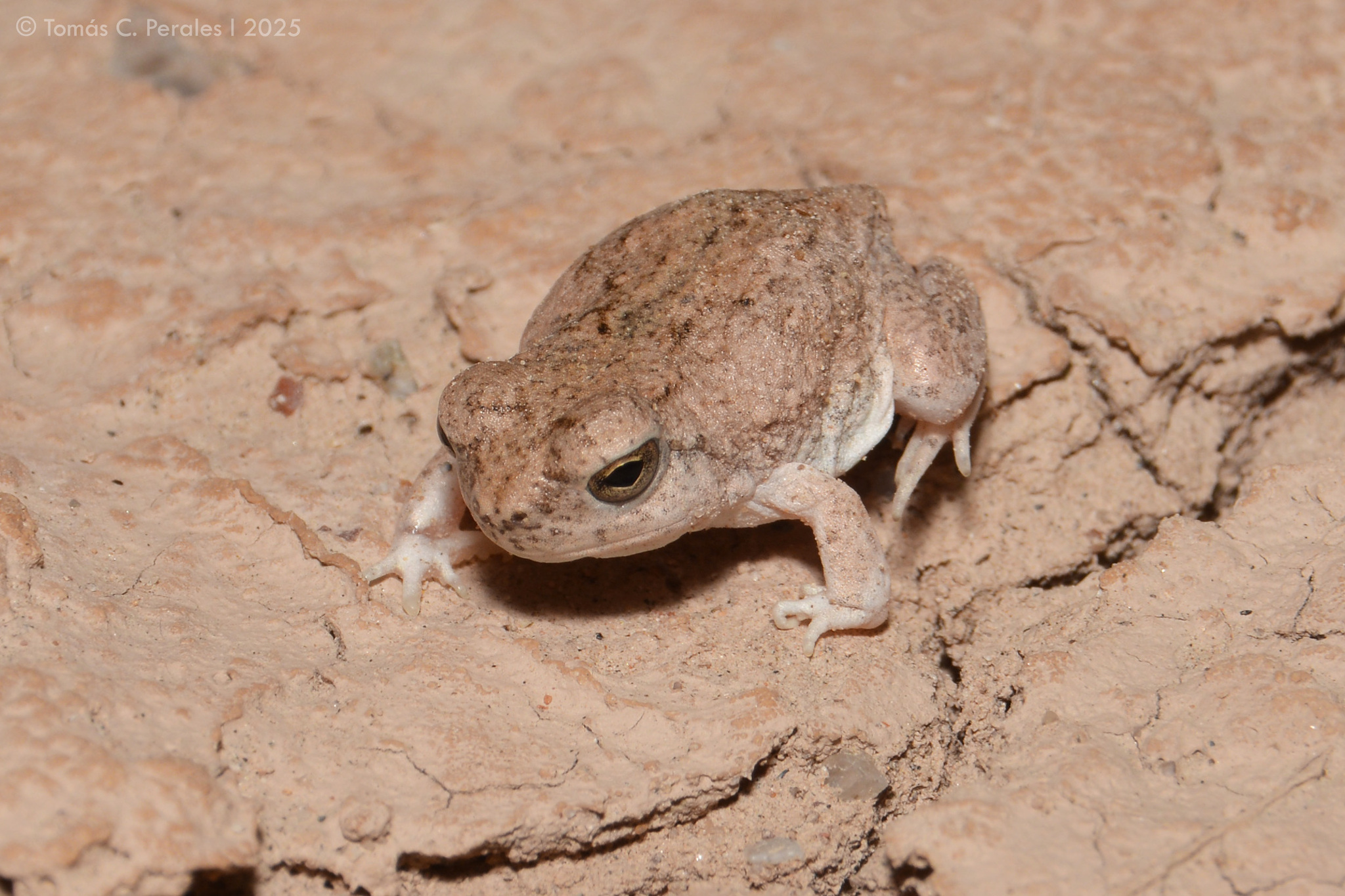

Conservation status
- Least Concern (IUCN 3.1)

Scientific classification
- Kingdom: Animalia
- Phylum: Chordata
- Class: Amphibia
- Order: Anura
- Family: Leptodactylidae
- Genus: Pleurodema
- Species: P. guayapae

Binomial name
- Pleurodema guayapae Barrio, 1964

= Pleurodema guayapae =

Species of frog

Pleurodema guayapae is a species of frog in the family Leptodactylidae. It is found in Argentina and Bolivia and suspected in Paraguay.

== Description ==
This frog measures about 40 - 45 mm in snout-vent length. The skin of the dorsum is gray in color, with spots. The belly is white in color.

== Habitat ==
This terrestrial frog lives open areas, such as semiarid and saline habitats in the Chaco. Scientists have reported it between 80 and 520 m (260 and 1,710 ft) above sea level.

Scientists have reported the frog in Parque Nacional Sierra de las Quijadas and Reserva Provincial Chancaní.

== Reproduction ==
This frog is an explosive breeder. The male and female frog make a foam nest during amplexus. This protects the eggs from desiccation and predators, such as Ceratophrys cranwelli tadpoles. The nests are 6 - 9 cm in diameter and 1 - 3 cm high. Each egg is about 1.44 mm in diameter. Under laboratory conditions, the eggs take 26-30 hours to hatch into tadpoles. The tadpoles are light in color.

== Threats ==
The IUCN classifies this species as least concern of extinction, with no specific threats.
