= Bosque Andino Patagónico =

Forest in Chile and Argentina

Bosque Andino Patagónico, also known as Patagonian Andean forest, is a type of temperate to cold forest located in western Patagonia in Argentina and also in southern Chile, at the southern end of South America. The climate here is influenced by humid air masses moving in from the Pacific Ocean which lose most of their moisture as they rise over the Andes. The flora is dominated by trees, usually of the genus Nothofagus.

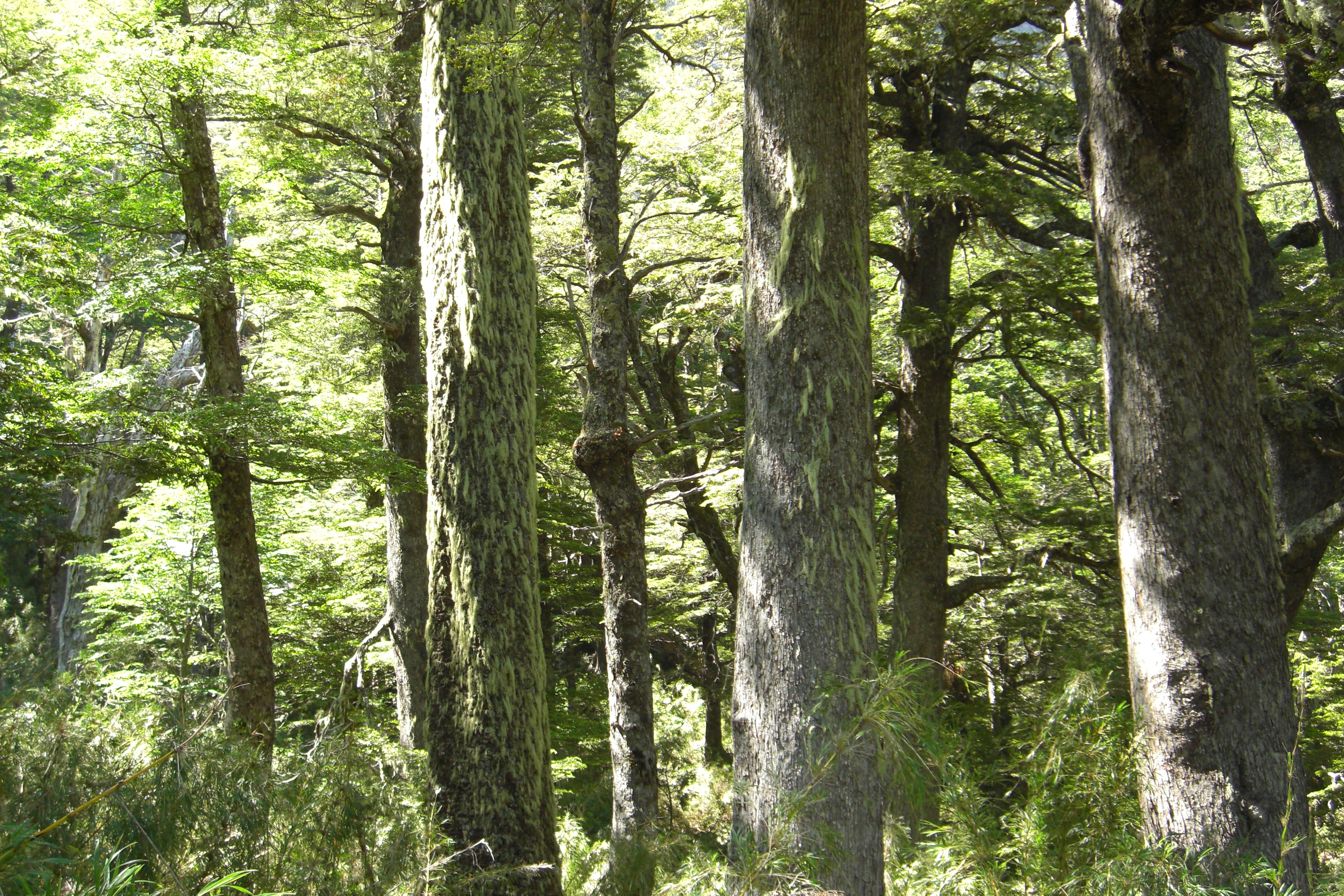
Old-growth southern beech forest

== Geography ==
The Bosque Andino Patagónico represents one of the few relatively undisturbed temperate forests that has been little changed by man. It occupies approximately 6.5 million hectares of land. It is culturally significant because of its archaeological and historical value.

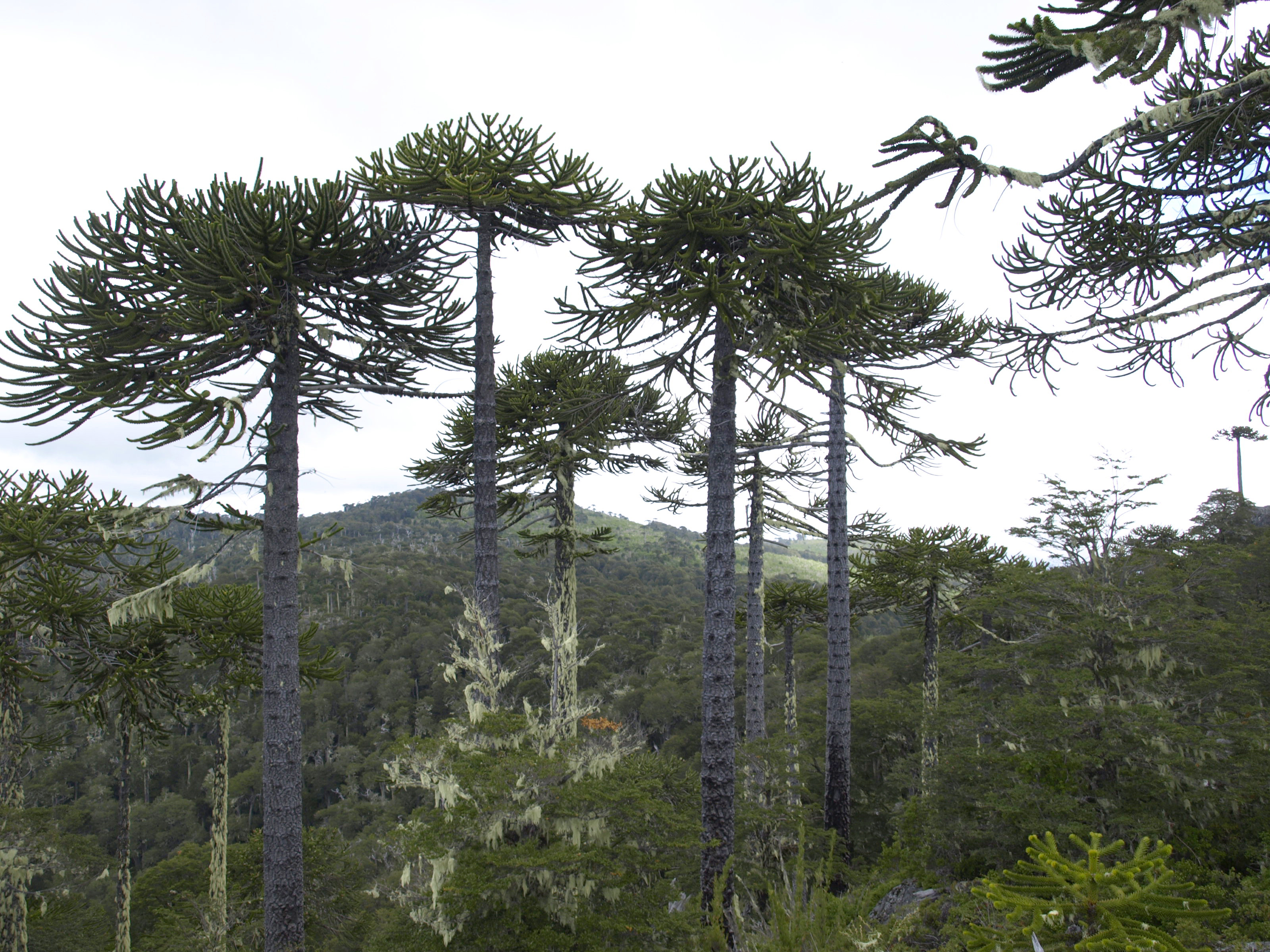
Mixed forest of Araucaria and Nothofagus dombeyi in Nahuelbuta National Park, Chile

The Andean Patagonian forest region is located between 37°S and 55°S latitude, and clothes both sides of the Cordillera. The forest extends for about 2,200 kilometres (1,400 mi) parallel to the Pacific coast, extending from just south of Mendoza in Argentina to the southern end of Santa Cruz Province and to the island portion of the province of Tierra del Fuego. It is a narrow strip of land, with a maximum width of 75 km (47 mi), dwindling to zero in places near the Chubut River and Santa Cruz Province. It is bounded to the east by the Patagonian Desert. Ecologically the forest have no equivalent in the Northern Hemisphere. This is indebted to distinct biota histories and environmental differences.

The forest is divided into four regions: deciduous forest, Magellan forest, Valdivia forest and Del Pehuén. Rainfall is more plentiful in the Andean area than in other parts of Patagonia and there are several lakes, reservoirs and hydro-electric projects within the forested area. There is also an increase in population in nearby urban areas and greater tourism in the forest, resulting in increasing pollution.

== Climate ==
The climate of these forests is governed by atmospheric, topographical and oceanic factors. The prevailing westerly winds are laden with moisture and come from the Pacific Ocean, being linked to the South Pacific subtropical anticyclone. Frontal systems move inland and precipitation is high at low altitudes in southern Patagonia, making the fiord region one of the wettest places on earth outside the tropics, with rainfall topping 7,000 mm (276 in) per year in places. To the east of the Andes precipitation declines to nearly nil. In northern Patagonia, the seasons vary as the anticyclone oscillates northwards in summer and southwards in winter. More frontal systems cross the coast during the winter and that is the season when most precipitation occurs on the western slopes of the mountains. Some places suffer prolonged droughts in summer, and further east, on the Patagonian plateau, the air is no longer moist and little rain falls at any time of year. Over a west-east distance of 80 kilometres (50 mi), precipitation can fall from 2,000 mm (79 in) per year to 200 mm (8 in).

On the western side of the Andes, the cold Humboldt Current and prevailing westerly winds help to reduce temperature variations and the mean air temperature is 12 °C (54 °F) at 36°S and is 6 °C (43 °F) at 55°S. On the eastern side of the mountains the temperature variations are much more severe and there is a more continental climate.

== Soils ==
Much of the soils around the Andes are derived from volcanic material. In this soils weathering has produced water-retentive allophane that can allow the vegetation to withstand drought. These soils develop chiefly from volcanic ash and wind-redeposited ash deposits that can reach several meters in height. These kind of soils have high porosity and low bulk density. Locally they are known as trumao which are Andosols. Other soil types include ñadis which are aquepts usually developed on top of glacifluvial material. While trumaos originate from recent ashes on ancient ashes brown and red-clay soils develop, these soils are not restricted to old ash parent material but do also originate from metamorphic rocks in the Chilean Coast Range.

In the high Andes, the soils are known as lithosols and contain little organic matter. Much of the ground here may be subject to permafrost and the vegetation is scant, with mosses and lichens growing on the rocks and scree. Generally speaking soils in the northern Argentine area are arranged in the following pattern by decreasing longitude and altitude lithosols, andosols, cambisols and regosols. The last ones occur at the boundary with the Patagonian steppe.

== Regions ==
=== Deciduous forest ===
This is the easternmost and driest part of the forest and extends from Neuquén to Tierra del Fuego. The three main species here are all deciduous, the lenga beech (Nothofagus pumilio), the Antarctic beech (Nothofagus antarctica), which is found typically in lower and damp locations, and the mountain cypress (Austrocedrus chilensis). Other species present are the radal (Lomatia hirsuta), the raulí beech (Nothofagus alpina) and the roble beech (Nothofagus obliqua). Underneath these large trees there is usually a lower layer which includes such shrubs and small trees as boxleaf azara (Azara microphylla), Chilean wineberry (Aristotelia chilensis), Darwin's barberry (Berberis darwinii, box-leaved barberry (Berberis microphylla) and the bamboo coligüe cane (Chusquea culeou), as well as a wide range of herbs.

=== Magellanic forest ===
The southern end of the forest is characterised by a colder, dry climate and the number of species growing here are more limited. The predominant tree is the evergreen Magellan's beech (Nothofagus betuloides), sometimes accompanied by the canelo (Drimys winteri). The understorey shrubs are similar to the deciduous forest apart from the absence of bamboo. There are also peat bogs with various species of sphagnum moss and plants such as the sundew (Drosera uniflora).

=== Valdivian forest ===
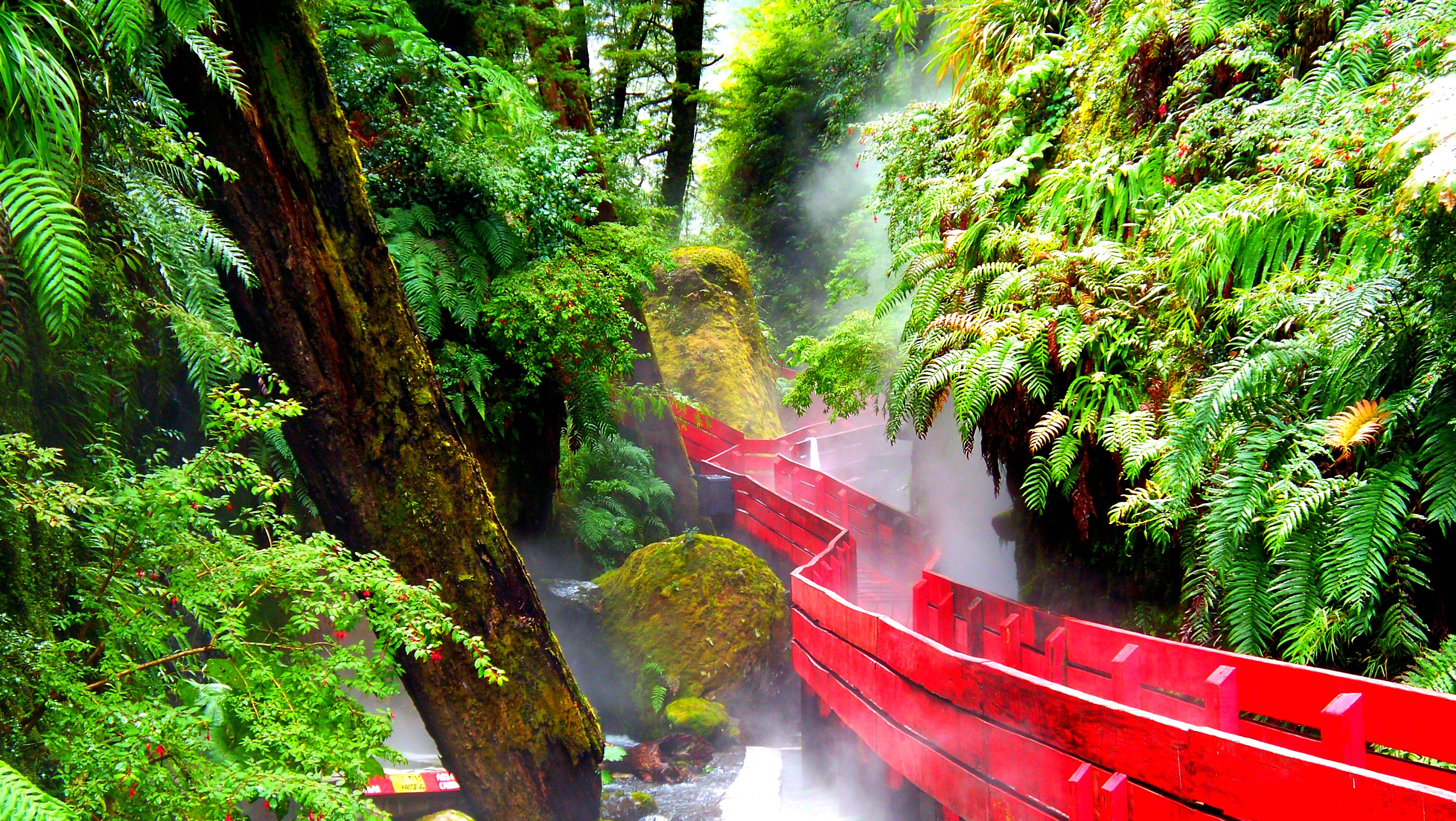
Valdivian vegetation around Termas Geométricas near Coñaripe.

The Valdivian forest lies in a discontinuous belt on the west of the area. The precipitation is greater here. Some parts, such as at Puerto Blest near the Rio Negro (Argentina), have an average rainfall of 4,000 mm (157 in) per year, and the impression is of jungle. Here the most common trees are the coihue (Nothofagus dombeyi), the Patagonian cypress (Fitzroya cupressoides), the Chilean hazel (Gevuina avellana), the ulmo (Eucryphia cordifolia), the Guaitecas cypress (Pilgerodendron uviferum), the podocarp (Podocarpus nubigenus) and the female maniu (Saxegothaea conspicua). There is a dense understorey of bamboos, the hardy fuchsia (Fuchsia magellanica), reeds and ferns.

Mammals present in the Valdivian forest include an arboreal marsupial, the monito del monte (Dromiciops gliroides), the world's smallest deer, the southern pudú (Pudu puda), and South America's smallest cat, the kodkod (Leopardus guigna). The giant snail (Macrocyclis peruvianus), with a shell length of 6.5 cm (2.6 in), is also found here.

=== Del Pehuén ===
This region lies in the centre of the forest to the west of Neuquén. The dominant species here is the Chilean pine (Araucaria araucana). This area has been the location of much logging in the past. The understorey is scanty and consists of such shrubs as the bamboo caña coligüe (Chusquea culeou) and the box-leaved barberry (Berberis buxifolia).

== Fauna ==
The fauna of the Andean Patagonian forest region is very varied with many endemic species. Predatory mammals include the puma (Puma concolor), the culpeo (Lycalopex culpaeus), the southern river otter (Lontra provocax) and the Geoffroy's cat (Leopardus geoffroyi). Other mammals include Humboldt's hog-nosed skunk (Conepatus humboldtii), the Patagonian mara (Dolichotis patagonum), the guanaco (Lama guanicoe), the south Andean deer (Hippocamelus bisulcus) and numerous species of rodents.

There is a wide range of bird life, ranging from the black-chested buzzard-eagle (Geranoaetus melanoleucus) and Magellanic woodpecker (Campephilus magellanicus) to the Chilean swallow (Tachycineta meyeni) and the torrent duck (Merganetta armata). Amphibians are represented by the toad (Rhinella spinulosa), the large four-eyed frog (Pleurodema bufoninum), Pleurodema bibroni and the Darwin's frog (Rhinoderma darwinii), and there are also numerous lizards and the Peru slender snake (Tachymenis peruviana). There are many species of native fish in the lakes and rivers.

== Rock art ==
Rock paintings have been found in the valley of the Rio Manso in north Patagonia, both in Argentina and in Chile. The paintings are largely abstract and mostly consist of complex patterns of straight lines, with zig-zag lines, diamonds and triangles, and sometimes concentric circles. There is some figurative art showing humans and animals and the colour most often used is different shades of red. The style of the work makes it likely to have been performed by hunter-gatherers in the late Holocene era.

== Bibliography ==
- Veblen, Thomas T. (2007). "Temperate Forest of the Southern Andean Region". In Veblen, Thomas T.; Young, Kenneth R.; Orme, Anthony R. (eds.). Physical Geography of South America. Oxford University Press. pp. 217–331. ISBN 978-0-19-531341-3.
