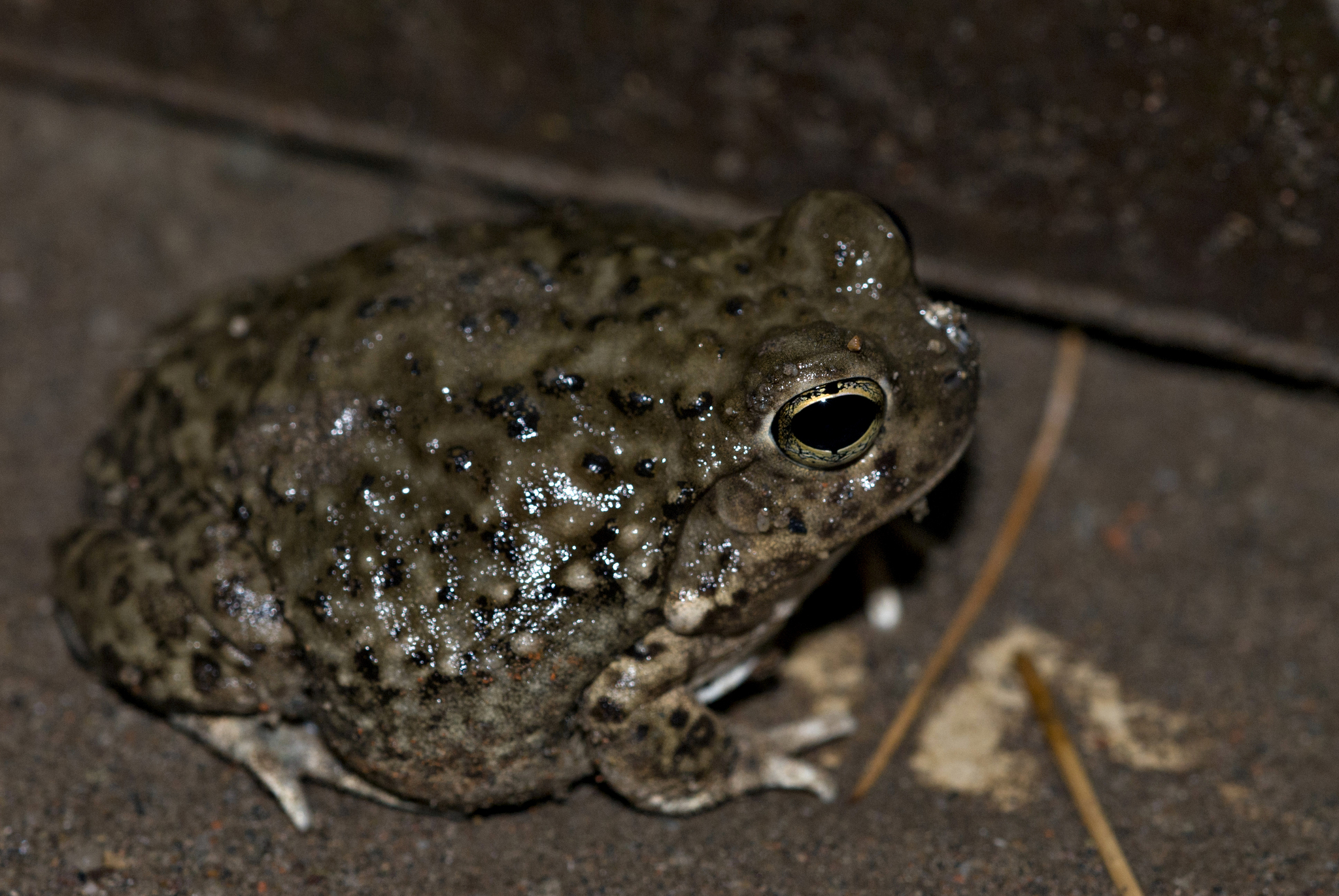

Conservation status
- Least Concern (IUCN 3.1)

Scientific classification
- Kingdom: Animalia
- Phylum: Chordata
- Class: Amphibia
- Order: Anura
- Family: Leptodactylidae
- Genus: Pleurodema
- Species: P. nebulosum

Binomial name
- Pleurodema nebulosum (Burmeister, 1861)

Synonyms
- Pleurodema nebulosa (Burmeister, 1861)

= Pleurodema nebulosum =

Species of frog

Pleurodema nebulosum is a species of frog in the family Leptodactylidae. It is endemic to Argentina.

== Habitat ==
Its natural habitats are temperate shrubland, subtropical or tropical dry shrubland, temperate grassland, subtropical or tropical dry lowland grassland, subtropical or tropical seasonally wet or flooded lowland grassland, subtropical or tropical high-altitude grassland, intermittent freshwater marshes, arable land, pastureland, ponds, irrigated land, and seasonally flooded agricultural land. Scientists have seen it between 132 and 2,258 m (433 and 7,408 ft) above sea level.

Scientists have reported the frog in protected places: Parque Nacional Sierra de las Quijadas, Reserva Provincial Telteca, Parque Provincial Ischigualasto, and Reserva Ñacuñán.

== Reproduction ==
This frog reproduces explosively during November and December. The male and female frog make a foam nest that floats on temporary bodies of water.

== Threats ==
The IUCN classifies this species as least concern.
