= Mountain viscacha rat =

Conservation status
- Least Concern (IUCN 3.1)

Scientific classification
- Kingdom: Animalia
- Phylum: Chordata
- Class: Mammalia
- Order: Rodentia
- Family: Octodontidae
- Genus: Octomys; Thomas, 1920
- Species: O. mimax

Binomial name
- Octomys mimax Thomas, 1920
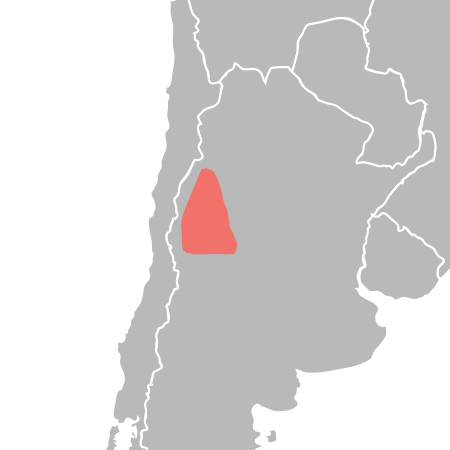
- Octomys mimax distribution

Species of rodent

The mountain viscacha rat or mountain vizcacha rat (Octomys mimax), historically viscacha rat or vizcacha rat, is a species of rodent in the family Octodontidae. It is endemic to Argentina.

It is the only living species within the genus Octomys. This diploid genus (2n = 56) may be ancestral to the two unusual suspected tetraploid species Tympanoctomys barrerae and Pipanacoctomys aureus. However, some genetic studies have rejected any polyploidism in mammals as unlikely, and suggests that amplification and dispersion of repetitive sequences best explain the large genome size.

== Description ==
The mountain viscacha rat is a rat-like animal with a head-body length of about 11 to 18 centimetres (4.3 to 7.1 in) and weighing from 85 to 121 grams (3.0 to 4.3 oz). The feet are relatively long, while the tail measures 12 to 16 centimetres (4.7 to 6.3 in). It has light brown fur with white underparts and a bushy tail.

Unusual features of the viscacha rat include greatly enlarged auditory bullae, and the presence of numerous whiskers on the roof of the mouth behind the incisor teeth. The exact function of the whiskers is unclear, but they may enable the animal to sense the position of food inside the mouth.

== Distribution and habitat ==
Mountain viscacha rats are found only in the Monte Desert region of northwestern Argentina, specifically in the provinces of Catamarca, La Rioja, San Luis, San Juan. They inhabit rocky desert and semidesert environments up to 800 metres (2,600 ft) above sea level.

== Behaviour ==
Mountain viscacha rats are nocturnal and solitary, spending the day sheltering in rock crevices. Although it does not construct burrows, it may place pieces of cactus close to crevice entrances to help protect against predators. Individuals occupy large home ranges of around 12,300 square metres (3.0 acres), often overlapping with those of their neighbours. They are herbivorous, feeding on the leaves and seeds of shrubland vegetation. During the dry season, their diet consists largely of the leaves of Prosopis trees, supplemented by caperbushes and alkaliweeds. During the wet season, they eat more seeds and fruit, including those from plants such as Maytenus and boxthorn shrubs.
