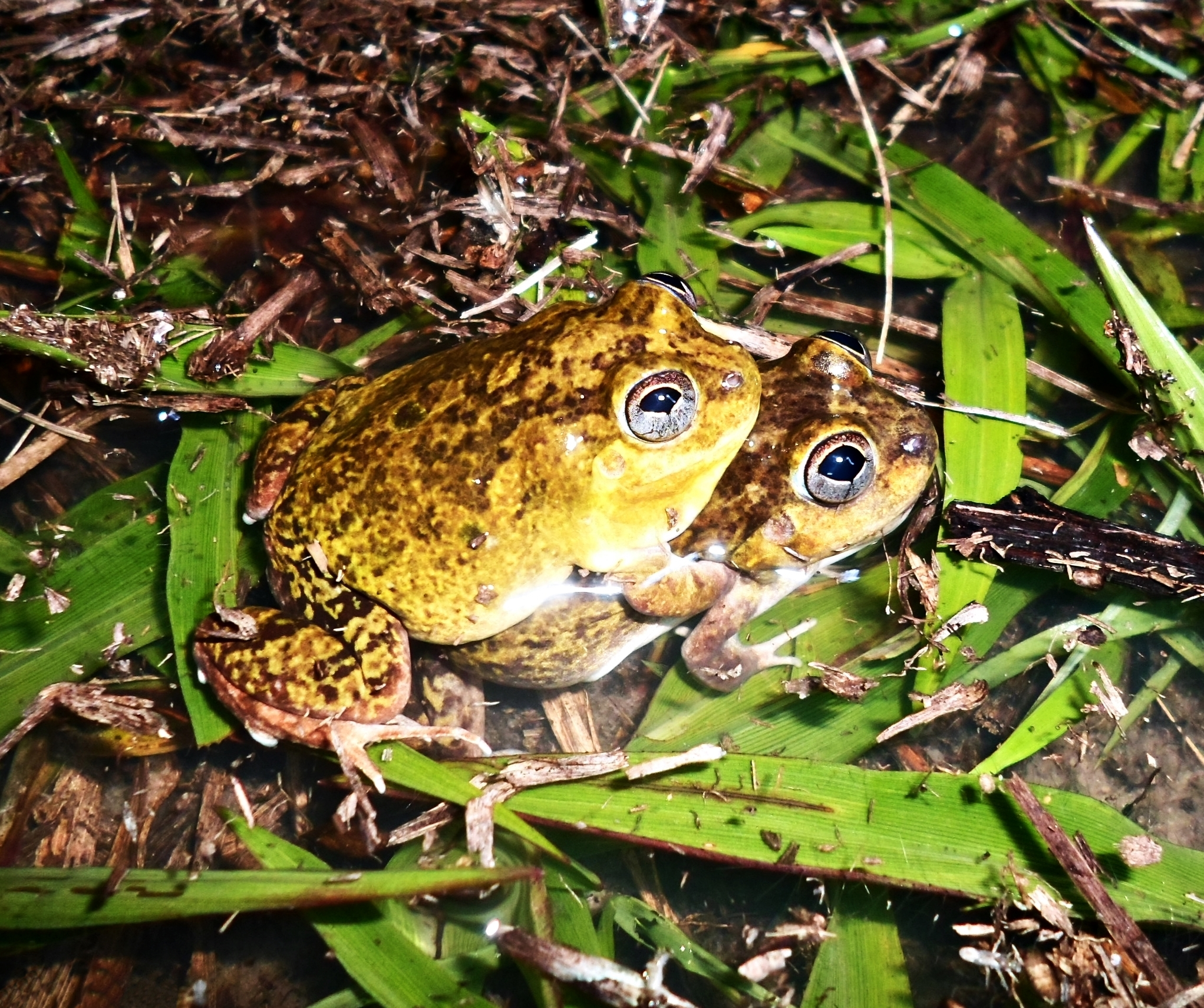

Conservation status
- Least Concern (IUCN 3.1)

Scientific classification
- Kingdom: Animalia
- Phylum: Chordata
- Class: Amphibia
- Order: Anura
- Family: Leptodactylidae
- Genus: Pleurodema
- Species: P. diplolister

Binomial name
- Pleurodema diplolister (Peters, 1870)

Synonyms
- Pleurodema diplolistris

= Pleurodema diplolister =

Species of amphibian

Pleurodema diplolister, the Peters' four-eyed frog, is a species of frog in the family Leptodactylidae. It is endemic to Brazil.

== Etymology ==
The common name "four-eyed frog" refers to two inguinal poison glands that resemble eyes.

== Behavior ==
When threatened, the frog lowers its head and raises its rear. When the frog adopts this posture, the poison glands are also raised toward the predator. The predator may also confuse the frog's raised posterior for the head of a larger animal.

== Habitat ==
This fossorial frog spends significant time underground or buried in the sand. It lives in dry savannah and shrubland in Caatinga and Cerrado biomes and near coastal sand dunes. People also see the frog in pastureland, so it may have some tolerance to habitat disturbance. Scientists have seen it between 0 and 750 m (0 and 2,460 ft) above sea level.

Scientists have reported the frog in protected places.

== Reproduction ==
This frog is an explosive breeder, reproducing in pools of water. The adult frog makes a foam nest for the eggs. The tadpoles develop quickly.

== Threats ==
The IUCN classifies this frog as least concern of extinction. In some places, it might be in some danger from habitat loss.
