= Monte Desert =

Desert in Argentina

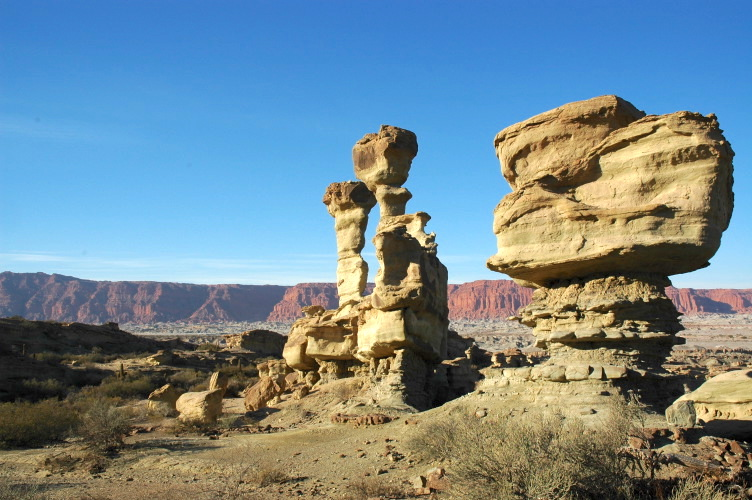
- Landforms created by erosion in the Monte Desert at Ischigualasto, Argentina.

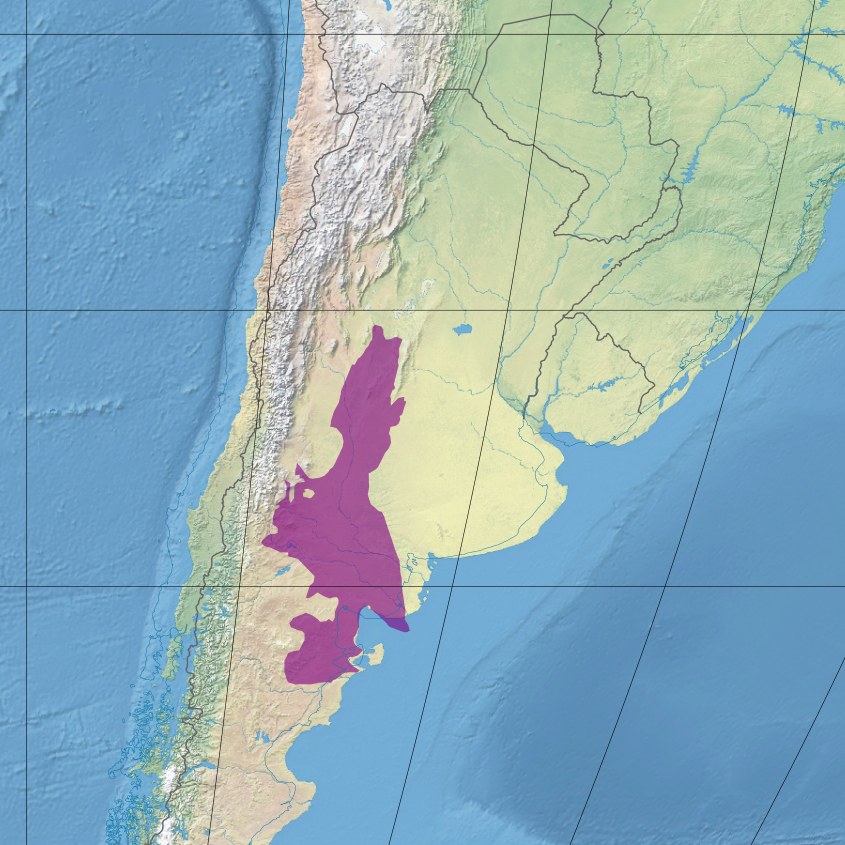
- Ecoregion territory (in purple)

Geography
- Country: Argentina

The Monte Desert is a South American desert, lying entirely within Argentina and covering approximately the submontane areas of Catamarca, La Rioja, San Juan, San Luis and Mendoza Provinces, plus the western half of La Pampa Province and the extreme north of Río Negro Province and Chubut Province. The desert lies southeast of the Atacama Desert in Chile and Peru, north of the larger Patagonian Desert, east of the Andes and west of the Sierra de Córdoba.

== Geography and climate ==
The delineations between the Monte Desert, the Atacama Desert, and the Patagonian Desert are not exact and the desert seems to be more-or-less continuous with the other two nearby deserts. The geography of the land is very similar to that of the interior Patagonian Desert, with volcanic sediments, piedmont plains, large mountain blocks and many usually dry salt lakes. The major river is the Río Colorado and its tributary the Río Desaguadero, which meet in the south of the region and provide its principal source of irrigation water for wine crops.

Due to the region lying on the eastern, or leeward, side of the Andes and west of the Sierra de Córdoba, it experiences very little rain. These rain shadow effects are the primary reason for the aridity of the region and the formation of the Monte and other nearby deserts. However, unlike the other two deserts, the Monte Desert does not experience an intense effect from the cold water currents off the South American coast. This allows the Monte Desert to support a wider variety of life than the other two more extreme deserts.

== Flora and fauna ==
The flora of the region is much more diverse than the nearby Patagonian Desert (which contains mainly shrubs and grasses) and the Atacama Desert (which is pretty much devoid of life). Shrubs and grasses are not only common, but tall cacti even appear in the more hospitable areas of the desert.

The fauna of the area is also very similar to that of the Patagonian Desert, only in greater diversity and number due to the Monte's more hospitable conditions. Small mammals like mice abound and larger animals like the guanaco and burrowing owl can be found as well.

The World Wildlife Fund has named one of their 'ecoregions' after this desert: NT0802.

== See also ==
- High Monte
- Argentine Monte
- Atacama Desert
- Patagonian Desert
- List of deserts
