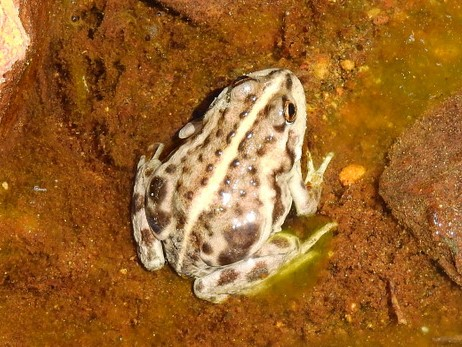

Conservation status
- Least Concern (IUCN 3.1)

Scientific classification
- Kingdom: Animalia
- Phylum: Chordata
- Class: Amphibia
- Order: Anura
- Family: Leptodactylidae
- Genus: Pleurodema
- Species: P. bufoninum

Binomial name
- Pleurodema bufoninum Bell, 1843

Synonyms
- Pleurodema bufonina

= Pleurodema bufoninum =

Species of amphibian

Pleurodema bufoninum, the large four-eyed frog, is a species of frog in the family Leptodactylidae. It is found in Argentina and Chile.

== Habitat ==
Its natural habitats are subantarctic forests, temperate forests, subantarctic shrubland, temperate shrubland, subtropical or tropical dry shrubland, subantarctic grassland, temperate grassland, intermittent rivers, swamps, intermittent freshwater marshes, arable land, rural gardens, ponds, and open excavations. The frog has been reported in protected areas. Scientists have seen it between 0 and 2,440 m (0 and 8,005 ft) above sea level.

== Etymology ==
The common name "four-eyed frog" refers to two inguinal poison glands that resemble eyes.

== Behavior ==
When threatened, the frog lowers its head and raises its rear. When the frog adopts this posture, the poison glands are also raised toward the predator. The predator may also confuse the frog's raised posterior for the head of a larger animal.
