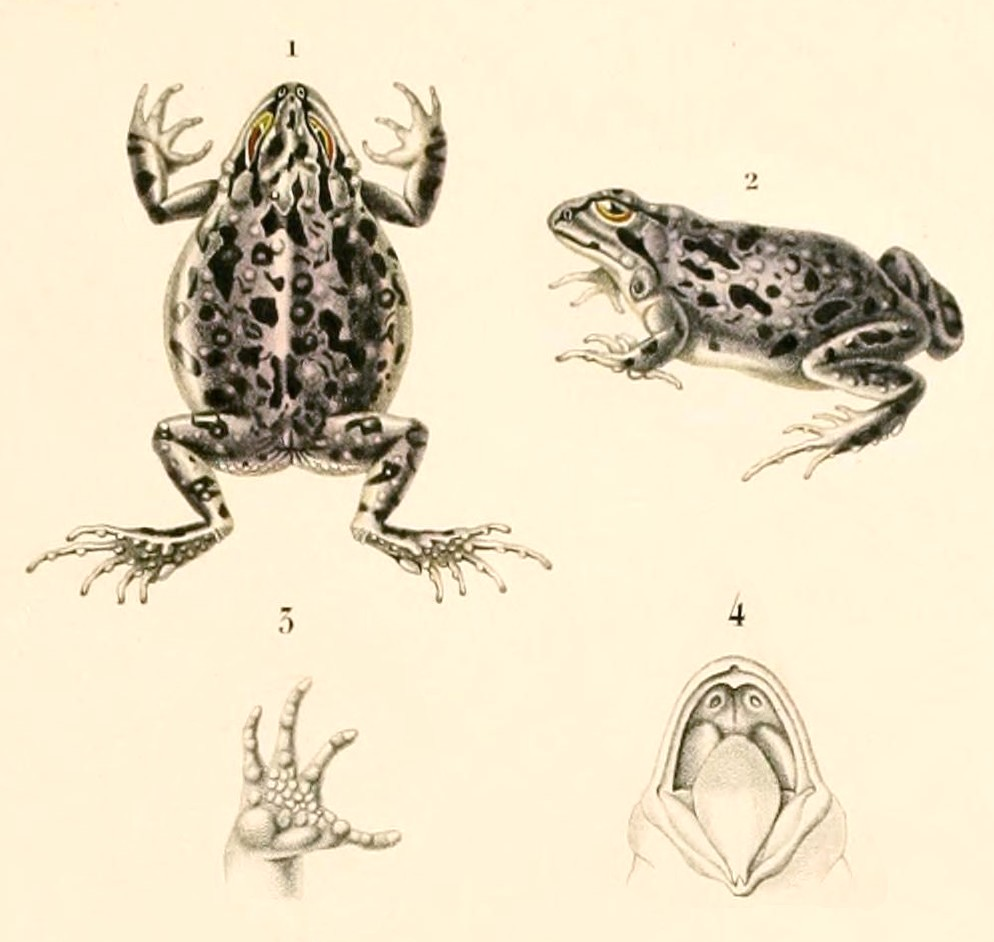

Conservation status
- Vulnerable (IUCN 3.1)

Scientific classification
- Kingdom: Animalia
- Phylum: Chordata
- Class: Amphibia
- Order: Anura
- Family: Leptodactylidae
- Genus: Pleurodema
- Species: P. marmoratum

Binomial name
- Pleurodema marmoratum (Dumeril & Bibron, 1841)

Synonyms
- Pleurodema marmorata (Duméril and Bibron, 1840); Chianopelas fuscus Tschudi, 1845; Chianopelas maculatus Tschudi, 1845; Leiuperus sagittifer Schimidt, 1857; Leiuperus viridis Tschudi, 1845; Pleurodema marmorata ssp. infuscata Vellard, 1960; Phrynopus spectabilis Duellman, 2000

= Pleurodema marmoratum =

Species of frog

Pleurodema marmoratum is a species of frog in the family Leptodactylidae. The species is endemic to South America.

== Reproduction ==
The adult male frog measures 27.9 mm in snout-vent length and the adult female frog 31.8 mm. The skin of the dorusm is tan and can have darker brown marks. The male frog's testes are very large for its body size and can take up one third of the body cavity.

== Geographic range ==
Pleurodema marmoratum is found in Argentina, Bolivia, Chile, and Peru.

== Taxonomy ==
Scientists used to consider this frog a subset of Phrynopus spectabilis. Spectabilis is Latin for "remarkable," a reference to its testes.

== Habitat ==
This frog is terrestrial. The natural habitats of Pleurodema marmoratum are subtropical or tropical high-altitude shrubland, subtropical or tropical high-altitude grassland, rivers, swamps, freshwater marshes, intermittent freshwater marshes, arable land, pastureland, and irrigated land, at altitudes of 3,000–5,200 m (9,800–17,100 ft).

Scientists have reported the frog in several protected places: Área Natural de Manejo Integrado Apolobamba, Reserva Nacional de Fauna Andina Eduardo Avaroa, Parque Nacional y Área Natural de Manejo Integrado Cotapata, Parque Nacionale Carrasco, Parque Nacionale Sajama, Reserva Nacional Salinas y Aguada Blanca, Reserva Nacional Pampa Galeras, Área de Conservación Regional Bosque de Puya Raimondi Titankayocc, Santuario Histórico de la Pampa de Ayacucho, Reserva de la Biósfera Laguna de Pozuelos, Parque Nacional Lauca, and Parque Nacional Isluga.

== Reproduction ==
This frog is an explosive breeder. The female frog deposits her eggs in ponds and streams with slow-moving water. People have also seen it in farmland with water on it.

== Danger ==
The IUCN classifies this frog as vulnerable of dying out. Threats include climate change and habitat loss. People set fires to convert the area to livestock pasturage. Scientists have found the fungus Batrachochytrium dendrobatidis on some of the frogs, but they have not confirmed whether chytridiomycosis kills the frog.
