= Pleurodema kriegi =

Conservation status
- Near Threatened (IUCN 3.1)

Scientific classification
- Kingdom: Animalia
- Phylum: Chordata
- Class: Amphibia
- Order: Anura
- Family: Leptodactylidae
- Genus: Pleurodema
- Species: P. kriegi

Binomial name
- Pleurodema kriegi (Müller, 1926)

Species of frog

Pleurodema kriegi is a species of frog in the family Leptodactylidae. It is endemic to Argentina.

== Home ==
This frog lives in grasslands on mountains and in nearby rocky areas. The adult frogs spend time under rocks and in burrows formerly dug by rodents. Scientists have observed it between 1,250 and 2,600 m (4,100 and 8,530 ft) above sea level.

Scientists have reported the frog in protected areas: Parque Nacional Quebrada del Condorito and Reserva Hídrica Provincial de Pampa de Achala.

== Reproduction ==
This frog breeds explosively after the rains begins to fall in November or December. The adult frogs egg masses that are semi-submerged or attached to water plants. This species breeds in temporary and permanent ponds and sometimes backwater areas within streams.

== Threats ==
The IUCN classifies this species as near threatened and the Argentina Red List classifies it as vulnerable. The large-scale protection of its habitat in the 1990s rendered its future more secure, but, before that, the area was subject to extensive cattle ranching. Scientists have reported the dangerous fungus Batrachochytrium dendrobatidis on some of these frogs, but it is not clear if the frogs suffer from chytridiomycosis.
