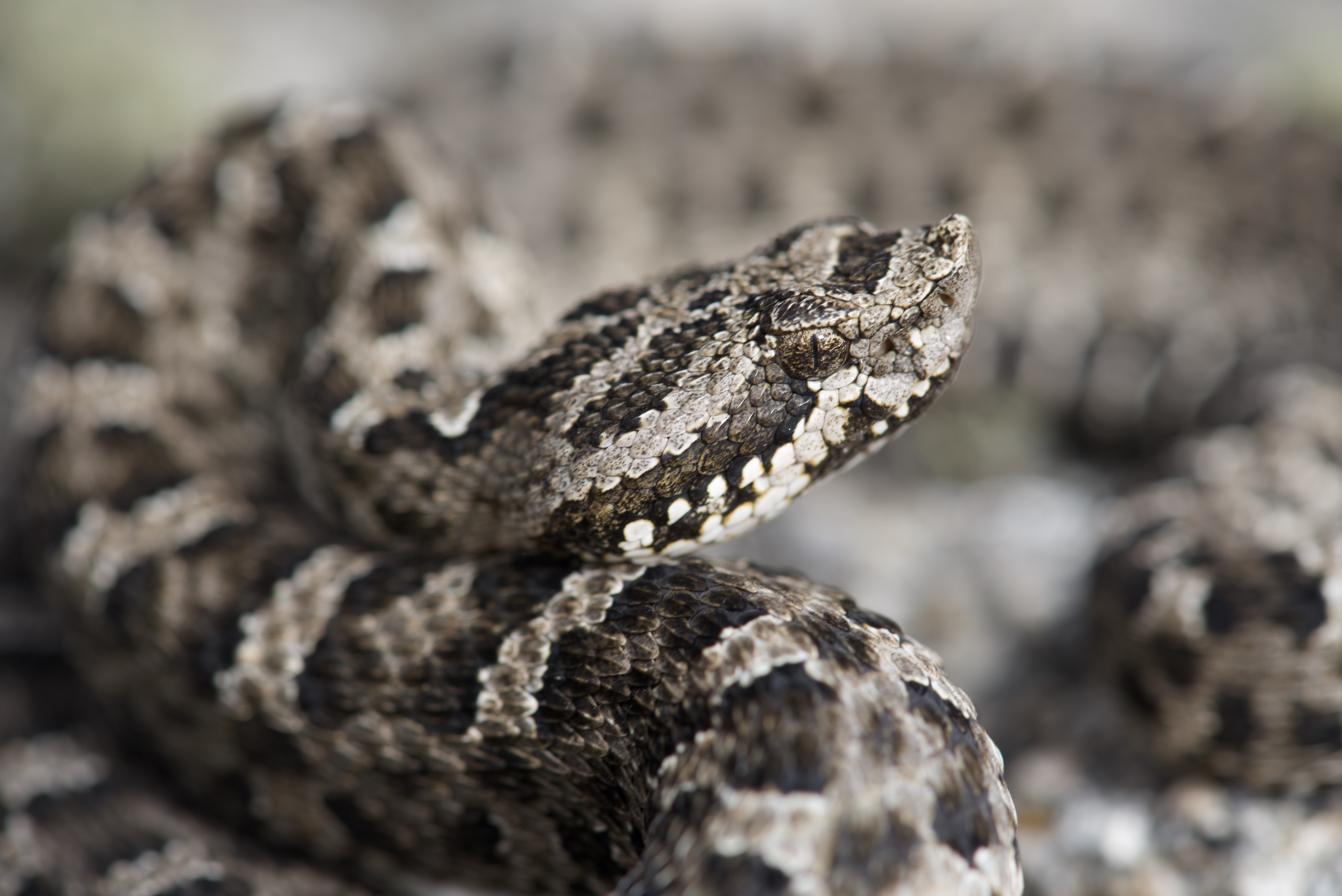
- Bothrops ammodytoides from the Sierra de Cordoba mountain range

Conservation status
- Least Concern (IUCN 3.1)

Scientific classification
- Kingdom: Animalia
- Phylum: Chordata
- Class: Reptilia
- Order: Squamata
- Suborder: Serpentes
- Family: Viperidae
- Genus: Bothrops
- Species: B. ammodytoides

Binomial name
- Bothrops ammodytoides Leybold, 1873

Synonyms
- Bothrops ammodytoides Leybold, 1873; Rhinocerophis nasus Garman, 1881; Bothrops nasus – Berg, 1884; Bothrops patagonicus F. Müller, 1885; Bothrops Burmeisteri Koslowsky, 1895; Lachesis ammodytoides – Boulenger, 1896; Bothrops ammodytoides – Amaral, 1930; Rhinocerophis ammodytoides – Fenwick et al., 2009

= Bothrops ammodytoides =

Species of snake

Common names: Patagonian lancehead, yarará ñata, Patagonian pit viper.

Bothrops ammodytoides is a pit viper species endemic to Argentina. No subspecies are currently recognized.

== Description ==
This species has a stocky build and grows to an average total length of 45–75 cm (18-30 inches), but is capable reaching almost 1 m (39 inches) in total length. The rostral scale is elongated vertically and the snout is upturned, similar to the hog-nosed pitvipers of the genus Porthidium.

Dorsally, it is pale brown, with a series of large squarish dark brown spots or crossbars which are edged with black. On some specimens these markings alternate to form a zigzag stripe. There is a dark streak behind the eye. Ventrally, it is yellowish with brown dots.

The very strongly keeled dorsal scales are arranged in 23 or 25 rows at midbody. Ventrals 149–160; anal plate entire; subcaudals 30–38, divided.

The dorsal surface of the head is covered by small, imbricate, keeled scales. The large supraoculars are separated by 8 or 9 rows of these small scales. Two rows of scales separate the eye from the upper labials. Upper labials 9 or 10, the 2nd separated from the loreal pit, the 3rd and 4th largest. The temporal scales are keeled.

== Common name ==
In Argentina is known as Yarará ñata (Spanish for "short-nosed yarará"), making reference to its characteristic snout.

== Geographic range ==
Found only in Argentina in the provinces of Buenos Aires, Catamarca, Córdoba, Chubut, La Pampa, La Rioja, Mendoza, Neuquén, Río Negro, San Juan, San Luis, Santa Cruz and Tucumán. The vertical distribution ranges from sea level to at least 2,000 m (6,600 ft) altitude. The type locality was first listed as "northern Argentina" and later emended to "province of Mendoza" Campbell and Lamar (1989).

The geographic range of Bothrops ammodytoides extends to 47° S Latitude, which may make it the world's southernmost snake.

== Habitat ==
Prefers dry regions, occurring in temperate to subtropical savannas and steppes. Found mostly in sandy, rocky areas, including coastal dunes, steep riverbanks and salt flats. Around the upper limits of its altitude range it can occasionally be found in broadleaf evergreen forest.

== Safety ==
Bothrops ammodytiodes venom is potentially lethal to humans, causing internal bleeding and tissue damage around the wound. The snakes are defensive of their territory and aggressive when disturbed.
