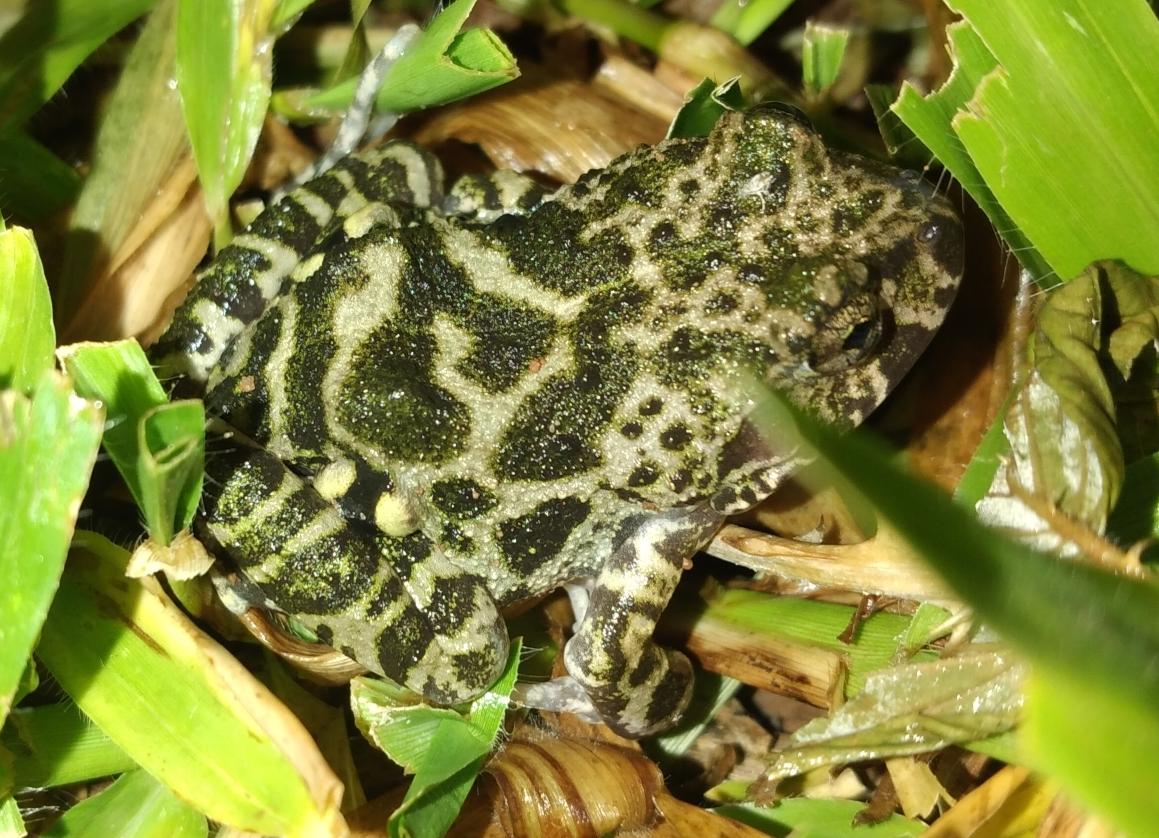

Conservation status
- Least Concern (IUCN 3.1)

Scientific classification
- Kingdom: Animalia
- Phylum: Chordata
- Class: Amphibia
- Order: Anura
- Family: Leptodactylidae
- Genus: Pleurodema
- Species: P. bibroni

Binomial name
- Pleurodema bibroni Tschudi, 1838

Synonyms
- Bombinator ocellatus Duméril & Bibron, 1841; Pleurodema darwinii Bell, 1843; Pleurodema granulosum Jiménez de la Espada, 1875

= Pleurodema bibroni =

Species of amphibian

Pleurodema bibroni is a species of frog in the family Leptodactylidae. Its common name is four-eyed frog, although this name can also refer to the genus Pleurodema in general.

== Description ==
The adult male frog measures 50 mm (2.0 in) in snout-vent length and the female frogs are larger. The skin of dorsum can be yellow, green, or dark green in color. The frogs have symmetrical brown spots. The belly is white in color.

== Etymology ==
The common name refers to two inguinal poison glands that resemble eyes. When threatened, the frog lowers its head and raises its rear. When the frog adopts this posture the poison glands are also raised toward the predator. The predator may also confuse the frog's raised posterior for the head of a larger animal.

== Habitat ==
Pleurodema bibroni is found in Uruguay and southern Brazil. Its natural habitats are coastal sand plains, open savannas, rocky outcrops, grasslands and open montane habitats between 0 and 900 metres (0 and 2,950 ft) above sea level. This frog lives in Nothofagus forest habitats. It can also live in savanna, sand plains, rocky places, and mountainous areas. People have seen adult frogs near animal pasture. Scientists have seen it between 0 and 1,100 m (0 and 3,610 ft) above sea level.

Scientists have seen the frog in protected places: Floresta Nacional de São Francisco de Paula, Área de Recursos Manejados Humedales de Santa Lucía, Área de Manejo de Hábitats y/o Especies de Cerro Verde e Islas de la Coronilla, Paisaje Protegido Laguna de Rocha, and Parque Nacional Cabo Polonio.

== Diet ==
This frog eats arthropods, such as arachnids and dipterids. They also eat some plants.

== Reproduction ==
These frogs have young in temporary ponds via larval development.

== Threats ==
The IUCN classifies this frog as least concern of extinction and the governments of Brazil and Paraguay classify it as data deficient. It is suspected that the urbanization of some coastal areas is responsible in part for the decline of the species. The principal threat is habitat loss associated with agriculture and urbanization. Scientists have found the dangerous fungus Batrachochytrium dendrobatidis near where the frogs once lived, but it has not been established whether chytridiomycosis kills the frog.
