= San Guillermo National Park =

National park in Argentina

- Parque Nacional San Guillermo
- IUCN category II (national park)
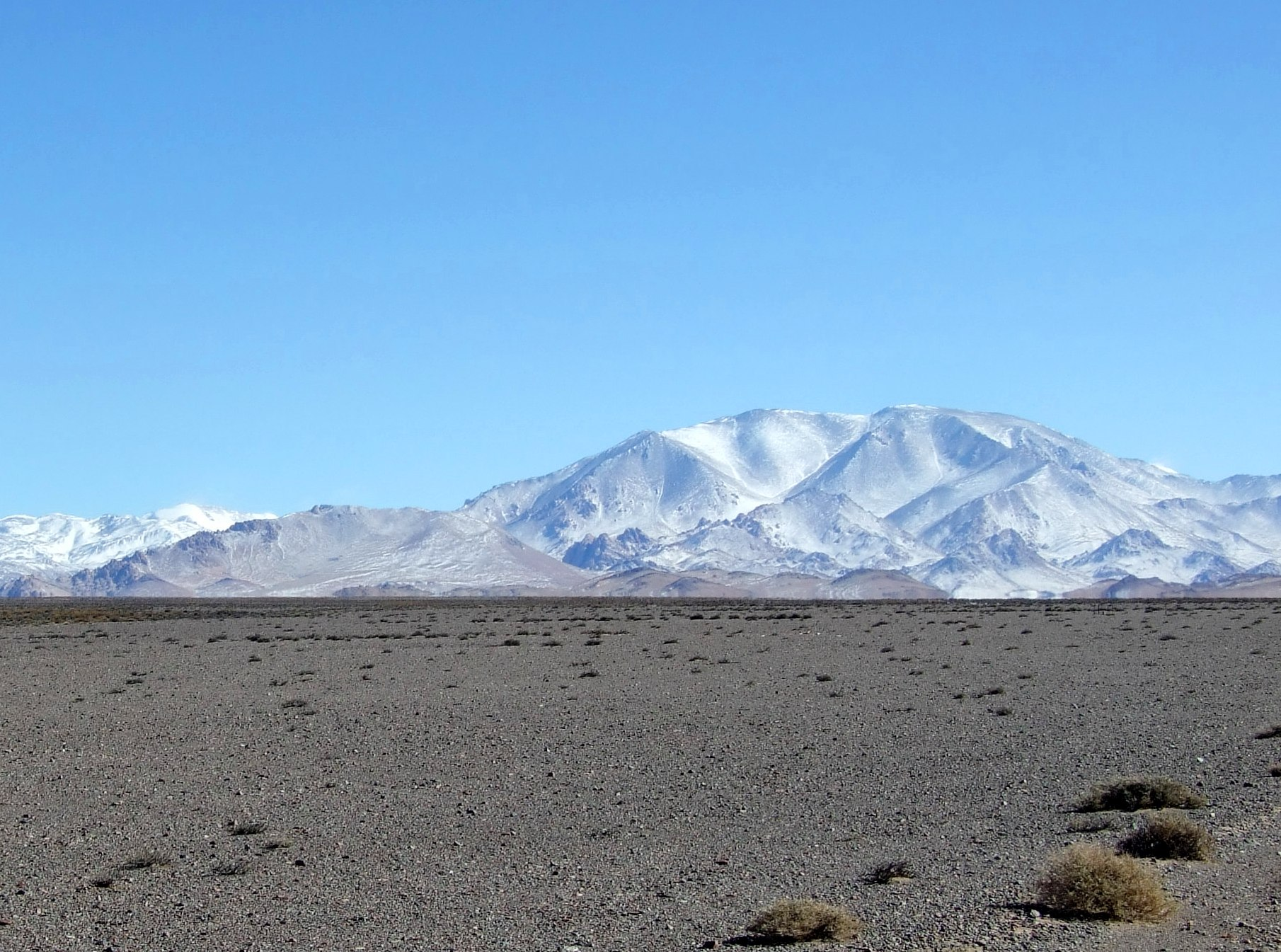

- Location within Argentina
- Location: Iglesia Department, San Juan Province, Argentina
- Coordinates: 29.4167°S 69.25°W
- Area: 166,000 hectares (640 sq mi)
- Established: 1998

San Guillermo National Park (Spanish: Parque Nacional San Guillermo) is a national park in Argentina, in the Iglesia Department of San Juan Province. It was established in 1998 and is part of the San Guillermo Biosphere Reserve. Elevations in the biosphere range from 2,100 metres (6,900 ft) to 6,380 metres (20,930 ft). Vegetation in the National Park and biosphere consists of barren desert, grasslands, and a few wetlands, all located in the high, arid Andes. The animals include vicuña, guanaco, culpeo fox, Andean mountain cat, cougar, and Andean condor.

== The park ==
The San Guillermo National Park is located in the northern part of San Juan Province, Argentina near the town of Rodeo. The park was established on January 13, 1999. It has an area of 166,000 hectares in the high Andes, and includes puna grassland and mountain summits. It was originally set up as a provincial reserve in 1972 and became the San Guillermo Biosphere Reserve in 1980. Its main objective is to preserve the natural habitat of vicuñas, and at the same time protect the other plants and animals of this mountain area.

== Ecology ==
The biosphere has an area of 981,000 hectares (2,420,000 acres). The core area is the National Park and consists of arid mountain ranges with no permanent water courses. The soils are mostly rocky and coarse, but some areas with favorable conditions, mostly above 3,500 m (11,483 ft), support steppe grassland. The flora consists of scattered dwarf shrubs, interspersed with coarse grasses and herbaceous plants, and much bare ground. The shrubs include Adesmia, Parastrephia, Fabiana, Azorella and Ephedra (plant). Grasses present include Stipa, Calamagrostis and Festuca and flowering plants include Astragalus, Tropaeolum, Phacelia and Glandularia.

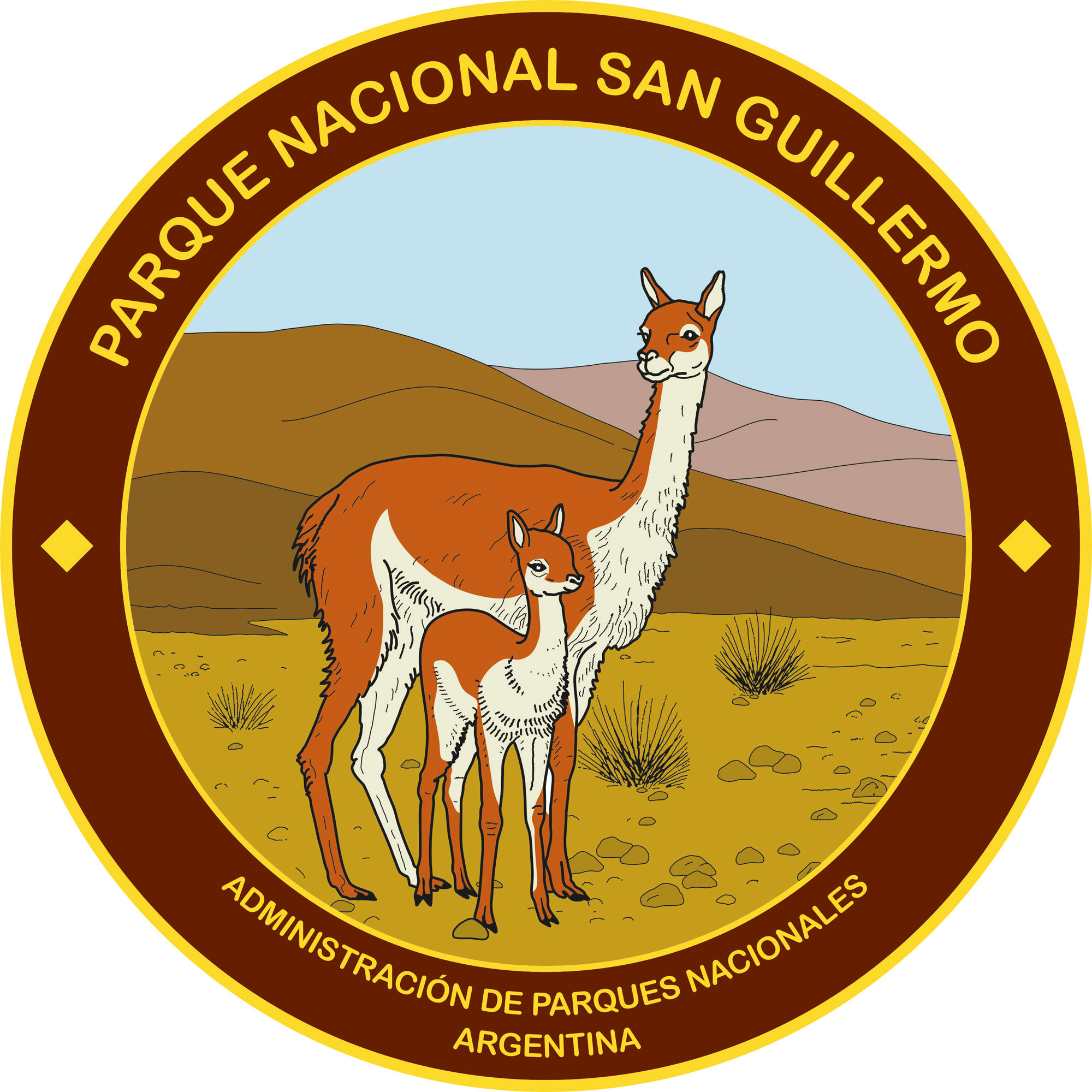
Park logo featuring vicuñas

The main reason for setting up the biosphere reserve was to protect vicuñas. Also present in the reserve are the guanaco, the culpeo fox, the Andean mountain cat, the cougar, the southern viscacha, the short-tailed chinchilla, the Darwin's rhea, various ducks and geese, and the Andean condor.

== Research ==
A research project involves fitting cougars, the top predator in the park, with GPS radio collars and tracking their movements. Simultaneously vicuñas, one of their main prey animals, are being fitted with collars to monitor their behaviour. It has been found that in areas of the park with plenty of cover, such as canyons and wetlands, the vicuñas are much more alert to danger and consequently spend less time feeding than they do on open plains. This alters the composition of the plant species present with a resulting increase in invertebrates and in biodiversity. There are plans to fit some condors with collars to find out to what extent they benefit from an increase in the frequency of vicuña kills.
