= Sierra de las Quijadas National Park =

National park in San Luis, Argentina

- Parque Nacional Sierra de las Quijadas
- IUCN category II (national park)
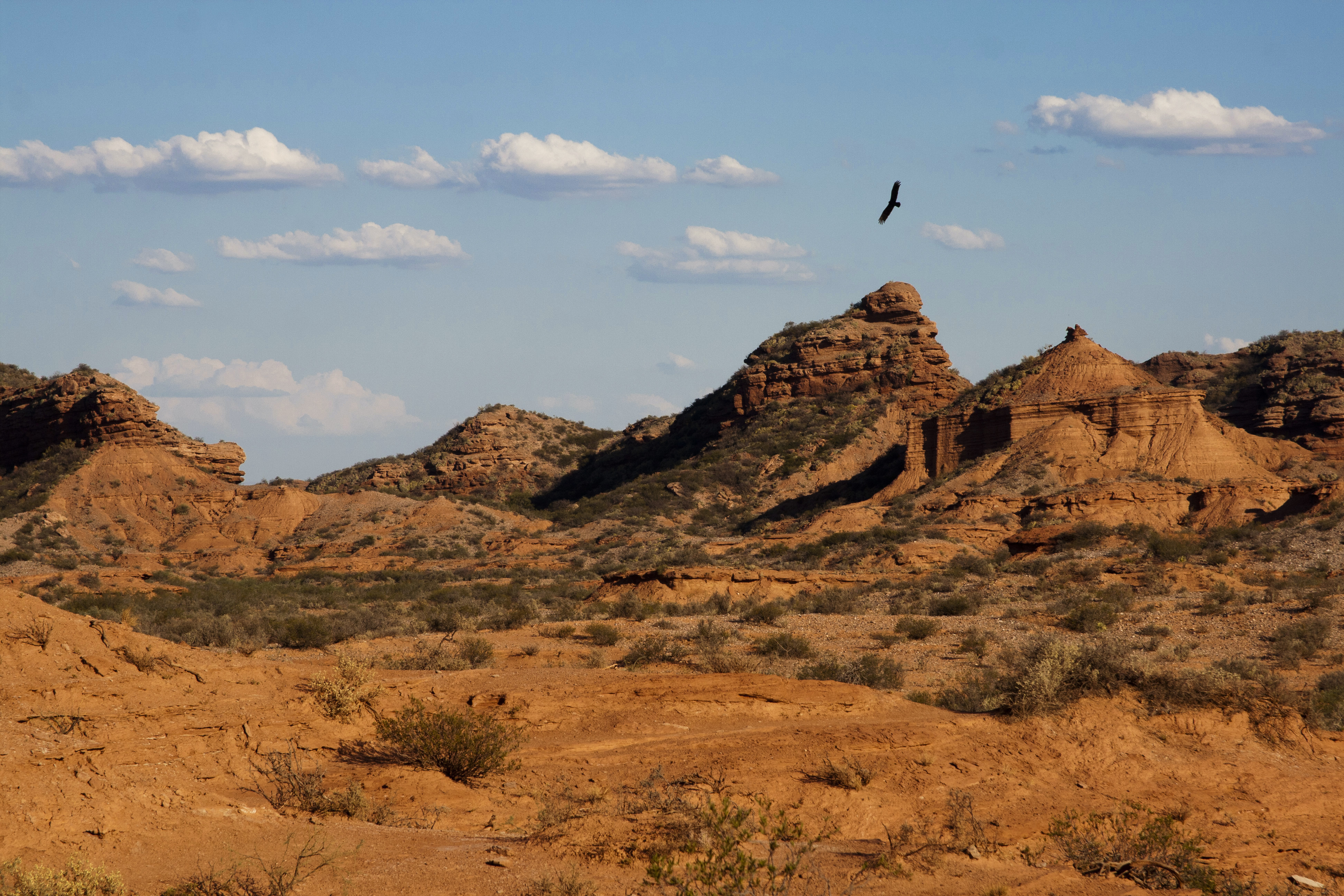

- Location within Argentina
- Location: San Luis Province, Argentina
- Coordinates: 32°33′03″S 67°03′51″W
- Area: 73,533 ha (181,700 acres)
- Established: 1991
- Governing body: Administración de Parques Nacionales
- Website: Parque Nacional Sierra de las Quijadas

The Sierra de las Quijadas National Park (Spanish: Parque Nacional Sierra de las Quijadas) is a national park located in the northwestern part of the Argentine province of San Luis. It was established on December 10, 1991, to protect the natural features, representative of the Semiarid Chaco and the High Monte ecoregions.

== Climate ==
In San Luis, the ecotone between the mountains and the Chaco is located west of the 400 mm (16 in) isohyet and covers about 800,000 ha (2,000,000 acres). The climate of the area is semi-arid and is characterized by sharp temperature variations, both seasonal and daily. The average annual maximum temperature is 24.4 °C (76 °F), while the minimum is 10.7 °C (51 °F). The annual average temperature is 13.7 °C (57 °F). The maximum monthly average temperature is 31 °C (88 °F), for the month of January. The minimum is 3.1 °C (38 °F), for the month of July. The average value of relative humidity varies between 48% in August–September to 64% in April–June; the annual average is 55%. Precipitation is scarce and unevenly distributed throughout the year. There are two seasons: dry during winter and wet from late spring to early autumn.

== Geology ==
Sierra de las Quijadas is located in the San Luis Basin, whose surface is composed of sedimentary, metamorphic, and igneous outcrops of various ages. The basin is bounded by the Sierra de San Luis to the east, while to the west the basin is presumed to be subsurficially connected to the Triassic basins of the Mendoza and San Juan provinces. To the north, the basin extends to Marayes de San Juan. It is an anticlinal structure, of roughly elliptical shape whose major axis is oriented meridionally. A large fracture extends in the north–south direction, subparallel to the current course of the Desaguadero River. Along this fracture, the Quijadas range has been lifted.

=== Geologic origin ===
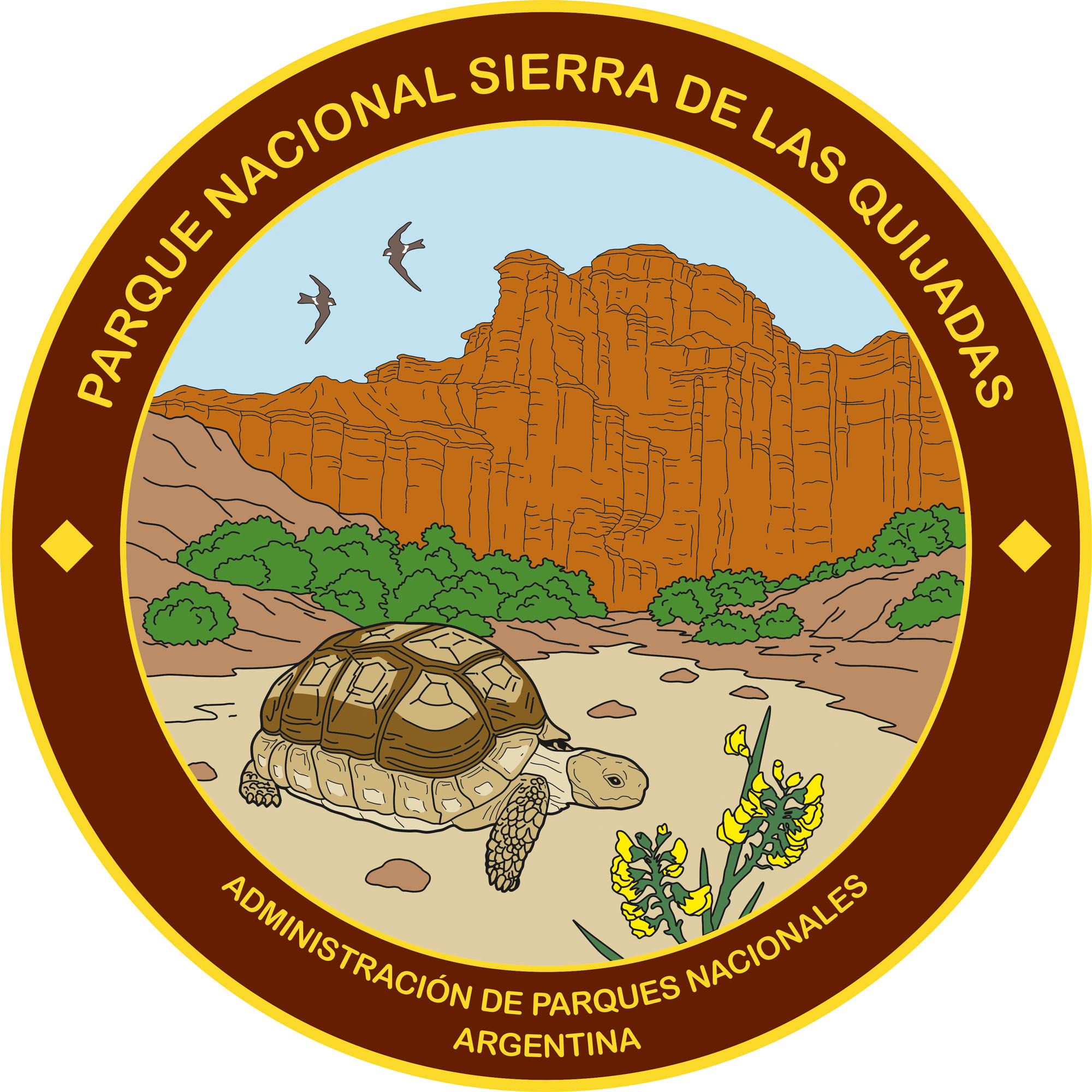
Park logo

The geologic origin of the Quijadas is composed of three stages: infill, uplift and erosion. 120 mya, the present location of the Quijadas was occupied by a sedimentary basin, flanked by two highlands. One of them is the Sierras de San Luis. Another is a range that had existed along the current course of the Desaguadero River. The basins began to be filled with fluvial and aeolian sediments, eroded from the highlands. The process lasted some 20 Ma, which resulted in the basin being completely filled 100 mya. The following 75 Ma are missing from the geologic record and are assumed to be a period of calm. During the Tertiary, the layers that had been deposited 120–100 mya were raised and folded by the tectonic processes associated with the formation of Sierras Pampeanas. The uplift began 25 mya, and the Quijadas still rise, as the South American Plate continues its westward migration. Concurrently with the uplift, erosion became a major factor, which created the modern valleys and ravines, such as the Potrero de la Aguada valley.

=== Geologic formations ===
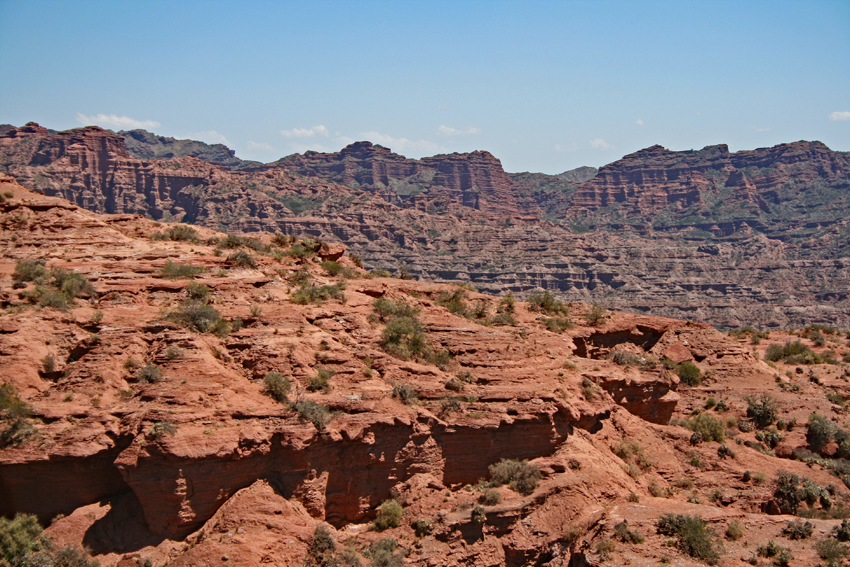
Sierra de las Quijadas rock formations

Within the park's boundaries, five geologic formations of Lower Cretaceous age, as well as one of Tertiary, have been identified. The Cretaceous layers relate to the 20 Ma basin infilling stage, which accumulated more than 1000 m of sediments. Subsequent uplift, folding and erosion allowed these formations to be currently exposed at the surface. El Jume Formation is the oldest of the sequence, having been formed 120 mya. It outcrops in the Potrero de la Aguada valley. Some 300 m thick, its depositional environments varied from fluvial to aeolian to lacustrine. Lithologically, the formation is composed of alternating layers of red sandstone and claystone. El Toscal and La Cruz formations are widely distributed within the Quijadas. Deposited 110 mya, the formations contribute to the bulk of the area's relief, formin reddish, whitish and gray cliffs and gorges. The rocks originate in the high-energy fluvial environments, associated with rivers that once flowed from the ancient Sierra del Desaguadero mountains. La Cruz formation contains a layer of basaltic lava, which erupted 109.4–107.4 mya. The formations are made up of layers of conglomerate, sandstone, claystone and gypsum and are partly covered by modern fill. Lagarcito Formation, deposited around 100 mya, is found at the eastern slopes of the mountains, gradually diving into the surrounding plain. The formation is dominated by claystones, with some sandstones, that were deposited into a system of interconnected lakes. The San Roque is the most recent formation, deposited 25 mya. Together with the Lagarcito Formation, it forms a series of low rising hills throughout the park. It consists of layers of conglomerate, sandstone, claystone and gypsum, partly covered with modern fill. Undifferentiated Quaternary deposits consist of rocks as well as sediments. The latter are mainly fluvial sands and aeolian silts, typical of the Pampeano loess. The age of these layers does not exceed 1 Ma. The youngest deposits (Pleistocene–Holocene) are found in the flood plains and in the Lagunas de Guanacache wetlands. They are alluvial and lacustrine in origin, with some salt flats as well.

=== Paleontology ===
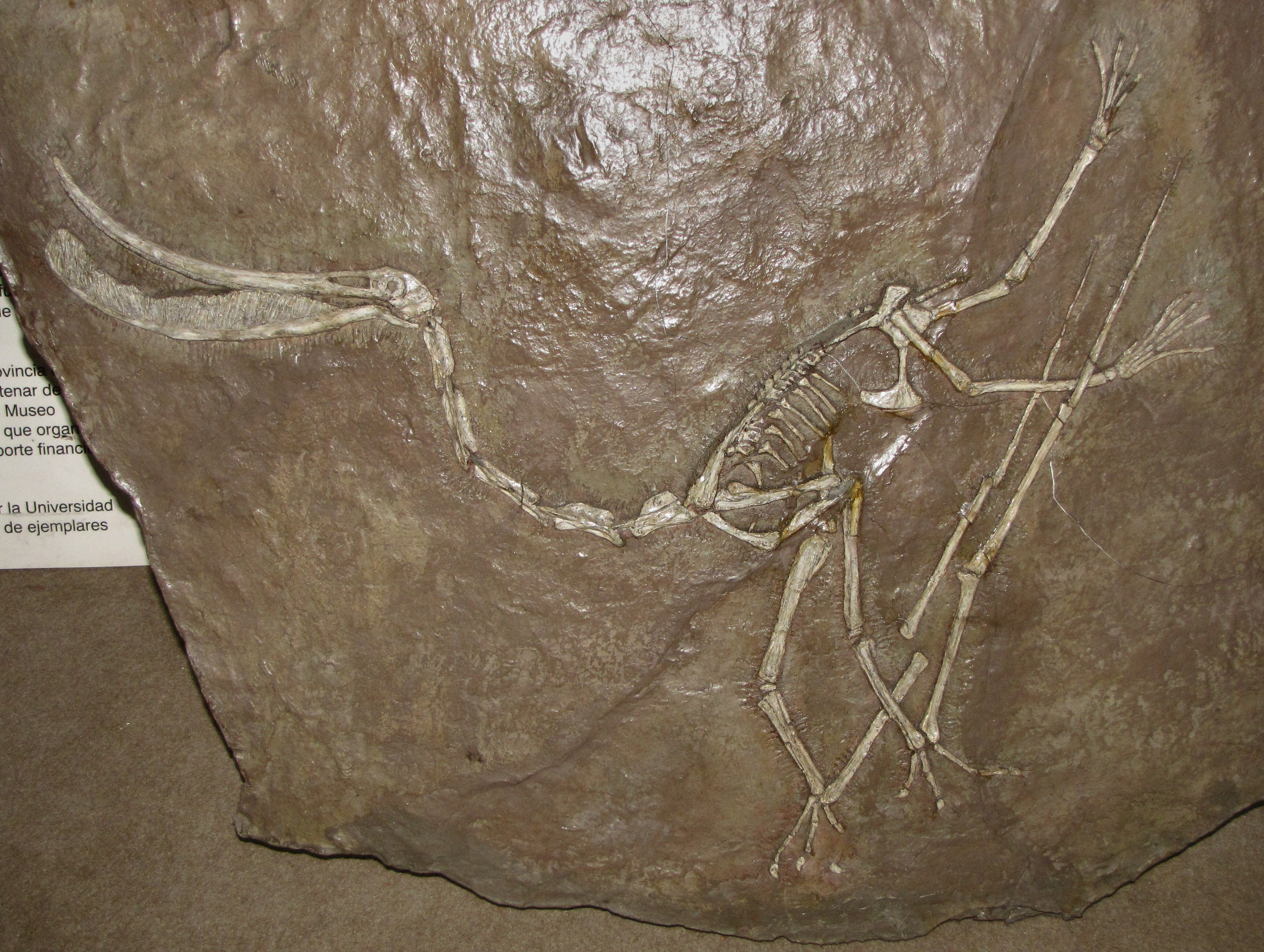
Cast of a P. guinazui specimen discovered in the park at the Museo Argentino de Ciencias Naturales in Caballito, Buenos Aires, Argentina.

During the 1960s–1970s, remains of Pterodaustro guinazui were discovered for the first time in the Lagarcito Formation by José Bonaparte. Since then, the fossil site, named Loma del Pterodaustro during the 1990s, has been extensively quarried, providing abundant fossil plant and animal remains, mainly pterosaurs; due to the fine preservation of delicate structures, the site has been classified as a Konservat-Lagerstätte.

== Hydrography ==
The park has a very pronounced drainage network, generated by stormwater runoff affecting the area, so the surface rocks are very susceptible to erosion. However, all streams are ephemeral, carrying water only during the wet season. The Potrero de la Aguada valley is a special case, as it concentrates rainwater in an enclosed structure and discharges it via a single outlet, Arroyo de la Aguada, which empties into the Desaguadero River.

The Lagunas de Guanacache is historically one of the largest wetlands in the Cuyo; it's located on the border of the provinces of Mendoza, San Juan and San Luis, approximately 80 km northeast of the city of Mendoza. The system was part of a larger wetland complex, fed by the Mendoza and San Juan rivers, which included lakes La Balsita, Grande, Del Toro, Silverio, Del Rosario, El Porvenir, among others. These marsh waters discharged into the Desaguadero River, contributing to its perennial flow. The complex can be divided into three sectors.

== Topography ==
The variation of elevation is mainly between 500 and 900 mamsl. The Desaguadero River valley is below 500 m, while some peaks are above 900 m: Cerro El Portillo and Cerro El Lindo are below 1090 m, Cerro Los Viejos is 920 m Cerros de la Aguada and Cerros de la Vidriera approach 850 m. The whole area is divided into 6 physiographic units: the Desaguadero River flood plain, the Arroyo de la Aguada circular valley, steppe, foothills, and slopes and summits. The shaping of the landscape in the region is mainly due to the erosion caused by water from occasional rains and erosion by wind.

== Biodiversity ==
Sierra de las Quijadas is the only protected area in the Chaco – Monte ecotone, preserving flora and fauna of the San Luis Province.

=== Flora ===
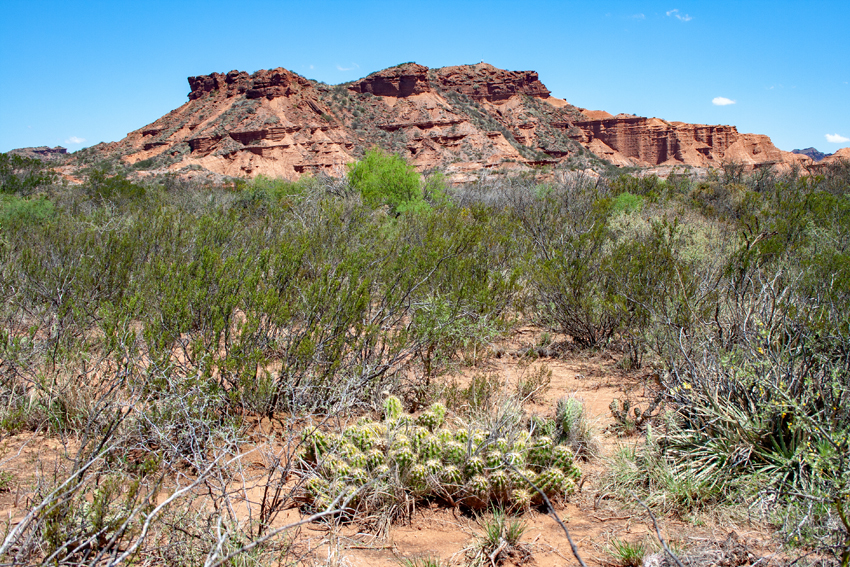
Tamarisk and cactus in the Sierra de las Quijadas national park

Within the park, 416 species have been identified, including 17 that are introduced, of which the French tamarisk is the most prominent, forming dense stands along the stream banks. Two species, Senecio hualtaranensis and Atriplex quixadensis are endemic to the park.

=== Fauna ===
The location of the national park in the Chaco – Monte ecotones entails the presence of representative species of both biomes. Chaco species such as the gray brocket, Chacoan mara, blue-crowned parakeet and Argentine boa coexist with characteristic species of the Monte, such as the pink fairy armadillo, sandy gallito and Darwin's tree iguana, among others. About 270 vertebrate species are found in the park, including 4 introduced.
