= Kirchner =

Kirchner is an occupational surname of German origin, derived from the Middle High German word kirchenaere ('sexton', 'priest', 'church assistant' or 'church property administrator'). Notable people with the name include:

== Arts ==
- Alfred Kirchner (born 1937), German actor, theatre director, opera director, theatre manager
- Athanasius Kircher, a/k/a Athanasius Kirchner (1602–1680), German Jesuit scholar and polymath
- Claude Kirchner (1916–1993), American television announcer and children's personality
- Emma Kirchner (1830–1909), German photographer who lived and worked in the Netherlands.
- Ernst Ludwig Kirchner (1880–1938), German Expressionist artist
- Ignaz Kirchner (1946–2018), German actor
- Jaime Lee Kirchner (1981), American actress
- Leon Kirchner (1919–2009), American composer
- Marilena Kirchner (1997), German volksmusik and schlager singer
- Paul Kirchner (1952), American illustrator and comic-book author
- Raphael Kirchner (1876–1917), Austrian artist and illustrator
- Shabier Kirchner (born 1987/1988), Antiguan cinematographer and filmmaker
- Theodor Kirchner (1823–1903), German composer
- Volker David Kirchner (1942–2020), German violist and composer
- Zuzana Kirchnerová (born 1978), Czech film director

== Politics ==
- Alicia Kirchner (born 1946), Argentine politician
- Cristina Fernández de Kirchner (born 1953), former President and Vice-President of Argentina
- Máximo Kirchner (born 1977), Argentine politician
- Néstor Kirchner (1950–2010), former President of Argentina
- Oliver Kirchner (born 1966), German politician
- Russ Kirchner Jr., American businessman
- William G. Kirchner (1916–1999), American politician and businessman

== Sports ==
- Albert Edward Lester "Alby" Kirchner (1888–1942), Australian rules footballer
- Andreas Kirchner (1953–2010), German hammer thrower and bob pusher
- H. E. Kirchner (1937–1993), American basketball player
- Mark Kirchner (1970), German biathlete
- Michael Kirchner or Corporal Kirchner (1957–2021), American professional wrestler
- Zane Kirchner (1984), South African rugby player

== Other ==
- 16441 Kirchner, asteroid discovered in 1989
- Friedrich Kirchner (1885–1960), German General during the Second World War
- James Kirchner, University of California professor
- Johanna Kirchner (1889–1944), anti-Nazi dissident
- Johannes Kirchner (1859-1940), German epigrapher
- Kirchner's viscacha rat, species of rodents in the family Octodontidae described in 2014, one of two species in the genus Tympanoctomys
- Kirchner Cultural Centre, cultural centre located in Buenos Aires, Argentina
- Kirchneriella, genus of green algae in the family Selenastraceae
- Kirchner Peak, isolated peak in Antarctica
- Kirchnerism, Argentine political movement
- Kirchner v. Venus (1859), English Law case precedent that defined freight as "the reward payable to the carrier of for the safe carriage and delivery of goods"
- Oskar von Kirchner (1851–1925), German botanist and agronomist
