= HP Alloys =

- Industry: Alloy
- Founded: 1984; 41 years ago
- Founder: Russ Kirchner Jr.
- Headquarters: Tipton, Indiana, United States
- Area served: United States
- Website: hpalloys.com

HP Alloys is an American manufacturer and distributor of alloys, based in Tipton, Indiana. Founded in 1984 by Russ Kirchner Jr., the company is currently owned by two of his sons, Dave, and Russ, who purchased it in 2010.

== History ==
HP Alloys was established by metallurgist Russ Kirchner in 1984.

During the late 1980s, the company's operations extended to include the production of materials such as plate, sheet, bars, and forgings, adding manufacturing capabilities to its business.

In 2009, HP Alloys relocated its distribution of plate, sheet, and weld wire to Windfall, Indiana. In the same year, Cella and Russ Kirchner took retirement.

In May 2014, HP Alloys was featured in an episode of the National Geographic television program Showdown of the Unbeatables.

HP Alloys received recognition from the Indiana Economic Development Corporation in 2011 when it was included in the Indiana Companies to Watch list. In 2021, the company was recognized as the Rural Small Business of the Year by the Indiana Economic Development Corp. and Inside Indiana Business.

== Manufacturing ==
The company operates two facilities: a manufacturing plant in Tipton and its headquarters in Windfall, Indiana. The Tipton facility uses a hot-and-cold process to create metal alloys, while the Windfall facility incorporates a cutting technique using water and powder-fine garnet for abrasion.

High Performance Alloys' alloys have been used in multiple NASA projects, including the Mars rover, Space Station Freedom, and Space Shuttle. The alloys have also been used in fighter aircraft, rockets, Ferrari Formula One cars, and yacht rigging for America's Cup competitors. The company is currently a supplier for a joint fighter project of the U.S. Department of Defense and serves companies in Fort Wayne, Indianapolis, and around the Crane Naval Air Station.

== Division ==
- Hoosier WaterJet
