= Iobakchoi =

The (Society of the) Iobakchoi (or Iobacchoi) was a second to third century CE Athenian cult association devoted to Dionysus (Bacchus), known from the Iobakchoi inscription (IG, II2, 1368, Athens, 164/165 CE; AGRW ID# 496).
