= Johannes Kirchner =

Johannes Ernst Kirchner (25 September [O.S. 13 September] 1859-27 June 1940) was a German classical philologist and epigrapher.

== Life ==
Johannes Kirchner was born in Reval (modern Tallinn, Estonia), then part of the Russian Empire and grew up in Saint Petersburg, where his father ran a school. From 1874, he attended Pforta school in Saxony-Anhalt. In 1880, he began studies in classical philology and history at Halle and Bonn under Hermann Usener and Franz Bücheler. He graduated in 1883 at Halle with a work on Demosthenes. During his studies, he was a member of the Academic-Musical Association of Ascania Halle (part of the Sondershäuser Verband. From 1884 until his retirement in 1924, he was a teacher at the Friedrich Wilhelm Gymnasium in Berlin. Alongside that, he also taught Greek style at Humboldt University of Berlin from 1905 to 1925.

In addition to his educational work, Kirchner carried out research in the areas of Ancient Athenian epigraphy and prosopography. His name is particularly associated with two great projects: the Prosopographia Attica (a collection of 16,000 short biographies of Athenians, mainly based on epigraphic evidence) and the second edition of Inscriptiones graecae II/III, a corpus of Athenian inscriptions from after 403/2 BC, much of which is still the standard reference work.

He was honoured with the Goethe-Medaille für Kunst und Wissenschaft in 1939.

The librarian Joachim Kirchner was his son.

== Writings ==
- Prosopographia Attica. 2 Vols. Reimer, Berlin 1901–1903. Nachdrucke: de Gruyter, Berlin 1966; Ares, Chicago 1981, ISBN 0-89005-387-1.
- Inscriptiones Atticae Euclidis anno posteriores. 4 volumes, 7 fascicles. Reimer, Berlin 1913–1940. Nachdrucke: Ares Publishers, Chicago 1974; de Gruyter, Berlin 1977.
- Imagines inscriptionum Atticarum. Ein Bilderatlas epigraphischer Denkmäler Attikas. Mann, Berlin 1935. 2nd edition, revised by Günther Klaffenbach. Mann, Berlin 1948.

== Bibliography ==
- Hellmut Rosenfeld (1977). "Kirchner, Johannes". Neue Deutsche Biographie (in German). Vol. 11. Berlin: Duncker & Humblot. pp. 662–663. (full text online).
- Friedrich Hiller von Gaertringen: "Johannes Kirchner." Jahresbericht über die Fortschritte der Klassischen Altertumswissenschaft. Bd. 280. Vandenhoeck & Ruprecht, Göttingen 1942.
