= Chalchalero viscacha rat =

Conservation status
- Critically Endangered (IUCN 3.1)

Scientific classification
- Kingdom: Animalia
- Phylum: Chordata
- Class: Mammalia
- Order: Rodentia
- Family: Octodontidae
- Genus: Tympanoctomys
- Species: T. loschalchalerosorum

Binomial name
- Tympanoctomys loschalchalerosorum Mares, Braun, Barquez & Diaz, 2000
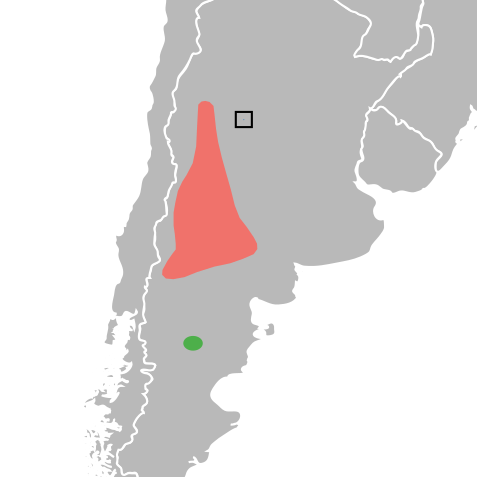
- Tympanoctomys distribution T. loschalchalerosorum in blue (in box)

Synonyms
- Salinoctomys loschalchalerosorum

Species of rodent

The Chalchalero viscacha rat or Chalchalero vizcacha rat (Tympanoctomys loschalchalerosorum) is a species of caviomorph rodent in the family Octodontidae. It was formerly considered to be monotypic within the genus Salinoctomys, but has been shown by genetic analysis to nest within Tympanoctomys, and in particular, within the variation of T. barrerae. The species is endemic to a small area of northwestern Argentina, where it lives in shrublands bordering the salt flats of the Salinas Grandes. Its diet consists of halophyte plants. It is named after an Argentine musical group, Los Chalchaleros, whose songs were popular with its discoverers.

== Description ==
The Chalchalero viscacha rat is a nocturnal medium-sized species of rat. Its dorsal fur is dark brownish black while its underparts are white. The hairs on its back are about 2 centimetres (0.8 in) long and have a grey base, a brown band and a black tip, and the guard hairs are a uniform darkish brown. This viscacha rat reaches a head-and-body length of 14 to 16 centimetres (5.5 to 6.3 in) with a tail length of 11 to 12 centimetres (4.3 to 4.7 in). The tail is relatively long, clad with hair along its entire length and ends with a black tassel. The soles of the feet have six pads, and there is a fringe of hairs around the feet.

== Status ==
It is only found within an area totalling less than 100 square kilometres (39 mi^{2}) and it actually occupies only about one tenth of that area. It lives among the salt-loving plants that grow between the salt pans and the dense thorn scrub typical of the surrounding area. Its population is decreasing and the International Union for Conservation of Nature has rated its conservation status as "critically endangered".
