= Kirchler =

Kirchler is a surname. Notable people with the surname include:

- Elisabeth Kirchler (born 1963), Austrian skier
- Erich Kirchler (born 1954), Italian-Austrian psychologist
- Hannes Kirchler (born 1978), Italian discus thrower
- Roland Kirchler (born 1970), Austrian football player

== See also ==
- Kirchner
