= Sepher Ha-Razim: The Book of Mysteries =

Sepher Ha-Razim: The Book of Mysteries is a book written by Michael A. Morgan.

== Contents ==
Sefer HaRazim is a book in which the early Hebrew magical text Sefer HaRazim dates back to around 300 A.D. It was reconstructed from multiple Hebrew manuscripts and later translated into Arabic and Latin, significantly influencing medieval magical traditions. The text describes a cosmological journey through seven heavens, listing powerful angels associated with different aspects of the world, such as healing, warfare, divination, love, wealth, and summoning spirits. The book provides detailed ceremonies and incantations for invoking angels and compelling them to perform magical acts. Rituals range from curing illnesses and interpreting dreams to controlling animals and summoning spirits of the dead. The Sepher HaRazim was believed to have been revealed to Noah by the angel Raziel and eventually passed to King Solomon, who used its knowledge to command demons. The work is considered an important resource for understanding medieval magic.

== Reception ==
William Hamblin reviewed Sepher Ha-Razim: The Book of Mysteries for Different Worlds magazine and stated that "Too often magic is thought of simply as something that can be turned on and off like a light switch, while even a brief reading of the Sepher HaRazim shows that medieval man saw magic as a complex activity requiring extensive spiritual preparations, the proper magic implements, complex ceremonies, and a knowledge of the secret names of power."

== See also ==
- Ancient Jewish magic
