= Ancient Jewish magic =

Magical practices employed in ancient Israel and early Judaism

Ancient Jewish magic refers to a range of magical practices and techniques employed by Jews from the Second Temple period through the Rabbinic period. These practices are known through both textual and material evidence, including magical papyri, inscriptions, amulets, and incantation bowls, which illuminate aspects of popular religion that are only partially reflected in normative rabbinic literature. Ancient Jewish magic was closely connected to Jewish mysticism and it functioned alongside emerging rabbinic traditions rather than entirely outside them.

The evidence for ancient Jewish magic comes chiefly from the Land of Israel (Judaea/Palaestina) and Mesopotamia (or in Jewish terms, Babylonia). Magical texts appear in multiple languages used by Jewish communities, including Hebrew, Aramaic, and Greek, and were written on diverse media such as papyrus, metal sheets, ceramic sherds, stone, and clay bowls. These texts were typically produced for specific individuals and addressed practical concerns such as protection from demons, healing, success, love, and the binding of enemies. While some Jewish magical texts exhibit elements shared with surrounding cultures, many employ distinctly Jewish features, such as the invocation of biblical verses, angels, and multiple names of God.

The study of ancient Jewish magic has become an important field of research for understanding Jewish religious life beyond elite or legal texts. Since the late 19th century, archaeological discoveries and scholarly analysis have integrated magical papyri and inscriptions into broader reconstructions of Judaism in antiquity, complementing sources such as the Hebrew Bible, Apocrypha, Pseudepigrapha, Dead Sea Scrolls, works of Josephus and Philo, the New Testament, the Mishnah, and the Talmud. Together, these materials point to a long-lived and adaptable magical tradition that continued into the medieval period, preserving similar formulas and media.

== Overview ==
Although magic was forbidden by Law in the Hebrew Bible, magic relates to Jewish mysticism, and Gideon Bohak believes magical "technology" could have been widely practised in the late Second Temple period, and in the period following the destruction of the temple into the 3rd, 4th, and 5th centuries C.E. Jewish and Samaritan magicians appear in the New Testament, Acts of the Apostles, and also in the works of Josephus, such as Atomos, a Jewish magician of Cyprus (Antiquities of the Jews 20:142).

Jewish magical practice was primarily oral, so scarce evidence remains of it.

During the rabbinic period, rabbinic sages prohibited various practices associated with Jewish magic. The collective term "Ways of the Amorites" (darkhei ha-Emori) is used by the sages to encompass an assortment of rituals and beliefs that a modern scholar would describe as magical. They range from attempts to divine the future through trivial incidents such as sparks emitted by a candle to wishing "health" when sneezing. However, rabbinic instruction in the Jerusalem Talmud states that "anything which heals is not forbidden because of ways of the Amorites."

== Magical papyri ==
The language of the papyri may be:

- Aramaic, as in Bodleian Heb.d83, a small fragment intended for placement in a metal magical amulet, found in Oxyrhynchus with twelve lines with an invocation "by the eye of Shemihaza" "for a dog to bite someone".
- Greek, as a subset of the Greek Magical Papyri catalogued by Karl Preisendanz and others.
- Hebrew, as Louvre E7020, which relates to Jewish Merkaba literature and angelic liturgy.

Jewish magical papyri supplement the evidences for angelology found in early rabbinic material, for example in identifying the existence of a national angel named Israel.

The character of Jewish magical papyri is often syncretic. Some "Jewish magical papyri" may not themselves be Jewish but syncretic invocations of the Tetragrammaton by non-Jews.

=== Importance for research ===
The discovery of magical papyri, primarily during the heyday of Near Eastern archaeology in the late 19th century, and subsequent interpretation and cataloguing, primarily during the early 20th century, has been followed by incorporation into academic research which has allowed Jewish magical papyri and magical inscriptions a supplemental role to major sources such as Pseudepigrapha, Apocrypha, Dead Sea Scrolls, Philo, Josephus, the New Testament, and the Talmud.

== Exorcism ==
A case of Jewish exorcism appears in Antiquities of the Jews (8.42–49), published by the Jewish historian Josephus in the 90s CE. In the account, a Jewish exorcist named Eleazar frees men possessed by demons in the presence of Vespasian and his troops. Eleazar places a ring containing a root prescribed by the biblical monarch Solomon under the possessed man's nose and recites incantations he composed, drawing out the demon through the nostrils and preventing it from returning. To demonstrate his power to onlookers, he commands the demon to overturn a cup or footbasin, which it does, signaling that it has abandoned its host. Josephus situates the miracle within a broader portrayal of Solomon's unparalleled wisdom, presenting him as possessing advanced knowledge of natural and supernatural phenomena. The narrative attributes the recognition and acclaim to Solomon rather than to Eleazar, forming a structural distinction from typical miracle stories.

Another story related to exorcism appears elsewhere in Antiquities of the Jews (6.166–169), when Josephus recounts the biblical story of Saul. According to the biblical narrative, Saul is tormented by evil spirits and is relieved by David's playing. In Josephus's version, he presents David as performing an exorcistic function: physicians cannot relieve Saul's distress, so David is brought to the court, where he restores Saul through singing and playing the harp, expelling the spirits and returning him to his right mind.

== Magical treatises ==
Two Jewish magical treatises from antiquity have survived. One of them, Sefer HaRazim, or the Book of Mysteries, is generally dated to the middle of the first millennium CE. Composed in Hebrew, it is thought to have originated in either Palaestina or Egypt. According to its preface, the book was used by biblical figures such as Noah and King Solomon. It presents a structured magical system organized around seven heavens, each inhabited by a distinct group of angels assigned specific magical functions. The text contains 28 magical recipes through which a practitioner could enlist these angels to carry out desired aims. Although it reflects familiarity with Greco-Egyptian magical traditions, it reshapes them within a distinctly Jewish framework.

Another important Jewish treatise from late antiquity is Harba de-Moshe, or The Sword of Moses, a work written in Aramaic and Hebrew. It is generally believed to have been compiled in the third quarter of the first millennium CE, and its exact place of composition remains unknown. The work centers on a collection of divine and angelic names said to derive from the "sword" granted to Moses in heaven when he ascended to receive the Torah. When used according to the book’s magical recipes (140 of which appear in its final chapter) these names were believed to enable a wide range of acts, including healing and self-protection, enhancing memory, and harming enemies.

== Amulets and curse texts ==
=== Knots ===
Rabbinic literature preserves several references to protective "knots" (qesharim) worn by children. The Mishnah (Shabbat 6:9) notes that boys could go out wearing such "knots" on the Shabbat, implying they were considered part of normal dress. Later discussion in the Babylonian Talmud expands on their function through the views of two amoraic sages who describe healing practices involving tied bundles and amulets. Abaye describes a traditional remedy attributed to his mother: tying three "knots" could stop an illness, five might heal it, and seven were believed powerful enough to ward off witchcraft. Rav Huna prescribes an amulet for tertian fever made from multiple materials arranged in groups of seven. A later legal work, the Geonic-period Sepher ha-Ma'asim, adds that children could wear knots only until about age nine. That implies that "knots" were understood as safeguards for the more vulnerable young and were regulated once a child was older.

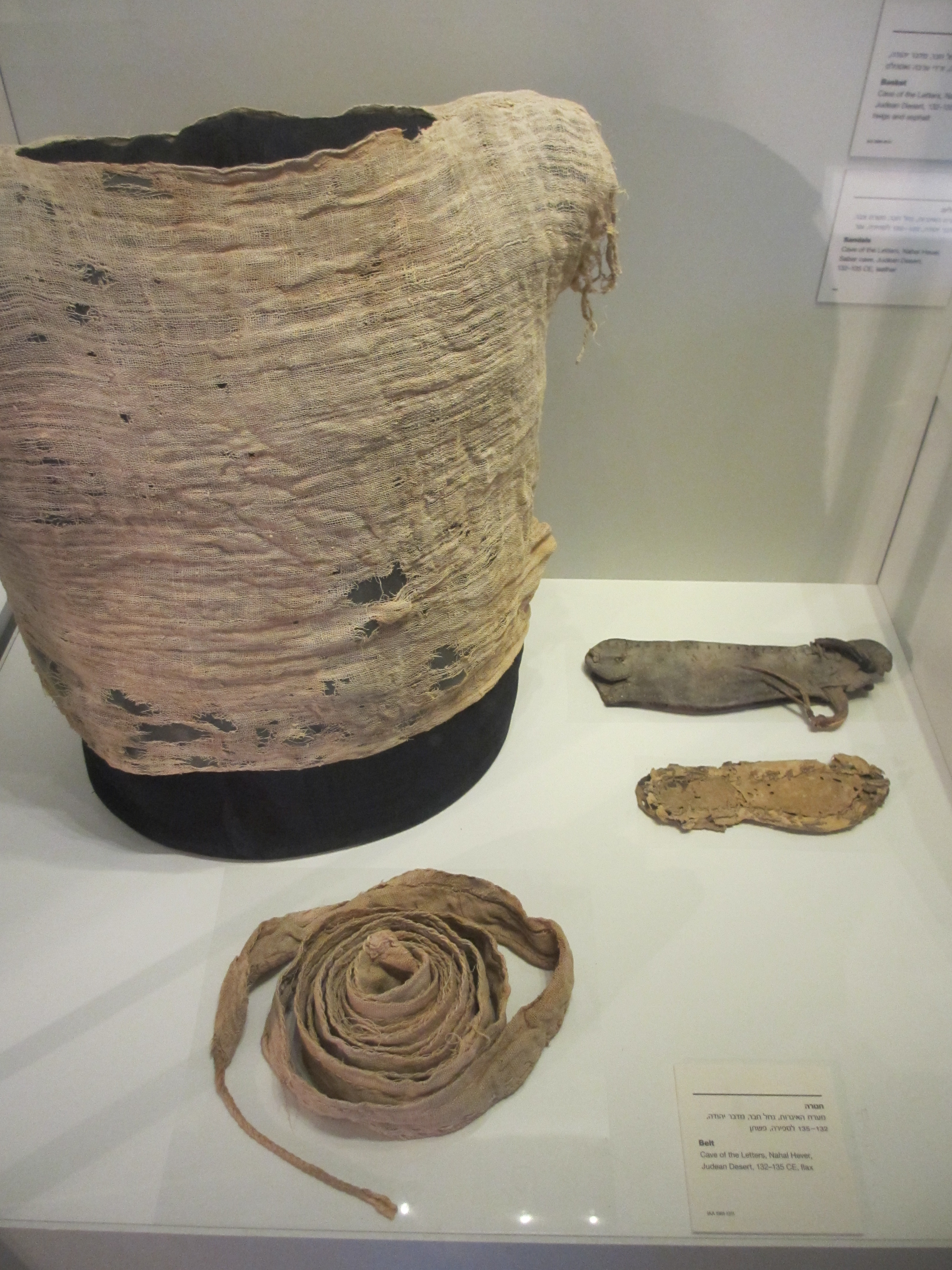
Child's shirt from the Bar Kokhba-era Cave of Letters (c. 135/6 CE). It featured "knots": bundles containing organic materials, used as amulets to protect children from danger and disease

Archaeology provides confirmation that such practices were real. In the Cave of Letters, a Bar Kokhba refuge cave in the Judaean Desert, a child's linen shirt dating to the 130s CE was discovered with small tied pouches sewn into it, which are thought to be the "knots" mentioned in rabbinic literature. These bundles contained items such as shells, salt, and seeds, materials commonly used in protective charms across the ancient Mediterranean.

=== Inscribed amulets and defixios ===
Archaeological evidence from the late-antique southern Levant attests to the practice of love magic among Jews. One example is a ceramic love amulet discovered at the synagogal complex of Horvat Rimmon in southern Israel, dated to the 5th–6th century CE. It consists of five inscribed potsherds arranged into a trapezoidal object bearing an Aramaic incantation intended to arouse love in a specific individual. The physical condition of the artifact suggests it was designed to be heated or burned as part of the magical procedure. The incantation opens with a sequence of six magical or angelic names enclosed in circular frames and concludes with non-alphabetic magical characters resembling Paleo-Hebrew and Greek letters. These angels are adjured to inflame the heart, mind, and inner organs of the named target, explicitly comparing the burning of the clay amulet to the desired kindling of passion in the spell's target. Nearly identical formulas are attested in medieval Jewish magical manuscripts from the Cairo Geniza, indicating that such recipes were already in circulation centuries earlier. According to Gideon Bohak, this continuity suggests the "wide circulation of such magical recipe books in late antique Palestine and probably in Egypt as well."

Also found in a synagogal context—specifically beneath the entrance threshold—is another magical item: that of Yose, son of Zenobia, from Meroth, an ancient (now ruined) town in Upper Galilee. This bronze defixio (binding spell) praises God using passages from Psalms and seeks to subjugate the entire community to Yose's will. Its placement beneath the synagogue's entrance may have been intended to activate the spell. The burial of magical objects in synagogues is also recommended in The Sword of Moses, which advises placing an inscribed lamella there to instill fear in others.

Amulets are also known to have been dedicated to the health of individuals. A copper amulet from Horvat Kanaf in the Golan Heights, bears an Aramaic spell intended to protect "Rabbi Eleazar son of Esther." It threats demons with punishment if they harm him and calls upon three angels associated with illness, Bobrit, Tabri and Bashtarot, to restore his health.

There is also evidence for aggressive and competitive Jewish magic in Late Antiquity, in the form of agonistic curse tablets associated with chariot racing. A Jewish curse tablet written in Jewish Palestinian Aramaic and datable to the 5th and 6th century CE, was discovered near the first turning-post of the hippodrome of Antioch, a place commonly used for circus curse tablets in the Greco-Roman world. The tablet was engraved on a lead lamella and deposited in a drain, employing binding techniques known from Greek and Latin agonistic defixiones and intended to affect the outcome of races through ritual "sinking" and proximity to the turning-post. While the tablet uses conventional agonistic curse techniques, its language, script, and formulae identify it as distinctly Jewish. The text invokes the God of Israel alongside several archangels, including Michael, Gabriel and Raphael, in formulas characteristic of Jewish magical adjurations. It also draws on biblical historiolae, referencing the angel who blocked Balaam's she-ass and evoking imagery from the parting of the Red Sea to symbolically halt of "sink" rival racing horses.

Rabbinic literature also provides ample discussions of amulets among acceptable magical practices. The Mishnah, at tractate Shabbat, mentions amulets alongside mezuzot and phylacteries. The Jerusalem Talmud asserts that a doctor can detect such amulets: it states that "a physician may be relied upon to state, 'with this amulet I performed a healing, and did so a second and a third time with it as well.'"

== Babylonian incantation bowls ==
Many late-antique Jewish incantation bowls were found in the region referred to in Jewish sources as Babylonia, corresponding to Mesopotamia, which was under the rule of the Sasanian Empire at the time. These ceramic bowls bear apotropaic texts, primarily intended to protect individuals and households from demons and witchcraft, or, less commonly, from sickness. The bowls are dated to the 5th through 7th centuries CE, and appear to have been sold to both Jewish and non-Jewish customers. They were usually buried upside down in homes and cemeteries, likely based on the belief that the bowl functioned as a trap for demons. This idea is supported by the manner of deposition, the wording of the texts, the way they are glued together to form a surrounding space, and by the images of demons that sometimes appear at the center of the bowls. The writing on the bowls usually begins at the center and spirals outward, or vice versa.

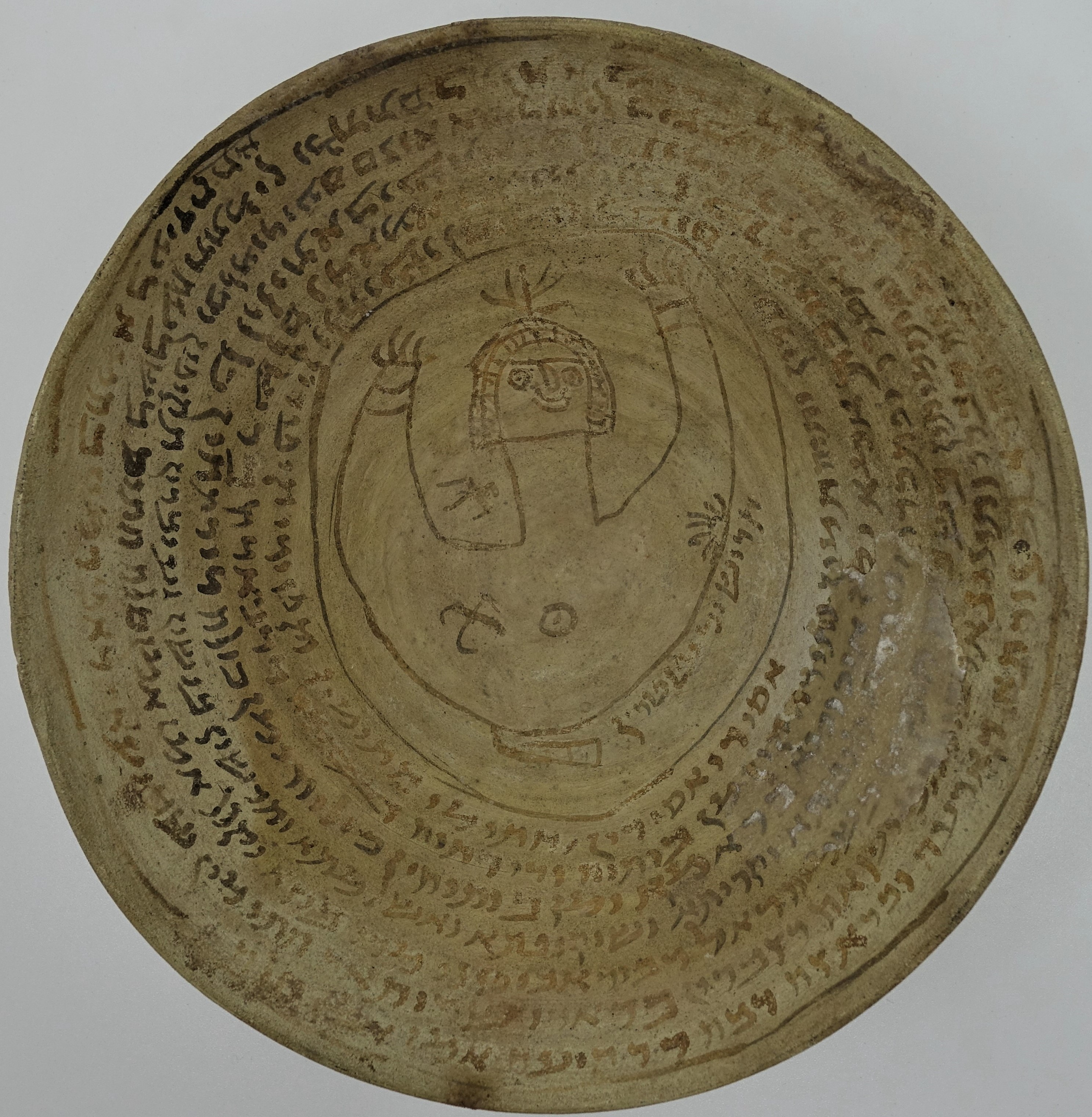
Late-antique incantation bowl inscribed in Jewish Babylonian Aramaic, using Hebrew square-script, in the collection of the Jewish Museum of Switzerland

The first incantation bowls were discovered in the 19th century in Iraq and western Iran. Over half of the documented bowls—around 400—are written in Jewish Babylonian Aramaic, a dialect of Aramaic known from the Babylonian Talmud. The rest are written in other languages. Many are in Mandaic and include concepts drawn from Mandaeism, while others are in Syriac, in proto-Manichaean or Estrangelo scripts, and feature a larger variety of cultural contexts, Christian and pagan. More rare are bowls in Pahlavi or Arabic scripts.

The Jewish bowls feature many biblical texts, most of which are from the original Hebrew version, though others are from Aramaic translation of the Bible. Passages from the Mishnah are also attested. This attests to biblical and rabbinic knowledge of the bowl-scribes. Some bowls feature depictions of demons, often in shackles. Some incantation bowls seem to have a more aggressive purpose. One special genre consists of the so-called "qibla" (קיבלא; qyblʾ) bowls, whose purpose is the return of curses to those who sent them. Within this framework appears a distinctive formula, referring to elders sitting in a furnace (atuna, אתונא) and in the Dead Sea.

The bowls exhibit a high degree of repetition in formulas, structures and types. At times, text appears on the exterior of a vessel, referring to its intended placement. They also display criteria unique to the region of Sasanian Babylonia, which do not appear in other areas where Jewish magical practices are known. These include Persian loanwords and names, as well as elements derived from neighboring cultures, including influences from earlier Babylonian practices.

== See also ==
- Witchcraft and divination in the Hebrew Bible
- Magic in the Greco-Roman world
- Greek Magical Papyri
- Practical Kabbalah

== Bibliography ==
- Bohak, Gideon (2008). Ancient Jewish Magic: a History. Cambridge University Press. pp. 156–157, 220–223, 271, 320. ISBN 9780521874571.
- Bohak, Gideon (2019). "Jewish Amulets, Magic Bowls, and Manuals in Aramaic and Hebrew". In Frankfurter, David (ed.). Guide to the Study of Ancient Magic. Brill. pp. 388–415. doi:10.1163/9789004390751_017. ISBN 9789004390751.
- Bohak, Gideon; Bellusci, Alessia (2019). "The Greek Prayer to Helios in Sefer Ha-Razim, in Light of New Textual Evidence". Cultural Plurality in Ancient Magical Texts and Practices. Mohr Siebeck. pp. 259–275. ISBN 9783161564796.
- Duling, Dennis C. (April 1985). "The Eleazar Miracle and Solomon's Magical Wisdom in Flavius Josephus's". Harvard Theological Review. 78 (1–2): 1–25. doi:10.1017/S001781600002736X. ISSN 1475-4517.
- Folmer, Margaretha; Elitzur-Leiman, Rivka (2023). "A Jewish Aramaic Circus Curse Tablet from Antioch". Aramaic Studies. 21 (1). Brill: 64–111. doi:10.1163/17455227-bja10041. hdl:1887/3674044.
- Harari, Yuval (2012). "The Sword of Moses (Ḥarba de-Moshe): A New Translation and Introduction". Magic, Ritual, and Witchcraft. 7 (1): 58–98. doi:10.1353/mrw.2012.0008. ISSN 1940-5111.
- Levene, Dan (2013). Jewish Aramaic Curse Texts from Late-Antique Mesopotamia: "May These Curses Go Out and Flee". Magical and Religious Literature of Late Antiquity. Vol. 2. Brill. ISBN 978-90-04-25726-9.
- Saar, Ortal-Paz (2017). Jewish Love Magic: From Late Antiquity to the Middle Ages. Leiden and Boston: Brill. ISBN 978-90-04-34788-5.
- Stern, Karen B. (2016). "Harnessing the Sacred: Hidden Writing and "Private" Spaces in Levantine Synagogues". Inscriptions in the Private Sphere in the Greco-Roman World. Brill Studies in Greek and Roman Epigraphy. Vol. 7. Brill. pp. 213–247. doi:10.1163/9789004307124_011. ISBN 9789004307124.
- Werlin, Steven H. (2015). "The Judean Shephelah: Rimmon". Ancient Synagogues of Southern Palestine, 300-800 C.E. Brill. pp. 222–236. doi:10.1163/9789004298408_006.
