= Gustav Adolf Deissmann =

German theologian (1866–1937)

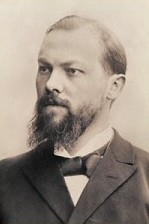
- Born: 7 November 1866; Langenscheid, Rhein-Lahn, Kingdom of Prussia
- Died: 5 April 1937 (aged 70); Wünsdorf, Germany
- Other name: Deißmann
- Occupation: theologian
- Known for: work on the Greek language used in the New Testament

Gustav Adolf Deissmann (7 November 1866 – 5 April 1937) was a German Protestant theologian, best known for his leading work on the Greek language used in the New Testament, which he showed was the koine, or commonly used tongue of the Hellenistic world of that time.

== Life ==
Deissmann was professor of theology at the Ruprecht Karl University of Heidelberg (1897–1908), and then at the Friedrich Wilhelms University of Berlin (1908–1935). He was twice nominated for the Nobel Peace Prize, and held eight honorary doctorates from 6 different countries.

In 1904 he founded, together with Albrecht Dieterich, the Eranos circle in Heidelberg. Members included Ernst Troeltsch, Max Weber, Eberhard Gothein, Georg Jellinek, Karl Rathgen, and Wilhelm Windelband.

In Berlin, Deissmann's academic focus began to shift from Greek philology to the ecumenical movement, church reform and, significantly, international Völkerverständigung (i.e. peace-promoting mutual understanding between nations and cultures). From 1914 until 1922 he produced a regular semi-political international communiqué, the Evangelischer Wochenbrief (1914–1921), with its English equivalent Protestant Weekly Letters (1914–1917). Its target audience was primarily influential German and American Christians, and it provided a forum for the advancement of peace and understanding among nations.

In 1925 Deissmann became aware of the disintegration of ancient Ephesus, a historically important archaeological site, partly excavated before World War I under the auspices of the Austrian Archaeological Institute. Deissmann campaigned single-handedly for several years, both on a national and international level, to raise awareness of the plight of Ephesus, and managed to organise funding for the archaeological work to recommence in 1926, and continued annually until 1929.

Deissmann died on 5 April 1937, in Wünsdorf near Berlin, where he is buried in the local cemetery.

== Selected works by Deissmann ==
- Deissmann, Gustav Adolf (1892). Die neutestamentliche Formel "in Christo Jesu" untersucht (Habilitationsschrift).
- ——— (1895). Bibelstudien. Beiträge, zumeist aus den Papyri und Inschriften, zur Geschichte der Sprache, des Schrifttums und der Religion des hellenistischen Judentums und des Urchristentums. Marburg.
- ——— (1897). Neue Bibelstudien. Sprachgeschichtliche Beiträge, zumeist aus den Papyri und Inschriften, zur Erklärung des Neuen Testaments. Marburg.
- ——— (1901). Bible Studies: Contributions chiefly from papyri and inscriptions, to the history of language, the literature and the religion of Hellenistic Judaism and primitive Christianity. Translated by Grieve, A. Edinburgh.
- ——— (1905). Veröffentlichungen aus der Heidelberger Papyrus-Sammlung. I, Die Septuaginta-Papyri und andere altchristliche Texte. Heidelberg.
- ——— (1908). The philology of the Greek bible: its present and its future. Translated by Strachan, L.R.M. London.
- ——— (1908). Licht vom Osten. Das Neue Testament und die neuentdeckten Texte der hellenistisch-römischen Welt. Tübingen.
- ——— (1910). Light from the ancient East. The New Testament illustrated by recently discovered texts of the Graeco-Roman world. Translated by Strachan, L.R.M. London.
- ——— (1911). Paulus. Eine kultur- und religionsgeschichtliche Skizze. Tubingen.
- ——— (1914–21). Evangelischer Wochenbrief.
- ——— (1914–17). Protestant Weekly Letter.
- ——— (1923). The religion of Jesus and the faith of Paul. The Selly Oak Lectures, 1923 on the communion of Jesus with God & the communion of Paul with Christ. Translated by Wilson, W.E. London.
- ——— (1925). "Adolf Deissmann". In Stange, E. (ed.). Die Religionswissenschaft der Gegenwart in Selbstdarstellungen. Leipzig. pp. 42–78.

== See also ==
- Tiberius Julius Abdes Pantera
