= Richard Wünsch =

German classical philologist (1869-1915)

Richard Wünsch (1 June 1869 in Wiesbaden – 17 May 1915 at Iłża) was a German classical philologist.

He studied classical philology primarily at the University of Marburg, and also at the Universities of Berlin and Bonn. He received his doctorate in 1893. Following graduation, he spent two years on an extended study trip to Paris, Spain, Italy and Greece. He obtained his habilitation in Breslau, and in 1902 was appointed professor of classical philology at the University of Giessen. Later on, he held professorships at the universities of Königsberg (from 1907) and Münster (from 1913). During World War I, he died at Iłża at the age of 45, while serving as a battalion leader during an assault on the Russian army.

== Career ==
Wünsch supported his doctoral adviser Albrecht Dieterich on the latter's theory of manuum vellatio. Wünsch noted that this ritual had been indigenous to the Roman worship of Fides.

Wünsch also was a collector of curse tablets. He had the Kaklık diptych curse tablet in his collection, but it is unknown why he did not comment on it.

== Selected works ==
- De Taciti Germaniae codicibus Germanicis, 1893. On Tacitus' Germania.
- Sethianische Verfluchungstafeln aus Rom, 1898 – Sethian curse tablets of Rome.
- Ioannis Laurentii Lydi liber de mensibus (edition of John the Lydian; 1898).
- Das Frühlingsfest der Insel Malta, 1902 – The spring festival of Malta.
- Antikes Zaubergerät aus Pergamon, 1905 – On the ancient magical devices found at Pergamon by the Athens Institute which had references to the goddesses Hecate, Persephone and Artemis Leucophryene. The devices also referred to the angels from the Judaic canon: Michael, Gabriel, Raguel and Raphael.
- Antike Fluchtafeln, 1907 – Ancient curse tablets.
- Aus einem griechischen Zauberpapyrus, 1911 – Greek Magical Papyri.

As editor:

- Eine Mithrasliturgie (by Albrecht Dieterich; 2nd edition by Wünsch in 1910) – A Mithras Liturgy.
- Mutter Erde: ein Versuch über Volksreligion (by Albrecht Dieterich; 2nd edition by Wünsch in 1913) – Mother Earth; an essay on folk religion.
- Kleine Schriften (by Albrecht Dieterich) - 1911.
- Religionsgeschichtlichte Versuche und Vorarbeiten - 1908-1915.
- Archiv für Religionwissenschaft - 1908-1915.
- Inscriptiones Graecae - Defixionum Tabellae Atticae (III.3) - Berlin, 1897
