= Incantation bowl =

Bowls used in magic to protect against evil influences

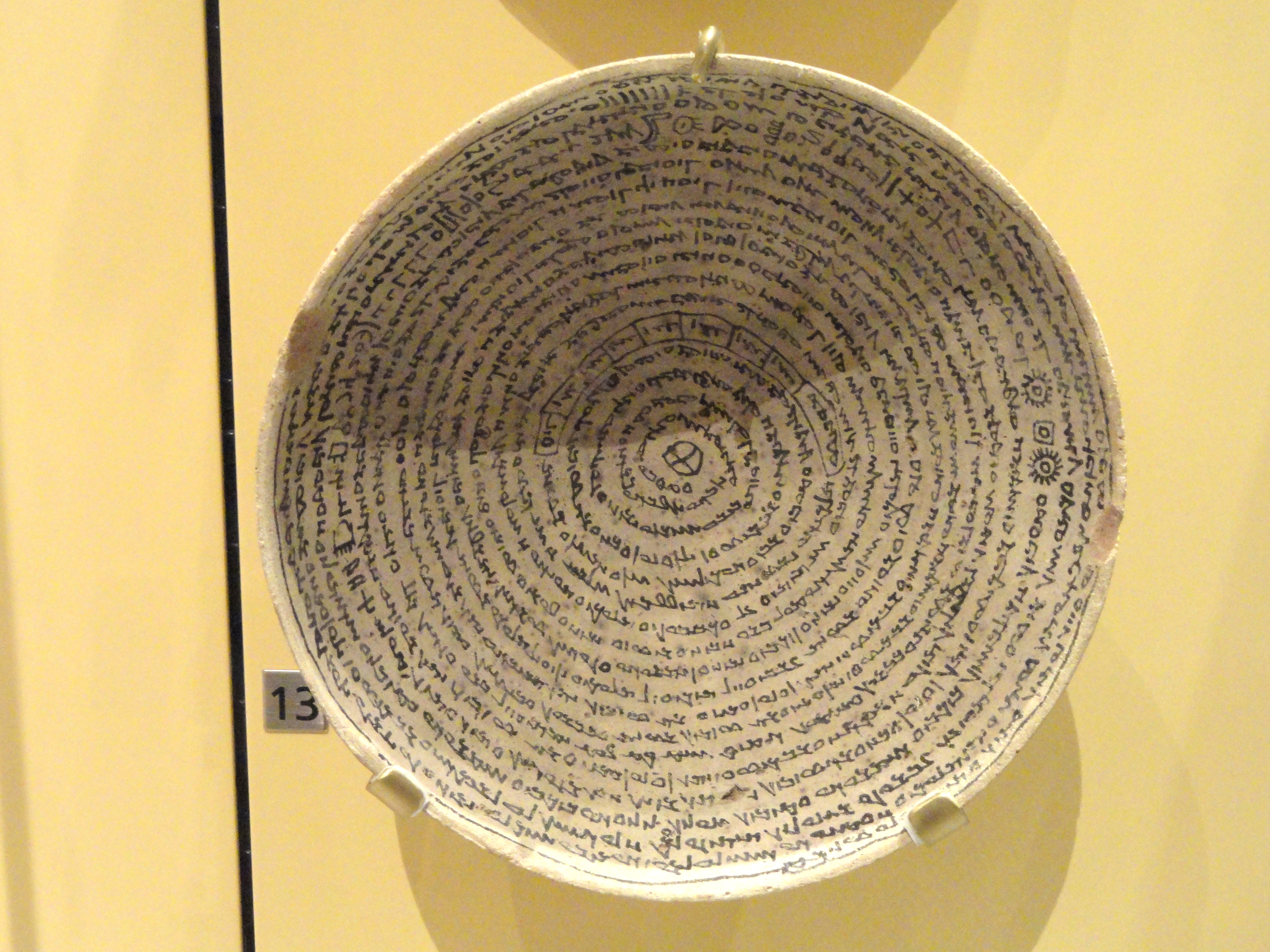
Mandaic-language incantation bowl

Incantation bowls are a form of protective magic found in what is now Iraq and Iran. Produced in the Middle East during late antiquity from the sixth to eighth centuries, particularly in Upper Mesopotamia and Syria, the bowls were usually inscribed in a spiral, beginning from the rim and moving toward the center. Most are inscribed in Jewish Babylonian Aramaic.

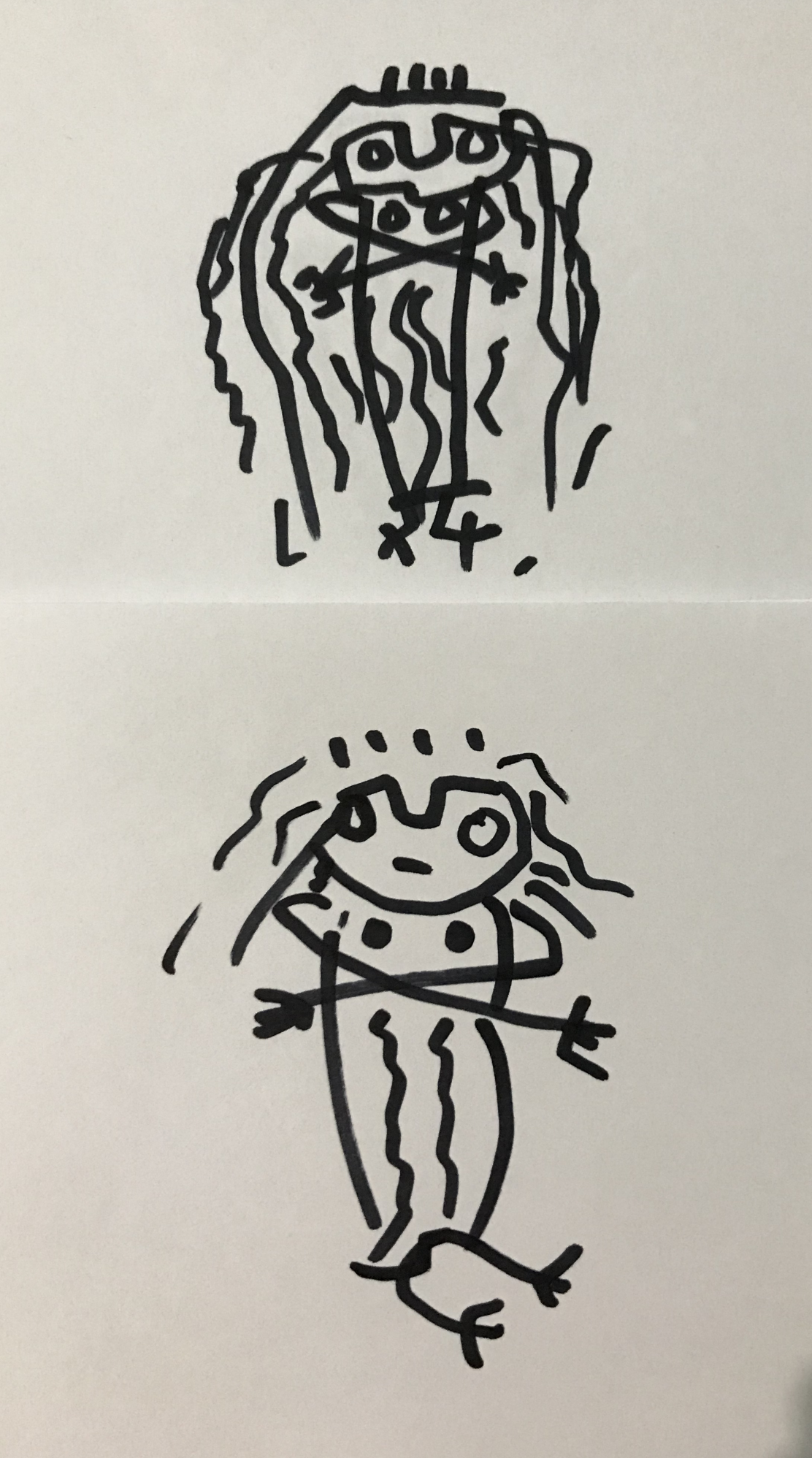
There is often a female figure at the center of the spiraling script.

Scholar John Charles Arnold states the bowls were used as such: "When placed upside down under each corner of a house, demons would follow the inscribed charms that spiraled from the outer rim inward, only to be caught in the center." They were commonly placed under the threshold, courtyards, in the corner of the homes of the recently deceased and in cemeteries.

The majority of Mesopotamia's population were either Christian, Manichaean, Mandaean, Jewish, or adherents of the ancient Babylonian religion, all of whom spoke Aramaic dialects by the end of the Achaemenid Persian Empire. Zoroastrians who spoke Persian also lived here. Mandaeans and Jews each used their own Aramaic variety, although very closely related. A subcategory of incantation bowls are those used in Jewish and Christian magical practice (see Jewish magical papyri for context). The majority of recovered incantation bowls were written in Jewish Aramaic. These are followed in frequency by the Mandaic language and then Syriac. A handful of bowls have been discovered that were written in Arabic or Persian. An estimated 10% of incantation bowls were not written in any real language but pseudo-script. They are thought to be forgeries by illiterate “scribes” and sold to illiterate clients. The bowls are thought to have been regularly commissioned across religious lines.

== Archaeological finds ==
To date only around 2000 incantation bowls have been registered as archaeological finds, but since they are widely dug up in the Middle East, there may be tens of thousands in the hands of private collectors and traders. Aramaic incantation bowls from Sasanian Mesopotamia are an important source for studying the everyday beliefs of Jews, Christians, Mandaeans, Manichaeans, Zoroastrians, and pagans on the eve of the early Muslim conquests.

== In Judaism ==
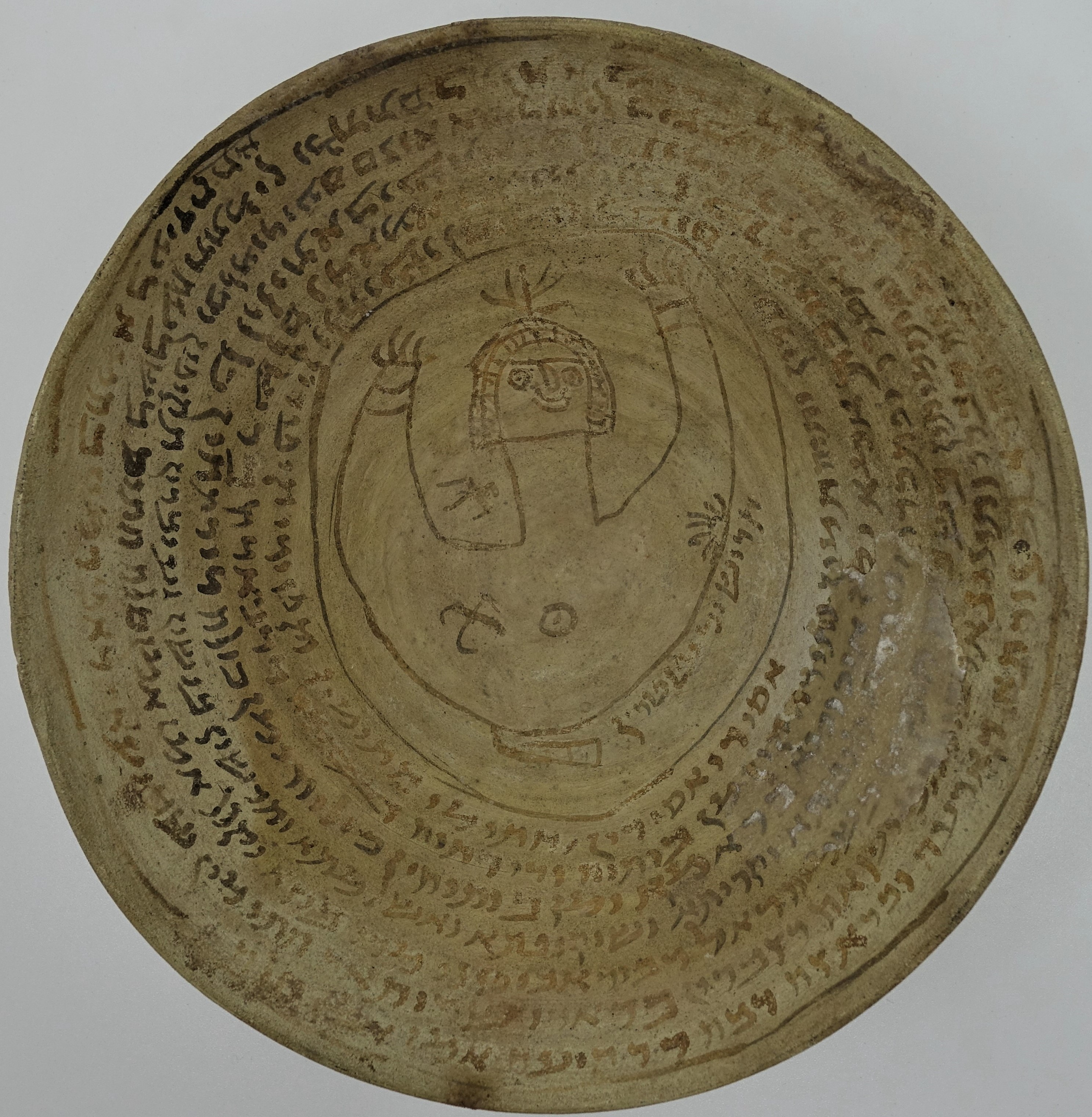
Incantation bowl inscribed in Babylonian Aramaic, using Hebrew square-script, dated between 400 and 800, in the collection of the Jewish Museum of Switzerland.

A subcategory of incantation bowls are those used in Jewish magical practice. Aramaic incantation bowls are an important source of knowledge about Jewish magical practices, particularly the nearly eighty surviving Jewish incantation bowls from Babylon during the rule by the Sasanian Empire (226-636), primarily from the Jewish diaspora settlement in Nippur. These bowls were used in magic to protect against evil influences such as the evil eye, Lilith, and Bagdana. These bowls could be used by any member of the community, and almost every house excavated in the Jewish settlement in Nippur had such bowls buried in them.

The inscriptions often include scriptural quotes and quotes from rabbinic texts. The text on incantation bowls is the only written material documenting Jewish language and religion recovered from the period around the writing of the Babylonian Talmud. Scholars say that the use of rabbinic texts demonstrates that they were considered to have supernatural power comparable to that of biblical quotes. The bowls often refer to themselves as "amulets" and the Talmud discusses the use of amulets and magic to drive away demons.

== In Islam ==
In the Islamic medieval period, what is referred to in the literature as talismanic or magic bowls performed a similar function. They represent the syncretism of the Islamic tradition and occult sciences. The bowls, most often made of metal rather than clay, were covered in Arabic script, most often verses from the Quran or a hadith, and occasionally with Numerology or Astrology. They were most often used for healing by drinking the water that was left in these bowls overnight.

== In Mandaeism ==
There are also many incantation bowls written in Mandaic. Mandaic incantation bowls have been found in various archaeological sites in southern Mesopotamia, including bowls from Nippur that date to the early Islamic era.

Many are kept in museums and private collections around the world, including the British Museum and the Moussaieff Collection.

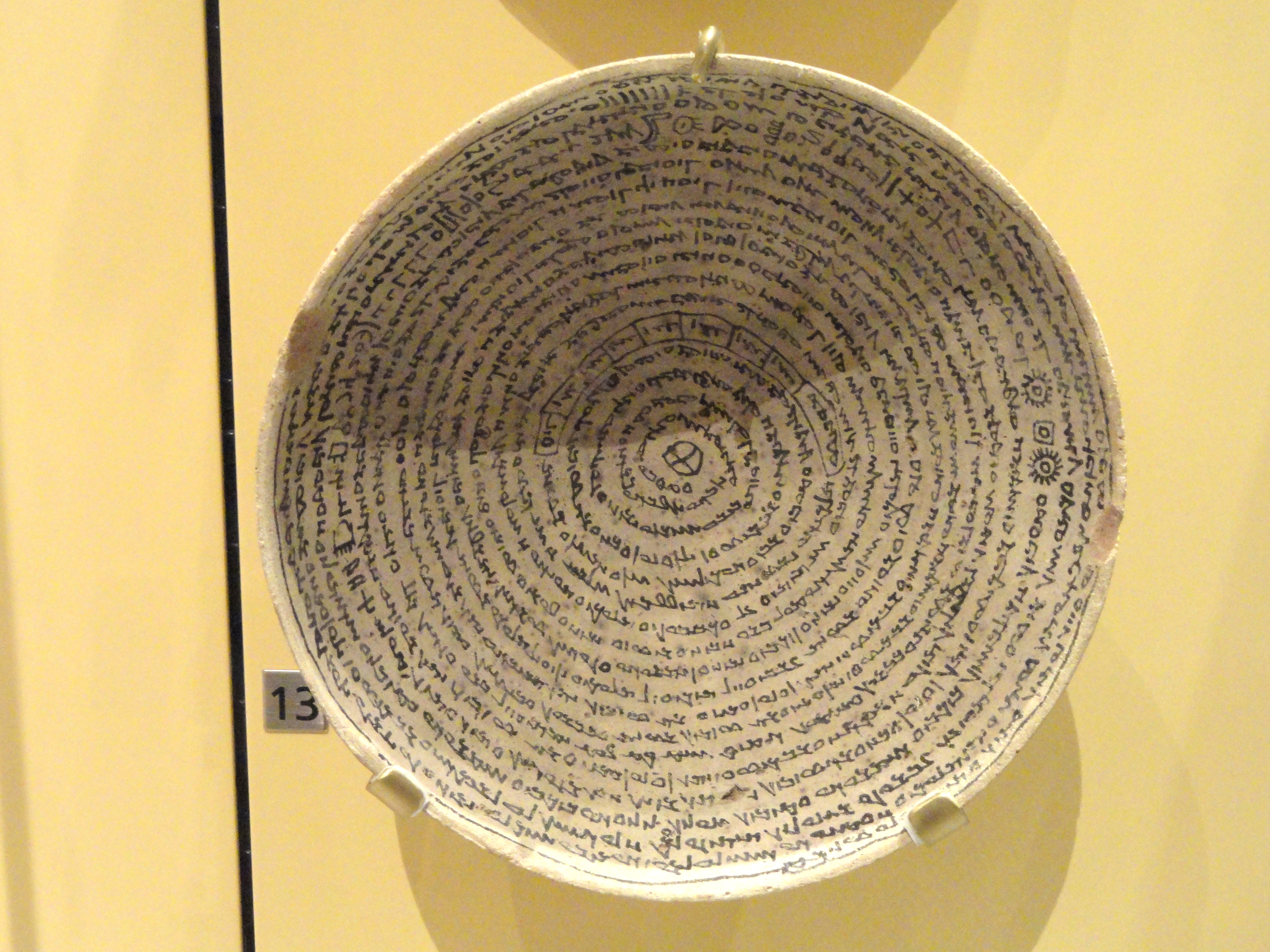
Bowl with incantation for Buktuya and household, c. 200-600 AD - Royal Ontario Museum

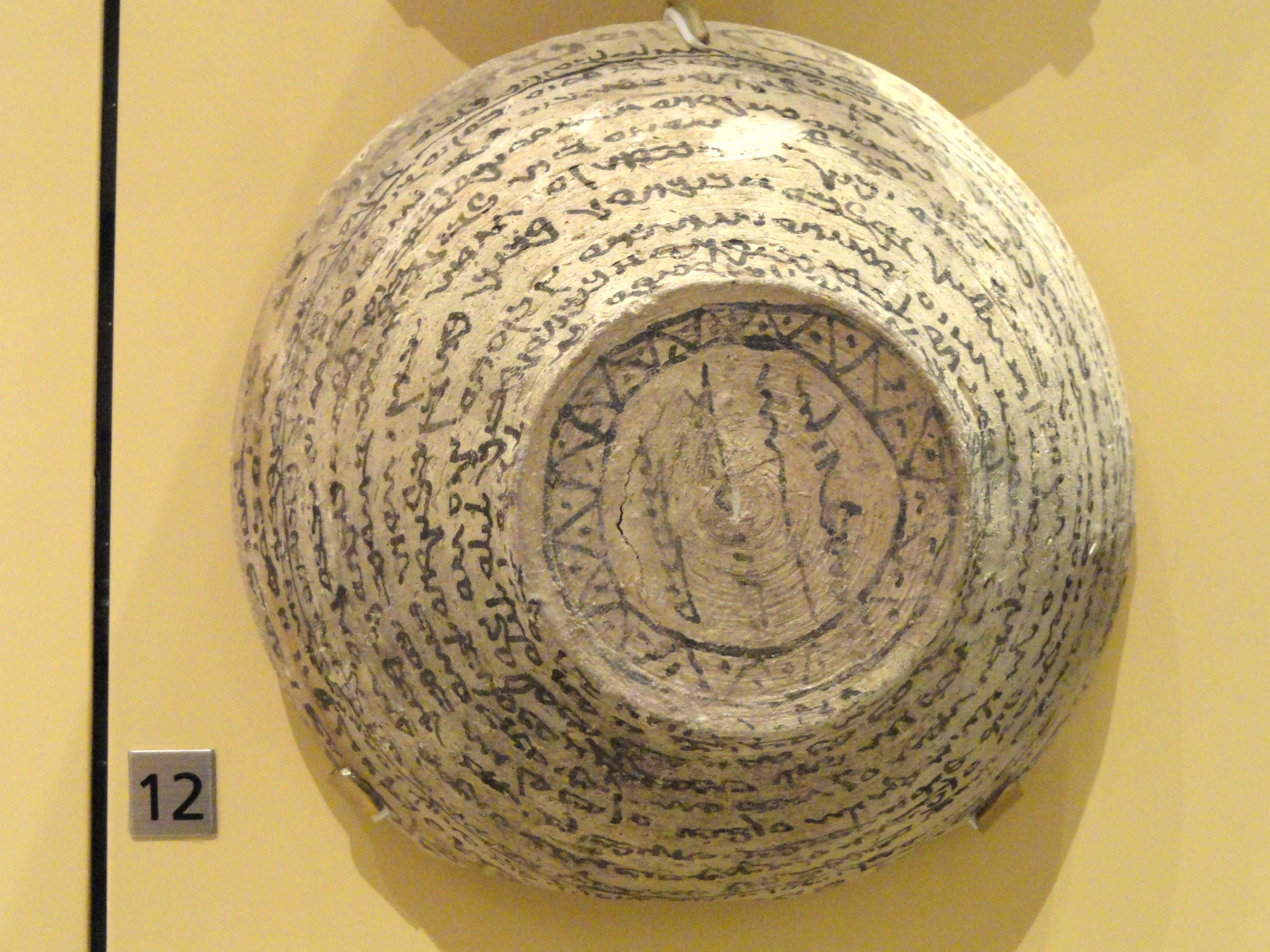
Bowl with incantation for Kuktan Pruk during her pregnancy, Southern Mesopotamia, c. 200-600 AD - Royal Ontario Museum

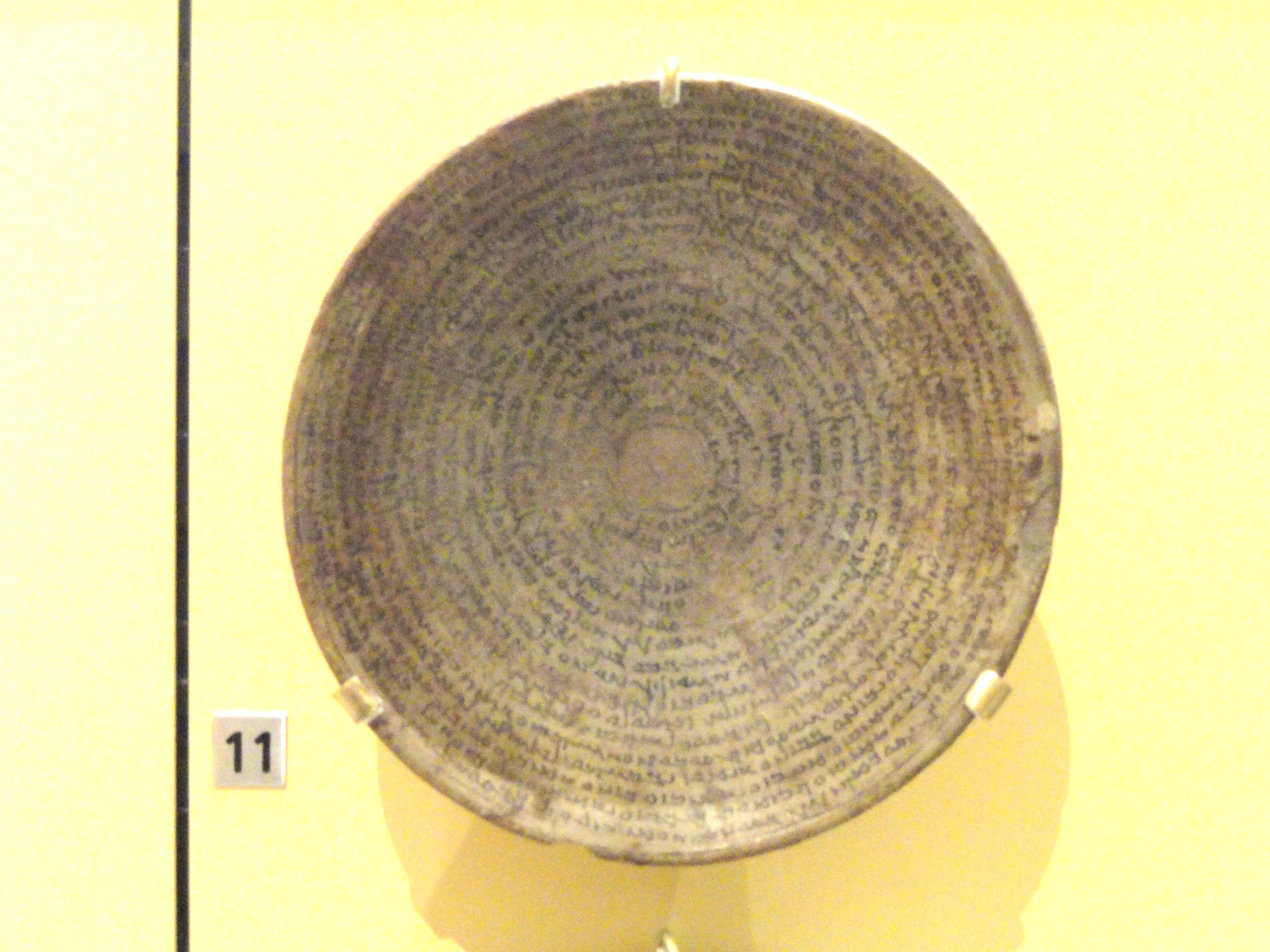
Bowl with incantation to protect Anush Busai and his family against bad luck, southern Mesopotamia, c. 200-600 AD - Royal Ontario Museum

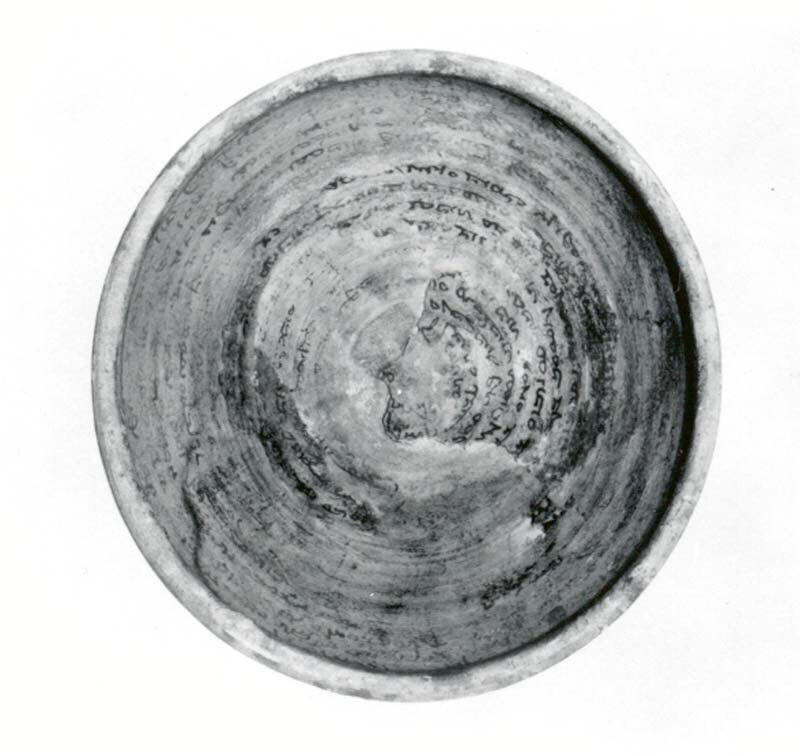
Incantation bowl with Mandaic inscription

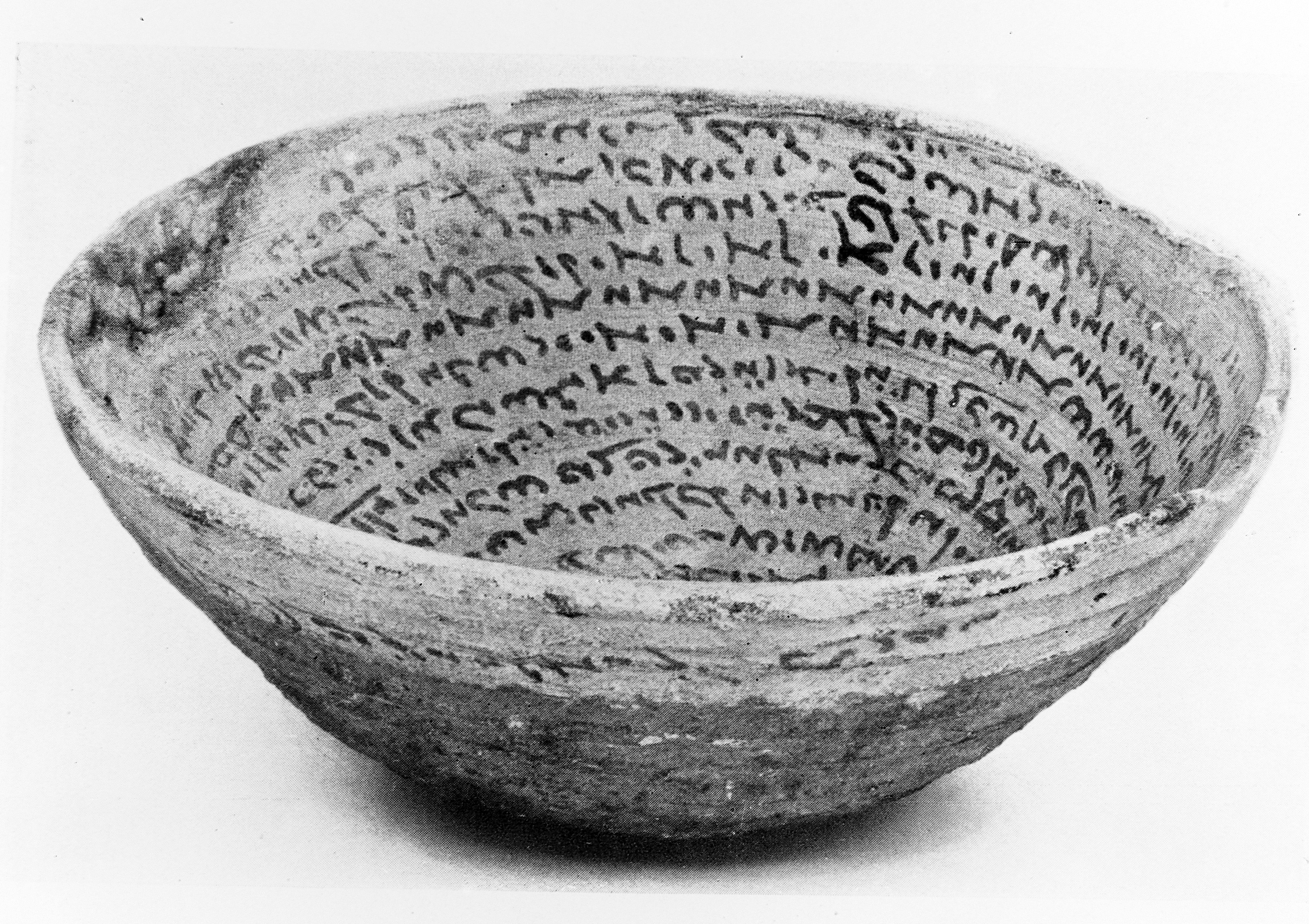
Incantation bowl with inscriptions in Mandaic, Mesopotamia

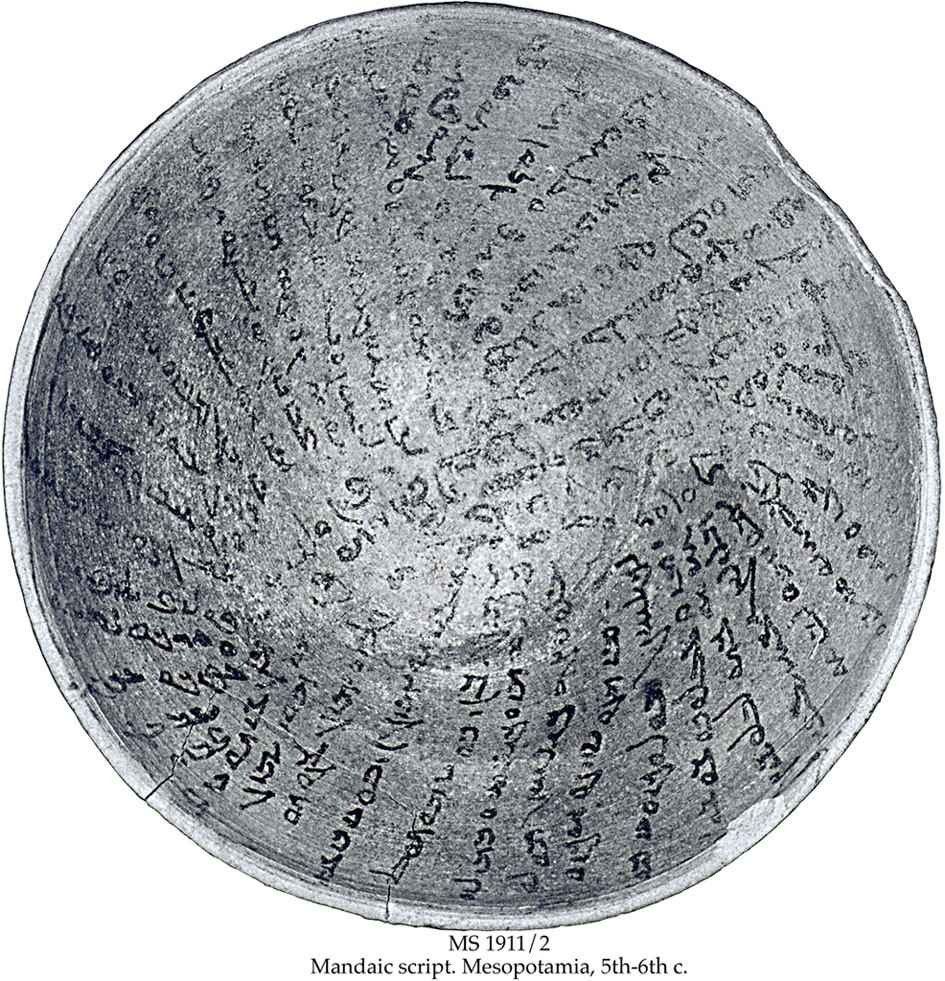
c. 5th-7th century, incantation bowl, 19x7.5 cm, 44 lines in cursive Mandaic script in 3 blocks at different angles radiating from the centre

== See also ==
- Demons in Mandaeism
- Phaistos Disc
