= Albrecht Dieterich =

German philologist (1866-1908)

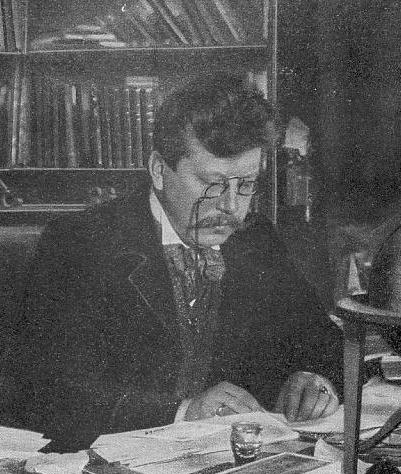
- Spouse: Maria Usener
- Children: Hermann Sr., Hermann Jr.
- Parent(s): Albrecht Sr & Henriette Münscher D.

Academic background
- Thesis: PhD: Papyrus magica Musei Lugdunensis Batavi quam C. Leemans edidit in Papyrorum Graecarum tomo II, V. (Bonn, 1888)
- Doctoral advisor: Hermann Usener
- Influences: Aeschylus; Aristophanes; Hesiod; Erwin Rohde; Wilhelm Mannhardt; August Mau; Johann Jakob Bachofen; Albrecht Ritschl

Academic work
- Discipline: Classics, Philology
- School or tradition: Eranos
- Notable students: Ludwig Deubner, Friedrich Pfister, Eugen Fehrle, Otto Weinreich, Richard Wünsch, Adam Abt, Ludwig Fahz, Adolf Erman, Georg Möller, Karl Preisendanz
- Influenced: Carl Jung; Ludwig Klages; Walter Otto; Max Weber; Samson Eitrem; Friedrich Heiler; Joachim Wach; Gerard van der Leeuw; E. O. James; Raffaele Pettazzoni; Mircea Eliade; Richard Reitzenstein

Albrecht Dieterich (2 May 1866 – 6 May 1908) was a German classical philologist and scholar of religion born in Hersfeld.

== Academic background ==
He studied at the Universities of Leipzig and Bonn. At Leipzig he studied with professors Georg Curtius, Otto Crusius and Otto Ribbeck. At Bonn he studied with Franz Bücheler, Reinhard Kekulé von Stradonitz and Hermann Usener (1834–1905). Usener in 1899 became Dieterich's father-in-law. In 1888 he earned his doctorate, and three years later received his habilitation in Marburg with a dissertation on Orphism. He had come to Marburg on the insistence of Georg Wissowa and even contributed the entry on Aeschylus in the Pauly-Wissowa Realencyclopädie der classischen Altertumswissenschaft. For his Staatsexamen, he chose the theme 'What do we know about Plato's theism or pantheism?'. Afterwards he traveled to Italy and Greece for research purposes during the years 1892-1895.

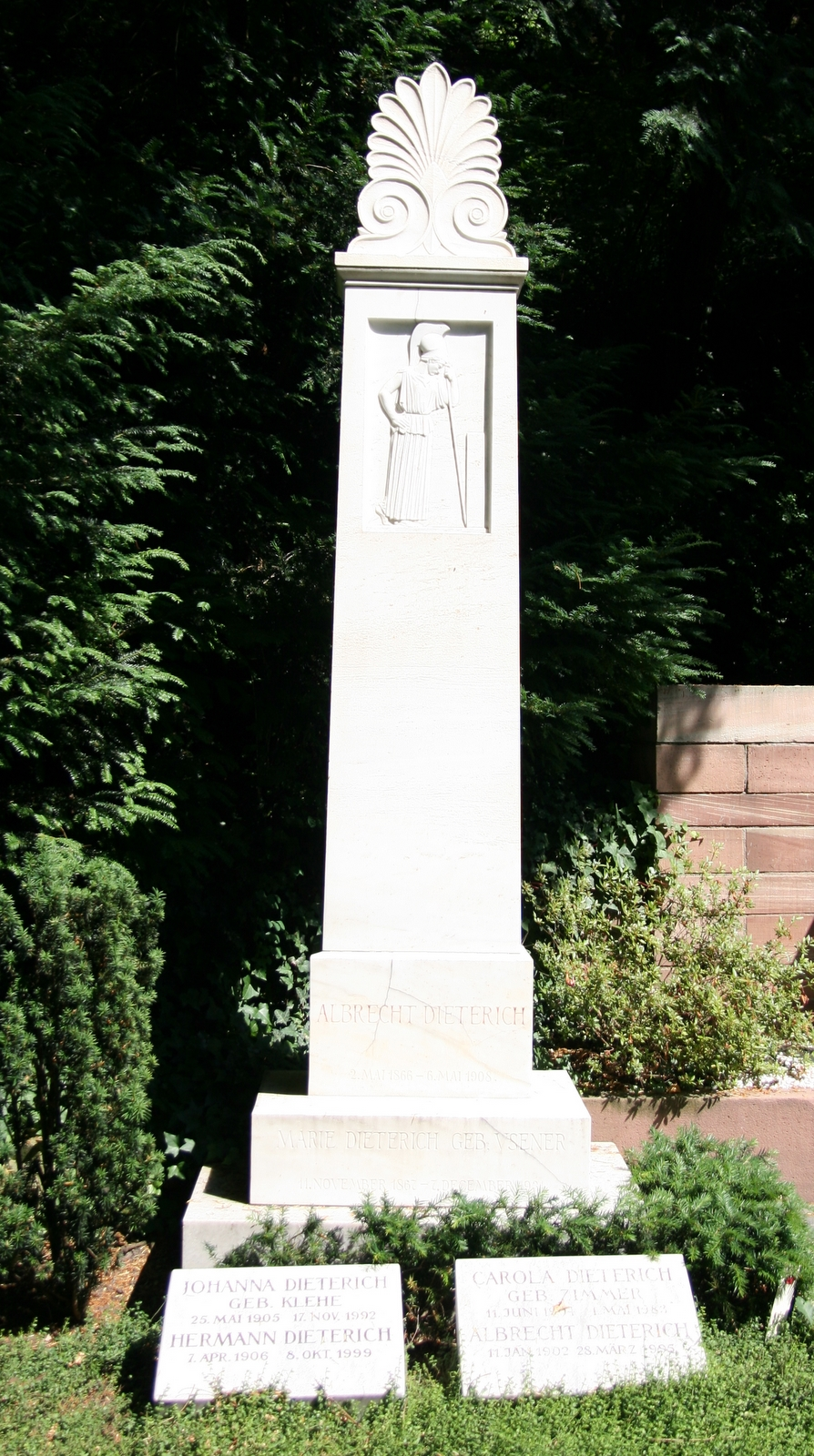
His grave in Heidelberg

In 1895 he returned to Marburg as an associate professor, and two years later succeeded Eduard Schwartz (1858–1940) as chair of classical philology at the University of Giessen. From 1903 till his death in 1908, he was a full professor at the University of Heidelberg. He was working on his magnum opis, the Geschichte des Untergangs der antiken Religion, a detailed critical study of classical religion, but was unable to complete it.

In 1903, he co-founded the study group Eranos with a fellow Marburg student, Gustav Adolf Deissmann. The two, along with Wissowa and Wilhelm Schulze, were part of a daily Tischrunde 'von glücklischter Zusammensetzung', an informal learned society of Classics scholars.

He died at Heidelberg from cerebral apoplexy.

== Ideas ==
Dieterich was notable for identifying the origin & use of manuum vellatio. He notes that the ritual was originally Persian, brought to the West by Alexander the Great, interwoven into the worship of Isis and then seeped into the Roman sphere of influence. Dieterich cites the works of Constantine VII Porphyrogenitus, which noted the ritual being used from Diocletian's time till the Byzantine period.

Dieterich also noted parallels between the myths of the Pythian Dragon, the birth of Apollo to Leto and the Woman of the Apocalypse.

== Works ==
Much of Dieterich's work involved research of traditional beliefs, mythology and religion of the Greco-Roman world. He was the author of an influential work titled "Abraxas: Studien zur Religionsgeschichte des spätern Altertums", a study based on a magical papyri that was housed at the Lateran Museum. In 1903 he published "Eine Mithrasliturgie", in which he proposed that lines 475 – 834 of the Paris Magical Papyrus contained the official liturgy of the Mithras Cult. His theory was met with skepticism and criticized by several scholars in regards to the Mithraic origin of the liturgy. He participated in a long standing debate with Franz Cumont over his Mithraic interpretation of the papyrus. Other significant works by Dieterich include:

- De hymnis Orphicis capitula quinque (Marburg, 1891).
- Nekyia: Beiträge zur Erklärung der neuentdeckten Petrusapokalypse, (1893) – Nekyia; contributions to the explanation of the newly revealed Apocalypse of Peter.
- Die Grabschrift des Aberkios, (1896) – The grave inscriptions of Aberkios.
- Mutter Erde, (1905) – Mother Earth.
- Kleine Schriften, (1911). Richard Wünsch (ed). – Smaller works.
- Pulcinella: pompejanische Wandbilder und römische Satyrspiele (Leipzig, 1897). Comic characters from classical antiquity to contemporary times.
- Archiv fur Religionwissenschaft (edited 1904 with Thomas Achelis, 1905-1908 sole editor)
- Religionsgeschichtliche Versuche und Vorarbeiten (1902-1908)
- Papyri Graecea Magicae: Compiled papyri which were published posthumously in two editions.
