= John the Lydian =

6th-century Byzantine administrator and antiquarian scholar

John the Lydian or John Lydus (Greek: Ἰωάννης Λαυρέντιος ὁ Λυδός; Latin: Ioannes Laurentius Lydus) (AD 491 – c. 565) was a Byzantine administrator and writer. He is considered a key figure in antiquarian studies from the fourth to the sixth century A.D. Although he is a secondary author, his works are significant because they are filled with valuable insights into history, astronomy, astrology, mythology, religion, and language. Additionally, they provide important information on Roman and Byzantine culture, making them worthy of in-depth study.

== Life and career ==
He was born in AD 491 at Philadelphia in Lydia, whence his cognomen "Lydus". At an early age he set out to seek his fortune in Constantinople, and held high court and state offices in the praetorian prefecture of the East under Anastasius and Justinian. Around 543, Lydus was appointed to a chair of Latin language and literature at an institute of higher education of Constantinople. In 552, he lost Justinian's favour and was dismissed. The date of his death is not known, but he was probably alive during the early years of Justin II (reigned 565–578).

== Literary work ==
During his retirement he occupied himself in the compilation of works on the antiquities of Rome, three of which have been preserved:

1. De Ostentis (Gr. Περὶ Διοσημείων), on the origin and progress of the art of divination
2. De Magistratibus reipublicae Romanae (Gr. Περὶ ἀρχῶν τῆς Ῥωμαίων πολιτείας), especially valuable for the administrative details of the time of Justinian; the work has been dated to the 550s by Michael Maas.
3. De Mensibus (Gr. Περὶ τῶν μηνῶν), a history of the different pagan festivals of the year.

The chief value of these books consists in the fact that the author made use of the works (now lost) of old Roman writers on similar subjects. Lydus was also commissioned by Justinian to compose a panegyric on the emperor, and a history of his campaign against Sassanid Persia; but these, as well as some poetical compositions, are lost.

He was interested in gynaecology and embryology and included several related passages in his "De Mensibus", with references to previous authors. His sources are mainly Greek, and two of them are Latin.

== Editions and translations ==
There is an edition of De Ostentis by Curt Wachsmuth (1897), with full account of the authorities in the prolegomena.

There is an edition of De Magistratibus and De Mensibus by Richard Wünsch (1898–1903). See also the essay by CB Hase (the first editor of the De Ostentis) prefixed to I. Bekker's edition of Lydus (1837) in the Bonn Corpus scriptorum hist. Byzantinae.

For De Magistratibus, Wünsch's edition has been superseded by Anastasius C. Bandy's 1983 edition and translation.

See also:

- The Works of Ioannis Lydus, Vols. I–IV (Edwin Mellen Press, 2013). New critical translations of De Mensibus, De Ostentis and De Magistratibus by Anastasius Bandy. Co-edited by Anastasia Bandy, Demetrios J. Constantelos and Craig J. N. de Paulo.
- John the Lydian, De Magistratibus. On the Magistracies of the Roman Constitution. Translated by T. F. Carney. December 1971, Coronado Press.
- John the Lydian, On powers, or, The magistracies of the Roman state / Ioannes Lydus; introduction, critical text, translation, commentary, and indices by Anastasius C. Bandy. Series: Memoirs of the American Philosophical Society, v. 149 ISSN 0065-9738. Philadelphia : American Philosophical Society, 1983, c1982. Greek text, parallel English translation. Based on the Codex Caseolinus.
- Des magistratures de l'état romain. Jean le Lydien. Text, French translation and commentary by Michel Dubuisson, Jacques Schamp. Belles Lettres (2006)
