= Karl Preisendanz =

- Born: 22 July 1883; Ellmendingen
- Died: 26 April 1968 (aged 84); Heidelberg
- Occupations: teacher; librarian; researcher
- Spouses: Lili Martini; Anneliese Preisendanz

Academic background
- Education: Heidelberg University; Ludwig-Maximilians-Universität München

Academic work
- Discipline: philology; papyrology; paleography
- Institutions: Heidelberg University Library
- Notable works: 1928–1931 edition of the Greek Magical Papyri collection

Karl Leberecht Reinhard Preisendanz (22 July 1883 – 26 April 1968) was a German classical philologist, papyrologist, paleographer, and librarian. He created a numbering system and catalogued the Greek Magical Papyri.

== Life ==
Karl Preisendanz studied classical philology, German language and literature, and philosophy at Heidelberg University and the Ludwig-Maximilians-Universität München. After completing his doctorate at Heidelberg University in 1906, he worked as a high school teacher. In addition to teaching, he was involved in library and book publishing and published translations of Greek and Latin authors. As early as 1904, when he was a 21-year-old student in Heidelberg, he published a selection of German adaptations of Greek poetry under the title Hellenische Sänger in deutschen Versen (Hellenic Singers in German Verse). This was followed by four volumes of German translations of Plato and a selection of German translations of Seneca-Auswahl, published by Eugen Diederichs between 1908 and 1910. He was released from teaching duties from 1910 to 1914 to pursue his paleographic work. Karl Preisendanz continued his philological work with several special essays, which culminated in 1911 with the large facsimile edition of the Greek Anthology. His introduction, with its detailed codicological examination of the manuscript, remains fundamental to anthology research, and the anthology accompanied him throughout his life: he was able to publish individual results of these studies time and again. After serving for several months in World War I (1914–1915), he was appointed administrator of the manuscript department of the Baden State Library in Karlsruhe in 1916. In the following decades, he became one of the leading papyrologists and paleographers.

In 1934, Karl Preisendanz, who had joined the NSDAP on 1 May 1933 (membership number 2,316,044), was appointed director of the Baden State Library, succeeding Ferdinand Rieser, who had been dismissed due to Nazi racial laws. In 1935, he moved to the Heidelberg University Library as its chief librarian. He had been a titular professor since 1917, an honorary professor since 1937, and a member of the Heidelberg Academy of Sciences since 1939. In the same year, he founded the Institute of Paleography at Heidelberg University and, from 1941 to 1944, represented Hildebrecht Hommel, professor of classical philology, who had been called up for military service.

In 1945, Preisendanz was dismissed by the American occupying forces as a beneficiary of National Socialism. He was classified as a "follower" in 1947 and reinstated in 1949 as a library councilor and head of the manuscript department of the university library. He retired in 1951 and remained associated with the university and library through his paleographic teaching. He was also editor of the Neue Heidelberger Jahrbücher from 1935 to 1951. In April 1968, he submitted his program for the summer semester to the Philological Seminar, but died on 26 April 1968. Karl Preisendanz would have celebrated his 30th anniversary as a member of the Heidelberg Academy of Sciences that year.

Karl Preisendanz is particularly important to classical studies as the editor of numerous manuscripts and papyri. The main result of his work was the 1928–1931 edition of the Greek Magical Papyri collection, which had been started by Albrecht Dieterich and Richard Wünsch. He was able to add his translations to the Die griechischen Zauberpapyri. The edition was revised after his death (2nd improved edition, 1973–1974) and most recently reprinted in 2001. His comprehensive presentation of Papyrusfunde und Papyrusforschung, papyrology, papyrus finds, and papyrus research was published in 1933 by Hiersemann Verlag. In his later years, Karl Preisendanz also devoted himself to modern literature and published the first complete edition of the works of Emanuel von Bodman (Reclam-Verlag, 1951–1960). His book Liselotte von der Pfalz. Briefe (Insel-Bücherei 352/2) was published by Insel Verlag in 1941.

Karl Preisendanz had two children and was married to Anneliese Preisendanz, his second wife, with whom he lived in Heidelberg until his death.

== Works ==
- Preisendanz, Karl (1933). Papyrusfunde und Papyrusforschung. Leipzig: Hiersemann.
- Preisendanz, Karl; et al. (Badische Landesbibliothek Karlsruhe) (1970). Die Handschriften der Badischen Landesbibliothek in Karlsruhe. Die Karlsruher Handschriften (in German). Vol. 8. Wiesbaden: Otto Harrassowitz Verlag. ISBN 9783447013888.
- Preisendanz, Karl (1974). Papyri Graecae magicae: Die griechischen Zauberpapyri. Sammlung wissenschaftlicher Commentare. Vol. 1 (2 ed.). B. G. Teubner.
