= Günther Klaffenbach =

German epigraphist (1890–1972)

Günther Klaffenbach (20 June 1890 – 3 March 1972) was a German epigraphist. He was an editor of Inscriptiones Graecae from 1929, in succession to Friedrich Hiller von Gaertringen.
