= Inscriptiones Graecae =

German academic project

The Inscriptiones Graecae (IG), Latin for Greek inscriptions, is an academic project originally begun by the Prussian Academy of Science, and today continued by its successor organisation, the Berlin-Brandenburg Academy of Sciences and Humanities. Its aim is to collect and publish all known ancient inscriptions from the mainland and islands of Greece.

The project was designed as a continuation of the Corpus Inscriptionum Graecarum (Corpus of Greek Inscriptions, abbreviated CIG) published by August Böckh between 1825 and 1860, and as a parallel to the Corpus Inscriptionum Latinarum (Corpus of Latin Inscriptions) founded by Theodor Mommsen in 1847. From 1860 to 1902, it was directed by Adolf Kirchhoff. From 1902 to 1931, Ulrich von Wilamowitz-Moellendorff was in control of the project; he reorganised and re-energised the IG, turning it into one of the most important series for the publication of source material in Classical studies.

After the Second World War, the project suffered from a lack of financial and public support. It came to a temporary halt in 1972, but was revived by the newly reformed Berlin-Brandenburg Academy in 1994.

So far, 49 fascicles have been published, some of them in several editions. The preparation of each individual volume is entrusted to external scholars, though the Berlin Academy retains the final editing rights. The Academy also maintains a collection of "squeezes" (paper copies) of Greek inscriptions. The project is currently directed by Peter Funke. Editors of previous volumes include Wilhelm Dittenberger, Friedrich Hiller von Gaertringen, Johannes Kirchner and Günther Klaffenbach.

All editorial texts are published in Latin, a fact that is occasionally criticised due to limited use of Latin and hence the extra effort required for both writers and editors. The inscriptions were published without translation, but German translations for all volumes since 2012 are available on the IG website.

== List of Volumes and Parts ==
- IG I^{2} Inscriptiones Graecae I: Inscriptiones Atticae Euclidis anno (403/2) anteriores (Attic Inscriptions before the year of Eucleides [403/2]), 2nd edn., ed. Friedrich Hiller von Gaertringen. Berlin 1924.
- IG I^{3} Inscriptiones Graecae I: Inscriptiones Atticae Euclidis anno anteriores (Attic Inscriptions before the year of Eucleides). 3rd edn. Berlin 1981, 1994. Fasc. 1, ed. David Lewis, Decreta et tabulae magistratuum (Decrees and Lists of Magistrates; nos. 1-500); fasc. 2, ed. David Lewis and Lilian Jeffery, Dedicationes. Catalogi. Termini. Tituli sepulcrales. Varia. Tituli Attici extra Atticam reperti. Addenda (Dedications, Catalogues, Boundary Stones, Tombstones, Miscellaneous, Attic inscriptions found outside Attica; nos. 501-1517).
- IG II Inscriptiones Atticae aetatis quae est inter Euclidis annum et Augusti tempora (Attic Inscriptions from the period between the year of Eucleides and the time of Augustus), ed. Ulrich Koehler. Parts I-V. Berlin 1877-1895.
- IG III Inscriptiones Atticae aetatis romanae (Attic Inscriptions of the Roman Period), ed. Wilhelm Dittenberger. Parts I-II. Berlin 1878-1882.
- IG III App. Inscriptiones Graecae III, Appendix: Defixionum Tabellae (Appendix: Curse tablets), ed. Richard Wuensch. Berlin 1897.
- IG II^{2} Inscriptiones Graecae II et III: Inscriptiones Atticae Euclidis anno posteriores (Attic Inscriptions after the year of Eucleides), 2nd edn., Parts I-III, ed. Johannes Kirchner. Berlin 1913-1940. — Part I, 1-2 (1913–1916) = Decrees and Sacred Laws (Nos. 1-1369); Part II, 1-2 (1927–1931) = Records of Magistrates and Catalogues (Nos. 1370-2788); Part III, 1 (1935) = Dedications and Honorary Inscriptions (Nos. 2789-5219); Part III, 2 (1940) = Funerary Inscriptions (Nos. 5220-13247). — Part V, Inscriptiones Atticae aetatis quae est inter Herulorum incursionem et Imp. Mauricii tempora (Attic Inscriptions from the period between the invasion of the Heruls and the time of Emperor Maurice, ed. Ericus Sironen. Berlin 2008. (Nos. 13248-13690) [Texts in part V adapted from an electronic copy provided by Klaus Hallof, director of the Inscriptiones Graecae program.]
- IG II/III^{3} Inscriptiones Graecae II et III: Inscriptiones Atticae Euclidis anno posteriores (Attic Inscriptions after the year of Eucleides), 3rd edn. Berlin 2012-. Part I, Leges et decreta (Laws and Decrees). Fasc. 2, Leges et decreta annorum 352/1-322/1 (Laws and Decrees of the years 352/1-322/1), ed. Stephen D. Lambert. Berlin, 2012. (Nos. 292-386); fasc. 4, Leges et decreta annorum 300/299-230/29 (Laws and Decrees of the Years 300/299-230/29 BC), ed. M. J. Osborne and S. G. Byrne (300/299-230/29 BC). Berlin, 2014 (Nos. 844-1134); fasc. 5, Leges et decreta annorum 229/8-168/7 (Laws and Decrees of the Years 229/8-168/7), ed. Voula N. Bardani and Stephen V. Tracy. Berlin, 2012. (Nos. 1135-1461).
- IG IV Inscriptiones Graecae IV = Inscriptiones graecae Aeginae, Pityonesi, Cecryphaliae, Argolidis (Greek Inscriptions of Aegina, Pityonesus, Cecryphalia, the Argolid), ed. Max Fraenkel. «Corpus inscriptionum graecarum Peloponnesi et insularum vicinarum», 1. Berlin 1902.
- IG IV^{2},1 Inscriptiones Graecae, IV. Inscriptiones Argolidis (Inscriptions of the Argolid). 2nd edn. Fasc. 1, Inscriptiones Epidauri, ed. Friedrich Hiller von Gaertringen. Berlin 1929.
- IG V,1 Inscriptiones Graecae, V,1. Inscriptiones Laconiae et Messeniae (Inscriptions of Laconia and Messenia, ed. Walther Kolbe. Berlin 1913.
- IG V,2 Inscriptiones Graecae, V,2. Inscriptiones Arcadiae (Inscriptions of Arcadia), ed. Friedrich Hiller von Gaertringen. Berlin 1913.
- IG VII Inscriptiones Graecae, VII. Inscriptiones Megaridis, Oropiae, Boeotiae (Inscriptions of the Megarid, Oropus, Boeotia), ed. Wilhelm Dittenberger. Berlin 1892.
- IG IX,1 Inscriptiones Graecae IX,1. Inscriptiones Phocidis, Locridis, Aetoliae, Acarnaniae, insularum maris Ionii (Inscriptions of Phocis, Locris, Aetolia, Acarnania, the Ionian islands, ed. Wilhelm Dittenberger. Berlin 1897.
- IG IX,1^{2} Inscriptiones Graecae IX,1. 2nd edn., ed. Günther Klaffenbach. Berlin 1932-1968. — Fasc. 1, Inscriptiones Aetoliae (Inscriptions of Aetolia; 1932); fasc. 2, Inscriptiones Acarnaniae (Inscriptions of Acarnania; 1957); fasc. 3, Inscriptiones Locridis occidentalis (Inscriptions of West Locris; 1968).
- IG IX,2 Inscriptiones Graecae, IX,2. Inscriptiones Thessaliae (Inscriptions of Thessaly), ed. Otto Kern. Berlin 1908.
- IG X,2 1 Inscriptiones Graecae, X: Inscriptiones Epiri, Macedoniae, Thraciae, Scythiae (Inscriptions of Epirus, Macedonia, Thrace, Scythia). Pars II, fasc. 1: Inscriptiones Thessalonicae et viciniae (Inscriptions of Thessalonica and nearby), ed. Charles Edson. Berlin 1972.
- IG X,2 2 Inscriptiones Graecae, X: Inscriptiones Epiri, Macedoniae, Thraciae, Scythiae. Pars II, fasc. 2: Inscriptiones Macedoniae septentrionalis. Sectio prima: Inscriptiones Lyncestidis, Heracleae, Pelagoniae, Derriopi, Lychnidi (Inscriptions of Northern Macedonia. Section 1: Inscriptions of Lyncestis, Heraclea, Pelagonia, Derriopus, Lychnidus), ed. Fanula Papazoglu, Milena Milin, Marijana Ricl, adiuvante Klaus Hallof. Berlin 1999.
- IG XI,2 Inscriptiones Graecae XI. Inscriptiones Deli (Inscriptions of Delos), fasc. 2, ed. Félix Durrbach. Berlin 1912. Nos. 105-289.
- IG XI,4 Inscriptiones Graecae XI. Inscriptiones Deli, fasc. 4, ed. Pierre Roussel. Berlin 1914. Nos. 510-1349.
- IG XII Suppl. Inscriptiones Graecae, XII. Supplementum, ed. F. Hiller von Gaertringen. Berlin 1939. Addenda to IG XII,2-3, 5, and 7-9.
- IG XII,1 Inscriptiones Graecae, XII. Inscriptiones insularum maris Aegaei praeter Delum (inscriptions of the Aegean islands aside from Delos), 1. Inscriptiones Rhodi, Chalces, Carpathi cum Saro, Casi (Inscriptions of Rhodes, Chalke, Carpathus with Saria, Kasos), ed. Friedrich Hiller von Gaertringen. Berlin 1895.
- IG XII,2 Inscriptiones Graecae, XII. Inscriptiones insularum maris Aegaei praeter Delum, 2. Inscriptiones Lesbi, Nesi, Tenedi (Inscriptions of Lesbos, Nesos, Tenedos), ed. William R. Paton. Berlin 1899.
- IG XII,3 Inscriptiones Graecae, XII. Inscriptiones insularum maris Aegaei praeter Delum, 3. Inscriptiones Symes, Teutlussae, Teli, Nisyri, Astypalaeae, Anaphes, Therae et Therasiae, Pholegandri, Meli, Cimoli (Inscriptions of Syme, Teutlyssa, Telos, Nisyros, Astypalaea, Anaphe, Thera and Therasia, Pholegandros, Melos, Kimolos), ed. Friedrich Hiller von Gaertringen. Berlin 1898. — With: Inscriptiones Graecae, XII,3. Supplementum (Supplement), ed. Friedrich Hiller von Gaertringen. Berlin 1904.
- IG XII,5 Inscriptiones Graecae XII,5. Inscriptiones Cycladum (Inscriptions of the Cyclades), ed. Friedrich Hiller von Gaertringen. 2 vols. Berlin 1903-1909. — Ios, Sikinos, Naxos, Paros, Oliaros, Siphnos, Seriphos, Kythnos, Keos, Gyaros, Syros, Andros and Tenos.
- IG XII,6 Inscriptiones Graecae, XII, 6. Inscriptiones Chii et Sami cum Corassiis Icariaque (Inscriptions of Chios and Samos with the Korassioi, and Ikaria). — Pars I. Inscriptiones Sami Insulae. Decreta. Epistulae, sententiae, edicta imperatoria. Leges. Catalogi. Tituli Atheniensium. Tituli honorarii. Tituli operum publicorum. Inscriptiones ararum (Inscriptions of the Island of Samos. Decrees, letters, judgments, imperial edicts, laws, catalogues, Athenian inscriptions, honorific inscriptions, inscriptions of public buildings, inscriptions of altars; nos. 1-536), ed. Klaus Hallof. — Pars II. Inscriptiones Sami insulae. Dedicationes. Tituli sepulcrales. Tituli Christiani, Byzantini, Iudaei. Varia. Tituli graphio incisi. Incerta. Tituli Alieni. Inscriptiones Corassiarum (Inscriptions of the Island of Samos. Dedications, tombstones, Christian, Byzantine, and Jewish inscriptions, inscriptions carved with a sharp object. Inscriptions of the Corassian islands; nos. 537-1216), ed. Klaus Hallof. Inscriptiones Icariae insulae (Inscriptions of the island of Ikaria; nos. 1217-1292), ed. Angelos P. Matthaiou. Berlin and New York 2000, 2003.
- IG XII,7 Inscriptiones Graecae XII,7. Inscriptiones Amorgi et insularum vicinarum (Inscriptions of Amorgos and neighbouring islands), ed. Jules Delamarre. Berlin 1908.
- IG XII,8 Inscriptiones Graecae XII,8. Inscriptiones insularum maris Thracici (Inscriptions of the islands off Thrace), ed. Carl Friedrich. Berlin 1909. — Lemnos, Imbros, Samothrace, Thasos, Skiathos (etc.) and Skyros.
- IG XII,9 Inscriptiones Graecae XII,9. Inscriptiones Euboeae insulae (Inscriptions of the island of Euboea, ed. Erich Ziebarth. Berlin 1915.
- IG XIV Inscriptiones Graecae, XIV. Inscriptiones Siciliae et Italiae, additis Galliae, Hispaniae, Britanniae, Germaniae inscriptionibus (Inscriptions of Sicily and Italy, as well as inscriptions in Gaul, Hispania, Britannia, Germania), ed. Georg Kaibel. Berlin 1890.

== See also ==
- Epigraphy§Greek Inscriptions
- Supplementum Epigraphicum Graecum

== Bibliography ==
- Reinhold Merkelbach, "Überlegungen zur Fortführung der Inscriptiones Graecae", Zeitschrift für Papyrologie und Epigraphik, 117 (1997), pp. 297–303 PDF
- Reinhold Merkelbach, "Nochmals Inscriptiones Graecae", Zeitschrift für Papyrologie und Epigraphik, 122 (1998), pp. 293–299 PDF
  (Both articles express criticism of the continuation of IG in its traditional shape)
