= Alby Kirchner =

Australian rules footballer

Personal information
- Full name: Albert Edward Lester Kirchner
- Nicknames: Curly, Ted
- Born: 7 January 1888; North Melbourne, Victoria
- Died: 23 January 1942 (aged 54); Caulfield, Victoria
- Position: Defender

Playing career^{1}
Years	Club	Games (Goals)
1910	South Melbourne	6 (0)
1911–1913	Sturt	36 (2)
- ^{1} Playing statistics correct to the end of 1913.

Albert Edward Lester Kirchner (7 January 1888 – 23 January 1942) was an Australian rules footballer who played with South Melbourne in the Victorian Football League (VFL) and Sturt in the South Australian Football League (SAFL).
