= Mithras Liturgy =

Text from the Great Magical Papyrus of Paris

The "Mithras Liturgy" is a text from the Great Magical Papyrus of Paris, part of the Greek Magical Papyri, numbered PGM IV.475–829. Albrecht Dieterich, the first translator of the text in 1903, coined the name it is known by today, based on the invocation of Helios Mithras (Ἥλιοϲ Μίθραϲ) as the god who will provide the initiate with a revelation of immortality. The text is generally considered to be a product of the religious syncretism characteristic of the Hellenistic and Roman Imperial era, as were the Mithraic mysteries themselves. Some scholars have argued that the text has no direct connection to Mithraic ritual practice; others consider it an authentic reflection of Mithraic liturgy, or view it as Mithraic material reworked for the syncretic tradition of magic and esotericism.

The codex containing the text was acquired by the Bibliothèque Nationale in 1857. It is thought to date to the early 4th century AD, though Dieterich proposed a date of composition as early as 100–150 AD. Its likely provenance in Egypt, where evidence of the Mithraic cult is rare, presents a major challenge to the possibility of it being an original Mithraic liturgy.

== Structure ==
Marvin Meyer divides the Mithras Liturgy into two sections: Lines 475–750 are a liturgy for the mystic ascent of the soul through seven stages, and 751–834 provide instructions on how to enact the liturgy.

The text begins by invoking Providence (Pronoia) and Psyche ("Soul") or in other readings Tyche. The speaker of the invocation announces that he is writing down the mysteries to offer instruction and not for gain, and that he seeks a revelation of the universe and immortality guided by an archangelos (ἀρχάγγελος, "high messenger") of Helios Mithras (lines 475–485).

=== Ascent ===
The ascent through seven grades is viewed by Meyer as representing Mithraic initiation, but it also bears a more general resemblance to the ascent of the initiate in theurgy, with parallels in fragments from the Chaldaean Oracles.

==== 1. Four Elements ====
The speaker invokes the four classical primordial elements, punctuated by voces magicae, magical sounds, in the following sequence:

- PPP SSS PHR[E], a popping and hissing sound characteristic of incantations
- pneuma (wind, breath, spirit)
- MMM
- fire
- ĒY ĒIA EĒ
- water
- ŌŌŌ AAA EEE
- earth
- YĒ YŌĒ

These elements he refers to as "first origin of my origin" from which his "complete body" is made. He identifies himself by name, and by the name of his mother. The soul's encounter with the four elements is rehearsed as both generation and regeneration (lines 485–537).

==== 2. Lower powers of air ====
At this level (lines 537–585), the revelation-seeker is supposed to breathe deeply and feel himself lifted up, as if in midair, hearing and seeing nothing of mortal beings on earth. He is promised to see instead the divine order of the "visible gods" rising and setting. Ritual silence is prescribed, followed by another sequence of hissing, popping, and thirteen magic words: "Then you will see the gods looking graciously upon you and no longer rushing at you, but rather going about in their own order of affairs." After a shocking crash of thunder, another admonition of silence, and a magic incantation, the disk of the sun is to open and issue five-pointed stars. The eyes are to be closed for the following prayer.

==== 3. Aion and powers ====
In this prayer (lines 585–628), the speaker again names himself and his mother, followed by an extensive list of translatable epithets such as "Light-maker" and "Fire-driver" interspersed with magic names. These are "planetary guardians of the gates of heaven". Among the invocations are Aion and Iao. An extensive series of vowels are pronounced "with fire and spirit." After thunder and a feeling of physical agitation, another series of magic words elicits a vision of Helios.

==== 4. Helios ====
Helios is described as "a youthful god, beautiful in appearance, with fiery hair, and in a white tunic and a scarlet cloak, and wearing a fiery crown." He is to be given the "fire greeting" (lines 628–657), and asked for protection while kissing phylacteries.

==== 5. Seven Tychai ====
The celestial doors are thrown open to reveal seven virgins dressed in linen and with faces of asps, an element identified as Egyptian. They carry golden wands, and are to be hailed individually (lines 657–672).

==== 6. Seven Pole-Lords ====
Next to come forth are the seven Pole-Lords, wearing linen loincloths and with faces of bulls. They have seven gold diadems, and are also to be hailed individually by name. These have powers of thunder, lightning, and earthquakes, as well as the capacity to grant physical health, good eyesight and hearing, and calmness (lines 673–692). The two groups of seven, female and male, are both depicted in an Egyptian manner and represent the "region of the fixed stars."

==== 7. Highest god ====
In the midst of lightning and tremors of the earth, the highest god appears, youthful and bright in appearance, wearing a white tunic, a golden crown, and trousers. He holds the shoulder of a bull in what seems to be an astronomical reference (lines 696–724). His eyes project lightning bolts, and stars issue from his body. The instructions are to "make a long bellowing sound, straining your belly, that you may excite the five senses; bellow long until out of breath, and again kiss the phylacteries."

The encounter with the highest god is intended to result in divine revelation and apathanatismos, a technical term for the temporary achieving of a state of immortality.

=== Enactment and use ===
Lines 751–834 are instructions on how to enact the liturgy. The practitioner is warned not to misuse the mysterion (lines 724–834), and is given instructions on the preparation of magical accoutrements: a sun scarab ointment (751–778), the herb kentritis (778–792), and the protective phylacteries for the ritual (813–819). The section also offers some additional information and incantations.

== Magic context ==
In Book IV of the Greek Magical Papyri in which the "Mithras Liturgy" occurs, lines 1–25 are a spell calling on Egyptian and Jewish powers in order to obtain information. Lines 1127–1164 are a spell for exorcising a demon, using Coptic words of Christian origin, with instructions for preparing an amulet. Lines 1716–1870 are headed "Sword of Dardanos" and is a love spell.

The Mithras Liturgy shares several elements found widely in magic as practiced in the Greco-Roman world, which drew on or claimed the authority of Egyptian religion and magic. These include the preparation of amulets and ointments, the timing of rituals based on astronomical phenomena or horoscopes, and the manipulation of breath and speech. Vocalizations include popping and hissing sounds for onomatopoeia, variations on the sequence of Greek vowels, glossolalia, and words that are untranslatable but seem to derive from or are intended to sound like Egyptian, Greek and other languages.

The "Mithras Liturgy" is the only text in Betz's collection of the Greek Magical Papyri that involves a request for immortality. It is an example of the difficulty in distinguishing between "magic" and "religion" in the ancient world.

== Questions of Mithraic content ==
The name "the Mithras liturgy" was given to it by Dieterich, who dedicated the edition to Franz Cumont. But Cumont could not see the text as being Mithraic in origin. Gee believes that its origins should be sought in this context, while Hans Dieter Betz thinks rather of a wandering philosophical origin.

Classicist Johan C. Thom notes that opinions regarding the context of the text differ, for example, Mithraism or another mystery cult, ancient magic, the Egyptian cult regarding the dead, or theurgy. Mithraic scholars such as Cumont, Ulrich von Wilamowitz-Moellendorff, Martin P. Nilsson, and Walter Burkert do not identify the text as a Mithraic liturgy. Cumont argued that the text lacked Mithraic eschatology, the Mithraic doctrine of the passage of the soul through the seven planetary spheres, and Mithras as a guide in the ascension.

Betz believes that the Mithras Liturgy is a product at the meeting-point of Greek, Egyptian, and Mithraic traditions, finally identifying the central 'ascent' section as a product of early Hermeticism. Richard Gordon, however, doubts that Hermeticism influenced the text.

Marvin Meyer is certain that the text has connections to Mithraism and believes that it "contributes a great deal to the study of magic, miracle, and ritual in religions in antiquity and late antiquity, including Christianity, and the stories of miracles attributed to Jesus and others may profitably be studied with texts like the Mithras Liturgy at hand."

== See also ==
- Magic in the Graeco-Roman world
