= Kirchner v Venus =

English law case on the nature of freight

Kirchner v Venus (1859) is an English Law case precedent that defined freight as "the reward payable to the carrier of for the safe carriage and delivery of goods". It is a key decision in the history of ship owners lien for freight. The case was an action brought in trover for the release of goods being held in lien for failure to pay. It reversed the findings of the Supreme Court of New South Wales.

== Facts of the case ==
The respondents were having seven shipments sent by Kirchner from Liverpool, England to Sydney, Australia. The customer was declared bankrupt before the goods arrived and failed to pay. The shipping firm sought a lien of £317 16s 4d on the goods to enforce payment.

== Findings ==
Stephens CJ found against the ship owners saying "A party has no right to claim possession of a chattel inconsistent with the terms of the contract".

The decision also found that where the parties make specific reference to payment that is not freight the question as to whether a lien exists or not is depended on the terms in the contract and the court can not assume one that is not in the contract.
