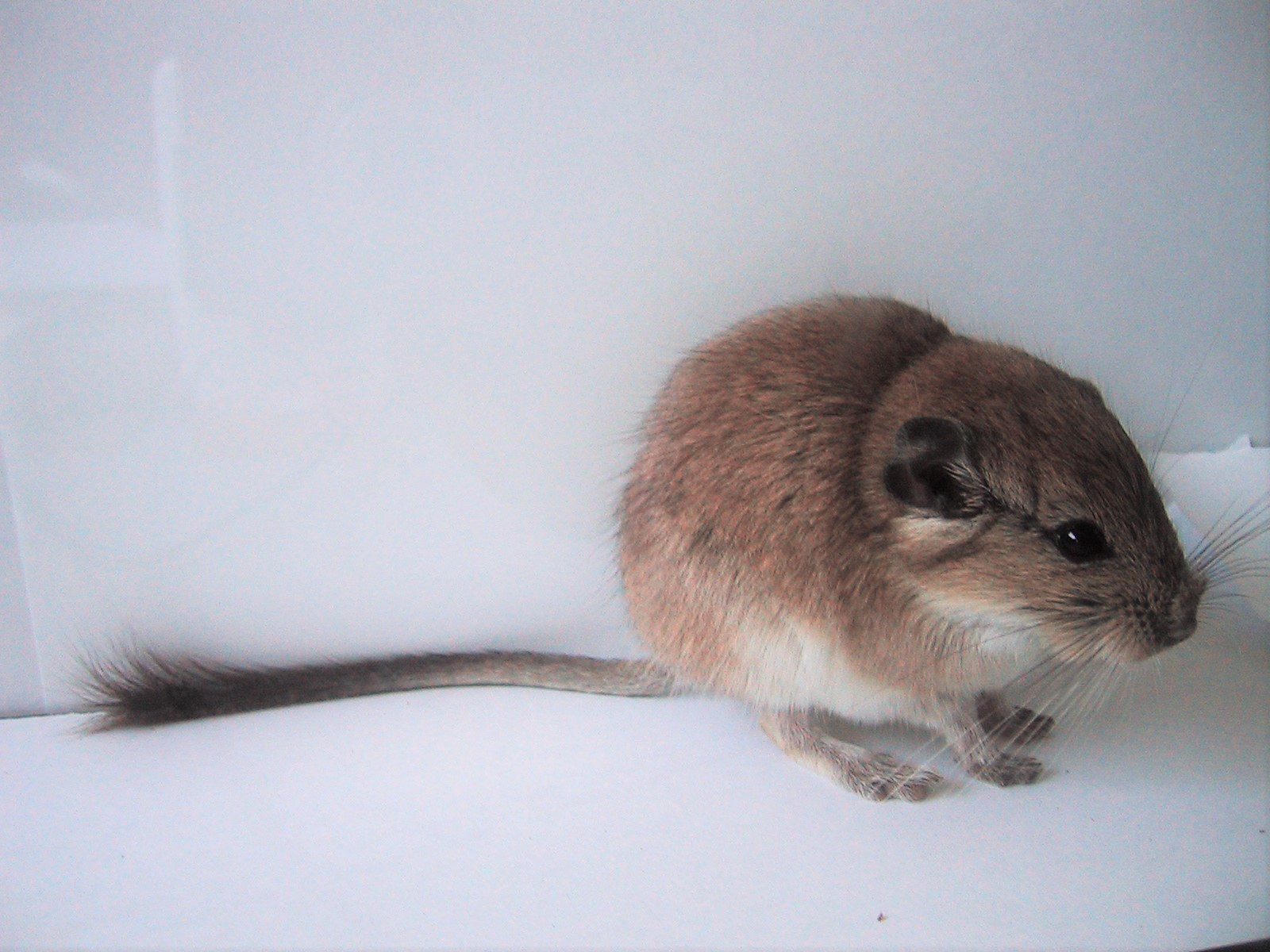

Conservation status
- Near Threatened (IUCN 3.1)

Scientific classification
- Kingdom: Animalia
- Phylum: Chordata
- Class: Mammalia
- Infraclass: Placentalia
- Order: Rodentia
- Family: Octodontidae
- Genus: Tympanoctomys
- Species: T. barrerae

Binomial name
- Tympanoctomys barrerae (B. Lawrence, 1941)
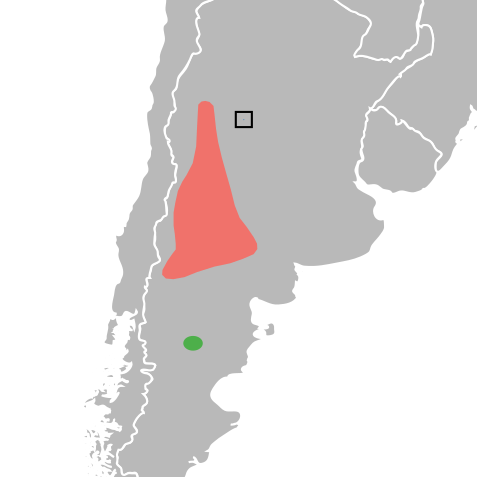
- Tympanoctomys distribution T. barrerae in red

= Plains viscacha rat =

Species of rodent

The plains viscacha rat, plains vizcacha rat, red viscacha rat, or red vizcacha rat (Tympanoctomys barrerae) is a species of rodent in the family Octodontidae native to Argentina. It is one of three species in the genus Tympanoctomys.

== Description ==
The plains viscacha rat is a moderately-sized rat, with a large head, long tail, and short ears. Adults measure about 13 cm (5.1 in) in total length, with a 15 cm (5.9 in) tail, and weigh an average of 90 g (3.2 oz), with males being slightly larger than females. The rat has buff-yellow fur with white underparts, fading to dark brown at the tip of the tail.

== Distribution and habitat ==
The plains viscacha rat is endemic to central western Argentina, where it has a fragmented range in Mendoza Province and western La Pampa. Its natural habitat is desert scrubland, dunes and salt flats, between 300 and 1,400 m (980 and 4,590 ft). There are no recognised subspecies.

The species is threatened by destruction of its fragmented and restricted habitat.

== Biology and behaviour ==
Plains viscacha rats are solitary, and nocturnal. They construct complex burrow systems within large artificial mounds. Typical mounds are 13.6 by 8.7 m (45 by 29 ft) across, and 1.25 m (4 ft 1 in) in height, and have an average of 23 burrow entrances. Within the mound, the burrow system has up to three levels and contains numerous chambers and dead-end tunnels.

The large burrow system, along with the food and fecal material deposited by the rodents, creates refugia with a stabilized and humid microclimate that are vital for other plants, invertebrates, and vertebrates.

The rats are herbivorous, feeding primarily on halophytic vegetation, such as Atriplex and Suaeda, although they will occasionally eat other plants such as grass. The rats scrape off and discard salt from the leaves of Atriplex saltbushes with their teeth and bristles around their mouths before eating them. Although this reduces their salt intake, they still produce highly concentrated urine to help maintain their water balance.

The young are born blind, and weighing about 4 g (0.14 oz). Their eyes open at about six days, and they begin to take solid food at ten days.

== Genetics ==
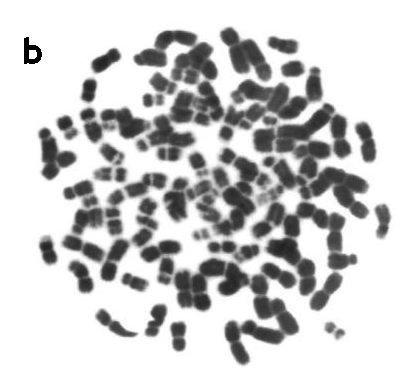
Plains viscacha rat chromosomes

This species of rodent has (as of 2023) the third highest number of chromosomes of any known mammal (2n = 102), behind the tree pangolin (2n = 113/114) and the Bolivian bamboo rat (2n = 118).

It was described as the first known tetraploid (4x = 2n) mammal, thought to have arisen by hybridization and chromosome doubling from an ancestor (very possibly closely related to the mountain vizcacha rat, Octomys mimax, chromosome count 2x = 2n = 56). Some later studies have cast doubt on its tetraploid nature, while others have reasserted it. The doubling of its chromosome number was presumably by errors in mitosis or meiosis within the animal's reproductive organs. A comparison of the chromosomes of the plains viscacha rat and the mountain viscacha rat suggested that the chromosomes of the plains viscacha rat increased relatively rapidly (in evolutionary terms) due to a diverse set of highly repetitive elements. The animal's spermatozoa are roughly twice normal size, thought to be by virtue of having twice as many sets of chromosomes.
