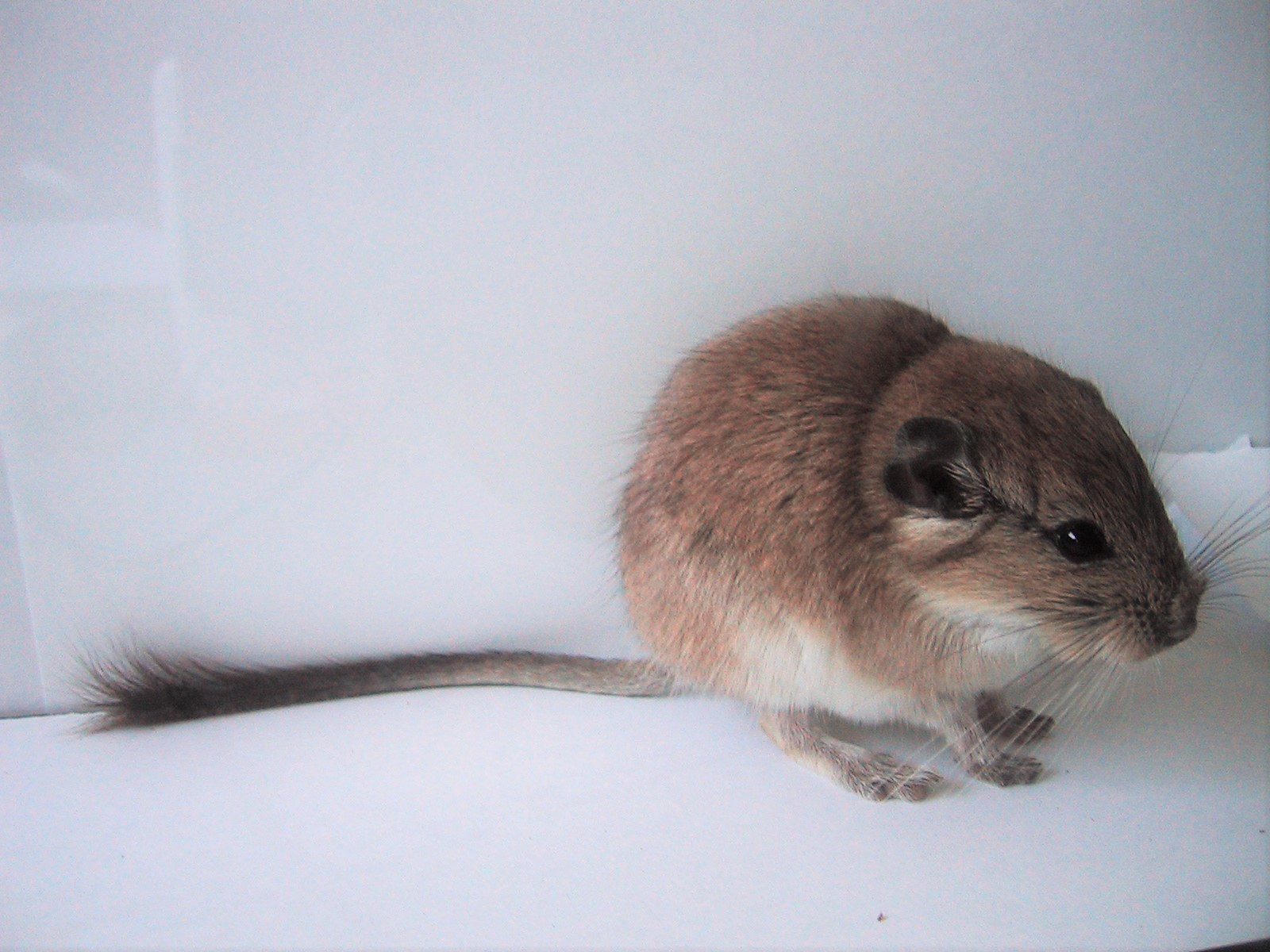
- Plains viscacha rat, Tympanoctomys barrerae

Scientific classification
- Kingdom: Animalia
- Phylum: Chordata
- Class: Mammalia
- Infraclass: Placentalia
- Order: Rodentia
- Family: Octodontidae
- Genus: Tympanoctomys; Yepes, 1942

Type species
- Octomys barrerae B. Lawrence, 1941

Species
- T. barrerae (B. Lawrence, 1941); T. kirchnerorum Teta et al., 2014; T. loschalchalerosorum Mares, Braun, Barquez & Diaz, 2000 †T. cordubensis (Ameghino, 1889)
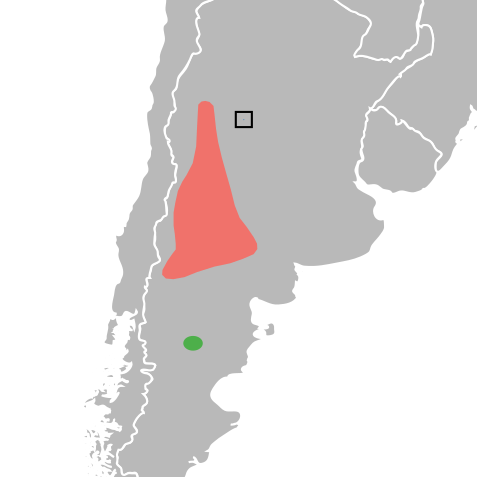
- Tympanoctomys distribution T. barrerae in red, T. kirchnerorum in green, T. loschalchalerosorum in blue (in box)

= Tympanoctomys =

Genus of rodents

Tympanoctomys is a genus of rodent in the family Octodontidae. There are three extant species in the genus: T. barrerae, T. kirchnerorum and T. loschalchalerosorum. T. loschalchalerosorum was formerly considered to be monotypic within the genus Salinoctomys, but has been shown by genetic analysis to nest within the variation of T. barrerae.

All species are endemic to central western Argentina, where the genus has a fragmented range. Their natural habitat is desert scrubland, dunes and salt flats, where they eat halophyte plants. They are solitary, nocturnal rodents that construct large mounds with complex burrows.
