= Russ Kirchner Jr. =

American businessman

- Born: United States
- Occupations: Businessman; Metallurgist; Inventor
- Employer: Haynes International
- Known for: Founding High Performance Alloys

Russell W. Kirchner Jr. is an American businessman, metallurgist, and inventor. He founded High Performance Alloys and served as its president from 1984 to 2009.

== Career ==
Kirchner began his career as a metallurgist and worked with the Union Carbide/Cabot Stellite Division, now known as Haynes International, for 18 years. During this time, he obtained several patents and played an instrumental role in the development of Hastelloy C-276.

In 1984, Kirchner founded High Performance Alloys. The company was established during an economic downturn and initially focused on distributing sawed bars and plate capabilities. However, by the late 1980s, it had transitioned to manufacturing plates, sheets, bars, and forgings.

After 25 years as president of High Performance Alloys, Kirchner retired in 2009.

== Personal life ==
Kirchner married Cella on May 27, 1966. After the birth of their first son, they moved to Greentown, Indiana, where they raised their three sons. However, from 1974 to 1977, the family lived in Belgium before returning to Indiana.
