= Friedrich Hiller von Gaertringen =

German classical scholar (1864–1947)

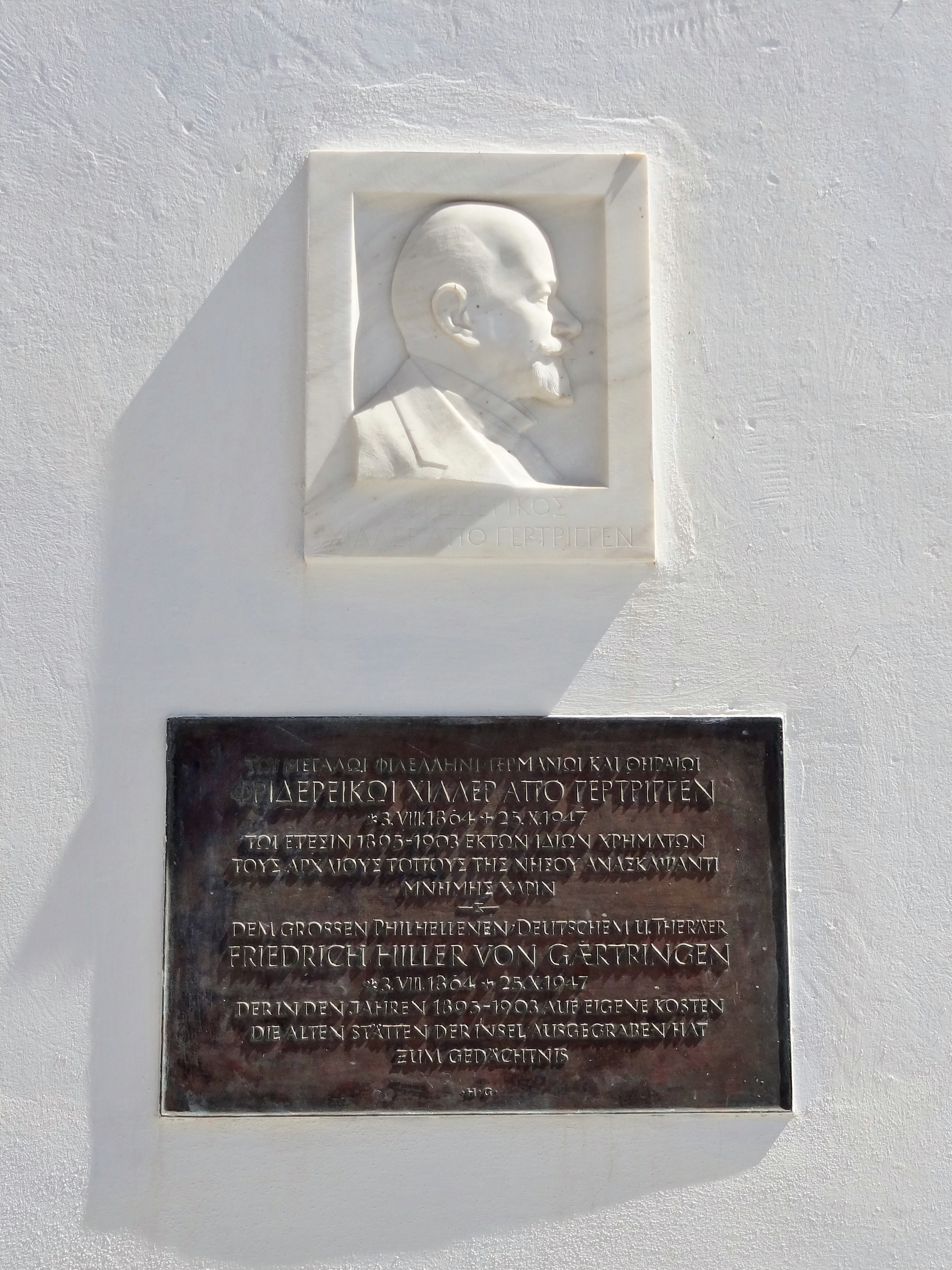
- Plaque dedicated to Friedrich Hiller von Gaertringen in Fira, Santorini.
- Born: 3 August 1864; Berlin, Kingdom of Prussia
- Died: 25 October 1947 (aged 83); Thurnau, Germany

Friedrich Hiller von Gaertringen (3 August 1864 – 25 October 1947) was a German archeologist and philologist, a specialist in Greek epigraphy.

== Life ==
Hiller von Gaertringen was the son of the Prussian army officer Rudolf Hiller von Gaertringen (1837–1877) and Helene Luise Kramsta (1842–1872). He studied ancient history, first with Alfred von Gutschmid at Tübingen, then with Theodor Mommsen in Berlin. After receiving his Ph.D. in 1886, he continued at Göttingen with Ulrich von Wilamowitz-Moellendorff.

He participated in the excavation at Magnesia on the Maeander under the leadership of Carl Humann in 1890 and became a corresponding member of the German Archaeological Institute in 1892. From 1896 to 1902, he carried out excavations on Thera, with substantial support from Paul Wilski. In 1904, he became a member of the Prussian Academy of Sciences.

He collaborated with Mommsen on Inscriptiones Graecae, the corpus of Greek inscriptions from 1893 onwards. In total, he produced nine volumes for the series between 1895 and 1939, mostly dealing with inscriptions from the Aegean islands. Most of these volumes have not been superseded. He also produced a new edition of the Sylloge inscriptionum Graecarum (SIG) begun by Wilhelm Dittenberger and the first edition of the inscriptions of Priene. From 1917 to 1933, he was honorary professor of Greek epigraphy at the University of Berlin.

In 1905, Hiller von Gaertringen married Dorothea von Wilamowitz-Moellendorff (1879-1972), oldest daughter of his former teacher and granddaughter of his former teacher Theodor Mommsen. His personal library and notes were destroyed by a bombing raid in 1943.

== Bibliography ==
- Inscriptiones Graecae
  - I^{2} Inscriptiones Atticae Euclidis anno anteriores. (Inscriptions of Attica, from before the year of Euclid [403/2 BC]) 1924.
  - IV^{2}, 1. Inscriptiones Argolidis: Inscriptiones Epidauri (Inscriptions of the Argolid: Inscriptions of Epidaurus). 1929.
  - V, 2. Inscriptiones Arcadiae (Inscriptions of Arcadia). 1913.
  - XI, 3. Inscriptiones Deli. Tabulae (Inscriptions of Delos. Tables). 1927.
  - XII, 2. Inscriptiones Rhodi, Chalces, Carpathi cum Saro, Casi (Inscriptions of Rhodes, Chalcis, Carpathus with Saros, and Kasos). 1895.
  - XII, 3. Inscriptiones Symes, Teutlussae, Teli, Nisyri, Astypalaeae, Anaphes, Therae et Therasiae, Pholegandri, Meli, Cimoli (Inscriptions of Syme, Sesklio, Telos, Nisyros, Astypalaea, Anafi, Thera and Therasia, Pholegandros, Melos, Kimolos) 1898. Supplementum (Supplement). 1904.
  - XII, 5. Inscriptiones Cycladum (Inscriptions of the Cyclades). 1903, 1909.
  - XII, Inscriptiones insularum maris Aegaei praeter Delum: Supplementum. (Inscriptions of the Aegean islands aside from Delos: Supplement) 1939.
- Inschriften von Priene (Inscriptions of Priene) Reimer, Berlin 1906; reissued by Walter de Gruyter 1968.
- Sylloge inscriptionum Graecarum. 3rd edition. 4 volumes. Hirzel, Leipzig 1915–1924.
- Thera. Untersuchungen, Vermessungen, Ausgrabungen in den Jahren 1895–1898 (Thera: Investigations, Surveys, and Excavations in the years 1895–1898). 5 volumes. Reimer, Berlin 1898–1903.
