= Brucepattersonius misionensis =

Conservation status
- Data Deficient (IUCN 3.1)

Scientific classification
- Kingdom: Animalia
- Phylum: Chordata
- Class: Mammalia
- Order: Rodentia
- Family: Cricetidae
- Subfamily: Sigmodontinae
- Genus: Brucepattersonius
- Species: B. misionensis

Binomial name
- Brucepattersonius misionensis Mares and Braun, 2000

Species of rodent

Brucepattersonius misionensis, also known as the Misiones akodont or Misiones brucie, is a rodent species from South America in the genus Brucepattersonius. It is known from a single individual collected in Misiones Province in northeastern Argentina. Its taxonomic status remains to be determined conclusively. It is threatened by habitat loss and is not known from any protected areas.

== Literature cited ==
- Duff, A. and Lawson, A. 2004. Mammals of the World: A checklist. New Haven, Connecticut: Yale University Press, 312 pp. ISBN 0-7136-6021-X
- Musser, G. G.; Carleton, M. D. (2005). "Superfamily Muroidea". In Wilson, D. E.; Reeder, D. M. (eds.). Mammal Species of the World: A Taxonomic and Geographic Reference (3rd ed.). Johns Hopkins University Press. p. 1105. ISBN 978-0-8018-8221-0. OCLC 62265494.
