= Brucepattersonius guarani =

Conservation status
- Data Deficient (IUCN 3.1)

Scientific classification
- Kingdom: Animalia
- Phylum: Chordata
- Class: Mammalia
- Order: Rodentia
- Family: Cricetidae
- Subfamily: Sigmodontinae
- Genus: Brucepattersonius
- Species: B. guarani

Binomial name
- Brucepattersonius guarani Mares and Braun, 2000

Species of rodent

Brucepattersonius guarani, also known as the Guaraní akodont or Guaraní brucie, is a South American rodent in the genus Brucepattersonius. It is known from a single specimen from Misiones Province in northeastern Argentina, at the southern end of the Atlantic Forest. The species is protected by Moconá Provincial Park but is threatened by deforestation in nearby areas.

== Literature cited ==
- Duff, A. and Lawson, A. 2004. Mammals of the World: A checklist. New Haven, Connecticut: Yale University Press, 312 pp. ISBN 0-7136-6021-X
- Patton, J.L., Pardiñas Ulyses F.J., D'Elia, G.. Mammals of South America, Volume 2: Rodents. University of Chicago Press. 2015. 214.
- Musser, G. G.; Carleton, M. D. (2005). "Superfamily Muroidea". In Wilson, D. E.; Reeder, D. M. (eds.). Mammal Species of the World: A Taxonomic and Geographic Reference (3rd ed.). Johns Hopkins University Press. p. 1104. ISBN 978-0-8018-8221-0. OCLC 62265494.
