= Arroyo of Paradise brucie =

Conservation status
- Data Deficient (IUCN 3.1)

Scientific classification
- Kingdom: Animalia
- Phylum: Chordata
- Class: Mammalia
- Order: Rodentia
- Family: Cricetidae
- Subfamily: Sigmodontinae
- Genus: Brucepattersonius
- Species: B. paradisus

Binomial name
- Brucepattersonius paradisus Mares & Braun, 2000

Species of rodent

The Arroyo of Paradise brucie (Brucepattersonius paradisus), also known as the Arroyo of Paradise akodont, is a South American rodent species of the family Cricetidae. It is known only from northeastern Argentina. No population data is available for the species; it is threatened by deforestation and has not been found in any protected area.
