= Samuel Lloyd Noble =

Samuel Lloyd Noble, known as Lloyd Noble (30 November 1896 in Ardmore, Oklahoma – 14 February 1950 in Houston, Texas), was an oilman and philanthropist, founder of the Noble Corporation and the Samuel Roberts Noble Foundation. He attended Southeastern Normal College in Durant, Oklahoma and the University of Oklahoma. After his father died, Noble enlisted in the U. S. Navy in 1918, and was discharged the following year after the armistice was signed that ended World War I.

Lloyd Noble began his career in the early years of oil drilling in the state, founding the Noble Drilling Company on April 1, 1921. The company began using Hughes Simplex rock bits created by the Hughes Tool Company in the 1920s and was noted for adopting new technologies. With his wealth, Noble founded the Samuel Roberts Noble Foundation, charged with undertaking philanthropy and advancing agricultural practices and science.

== Biography ==
Noble was born in 1896 and raised in a family of hardware merchants, whose store was built in Ardmore, Oklahoma, then a part of the Chickasaw Indian Territory. As a young man, Noble attended college in Durant, Oklahoma, earning a teaching certificate. He taught school, but quit to attend college at the University of Oklahoma. His pursuit of higher education was cut short when he left in order to help his ailing father with the family business.

Noble was known for his interests in aviation, geoscience and other emerging scientific developments of the century.

During World War II, he was asked to improve the United Kingdom’s oil production. England needed oil and sent an emissary to request the help of a number of American oil drillers. Noble risked his rigs and crew in the top secret endeavor to quickly drill multiple wells in a small oil field in Sherwood Forest. The endeavor relied on Noble Drilling’s ability to drill 106 wells in one year: from March 1943 to March 1944. The production of the field increased from 700 barrels a day to over 3,000 barrels a day. Noble’s company took no profit from the operation. As a manager, Noble was known to reward hard working employees throughout his company by including them in a share of profits for successful wells.

Noble served as a regent for the University of Oklahoma from 1934 to 1948. He was known to recognize and recruit talent, whether it be faculty, administrators or coaches. In addition, he believed that development of a university football program could propel the university and state out of the economic and psychological Dust Bowl and Great Depression stagnation of the 1930s.

== Samuel Roberts Noble Foundation ==
Improving agriculture to avoid another Dust Bowl was one of the reasons for establishing the Samuel Roberts Noble Foundation, devoted to agricultural sustainability. In 1950 he said, "No man can have assurance for himself and his posterity living for himself alone. In order to have things for one’s self, one must join in the defense of those same things for others.”

In 1945, Noble established the Samuel Roberts Noble Foundation dedicated to advancing agricultural science. Today the Foundation is the largest private agricultural and plant science research institution in the United States. It is the largest private foundation in the state and is in the top 50 in the U. S. in the size of its assets. Service to a greater good was the founding principle for the Foundation. Noble, flying over acres of The Dust Bowl-devastated farmland, conceived of the foundation’s mission to advance agricultural science and practice in a sustainable way, thereby safeguarding the land and soils for future generations.

Noble is recognized as one of the fifty most influential residents of Oklahoma in the 20th century.

== See also ==
- Lloyd Noble Center
- Ardmore, Oklahoma
- Sam Noble Oklahoma Museum of Natural History
