= Soricine brucie =

Soricine Brucie

Conservation status
- Data Deficient (IUCN 3.1)

Scientific classification
- Kingdom: Animalia
- Phylum: Chordata
- Class: Mammalia
- Order: Rodentia
- Family: Cricetidae
- Subfamily: Sigmodontinae
- Genus: Brucepattersonius
- Species: B. soricinus

Binomial name
- Brucepattersonius soricinus Hershkovitz, 1998

Species of rodent

The soricine brucie (Brucepattersonius soricinus) is a rodent species from South America. It is found in Brazil.
