= Viscacha rat =

Viscacha rats are a group of rodents in the family Octodontidae. All species are found in Argentina. They are placed in the following genera:

- Genus Octomys
  - O. mimax , mountain viscacha rat, found in the Andes
- Genus Pipanacoctomys
  - P. aureus, the golden viscacha rat, found near a salt flat
- Genus Tympanoctomys (4 species, 3 extant), found in desert shrubland near salt flats
  - T. barrerae, the plains viscacha rat
  - T. kirchnerorum, Kirchner's viscacha rat,
  - T. loschalchalerosorum, the Chalchalero viscacha rat
  - †T. cordubensis
