= Brucepattersonius iheringi =

Conservation status
- Least Concern (IUCN 3.1)

Scientific classification
- Kingdom: Animalia
- Phylum: Chordata
- Class: Mammalia
- Order: Rodentia
- Family: Cricetidae
- Subfamily: Sigmodontinae
- Genus: Brucepattersonius
- Species: B. iheringi

Binomial name
- Brucepattersonius iheringi (Thomas, 1896)

Synonyms
- Oxymycterus iheringi Thomas, 1896; Brucepattersonius iheringi: Hershkovitz, 1998

Species of rodent

Brucepattersonius iheringi, also known as Ihering's akodont, Ihering's hocicudo, or Ihering's brucie, is a South American rodent in the genus Brucepattersonius. It occurs in Santa Catarina and Rio Grande do Sul, southern Brazil, and nearby Misiones Province, Argentina.

== Literature cited ==
- Musser, G. G.; Carleton, M. D. (2005). "Superfamily Muroidea". In Wilson, D. E.; Reeder, D. M. (eds.). Mammal Species of the World: A Taxonomic and Geographic Reference (3rd ed.). Johns Hopkins University Press. pp. 894–1531. ISBN 978-0-8018-8221-0. OCLC 62265494.
