= Brucepattersonius griserufescens =

Conservation status
- Data Deficient (IUCN 3.1)

Scientific classification
- Kingdom: Animalia
- Phylum: Chordata
- Class: Mammalia
- Order: Rodentia
- Family: Cricetidae
- Subfamily: Sigmodontinae
- Genus: Brucepattersonius
- Species: B. griserufescens

Binomial name
- Brucepattersonius griserufescens Hershkovitz, 1998

Species of rodent

Brucepattersonius griserufescens, also known as the gray-bellied akodont or grey-bellied brucie, is a rodent in the cricetid genus Brucepattersonius from southeastern Brazil, specifically the states of Minas Gerais, Espírito Santo and Rio de Janeiro between 1,300 and 2,700 metres (4,300 and 8,900 ft). It was one of four species of Brucepattersonius described by Hershkovitz in 1998; another, Brucepattersonius albinasus, also known as the white-nosed akodont or white-nosed brucie, was later argued to be the same as B. griserufescens, though further work is needed to confirm this. It is threatened by habitat loss but is also protected by Caparaó National Park.

== Literature cited ==
- Duff, A. and Lawson, A. 2004. Mammals of the World: A checklist. New Haven, Connecticut: Yale University Press, 312 pp. ISBN 0-7136-6021-X
- Hershkovitz, P. (1998). Report of some sigmodontinae rodents collected in southeastern Brazil with description of a new genus and six new species. Bonner Zoologische Beitraege, 47, 193–256.
- Musser, G.G. and Carleton, M.D. 2005. Superfamily Muroidea. Pp. 894–1531 in Wilson, D.E. and Reeder, D.M. (eds.). Mammal Species of the World: a taxonomic and geographic reference. 3rd ed. Baltimore: The Johns Hopkins University Press, 2 vols., 2142 pp. ISBN 978-0-8018-8221-0
- Vilela, J. F., J. A. de Oliveira, and C. R. Bonvicino (2006). Taxonomic status of Brucepattersonius albinasus (Rodentia: Sigmodontinae). Zootaxa, 1199, 61–68.
- Patton, J.L., Pardiñas, Ulyses F.J., D'Elía Guillermo (2015). Mammals of South America, Volume 2: Rodents. University of Chicago Press, 213.
