= Brucepattersonius igniventris =

Conservation status
- Data Deficient (IUCN 3.1)

Scientific classification
- Kingdom: Animalia
- Phylum: Chordata
- Class: Mammalia
- Order: Rodentia
- Family: Cricetidae
- Subfamily: Sigmodontinae
- Genus: Brucepattersonius
- Species: B. igniventris

Binomial name
- Brucepattersonius igniventris Hershkovitz, 1998

Species of rodent

Brucepattersonius igniventris, also known as the red-bellied akodont or red-bellied brucie, is a South American rodent in the genus Brucepattersonius. It is known only from a few specimens from the type locality in Iporanga, São Paulo, Brazil. Although it is threatened by habitat loss, it is protected by Alto Ribeira Tourist State Park.

== Literature cited ==
- Duff, A. and Lawson, A. 2004. Mammals of the World: A checklist. New Haven, Connecticut: Yale University Press, 312 pp. ISBN 0-7136-6021-X
- Musser, G.G. and Carleton, M.D. 2005. Superfamily Muroidea. Pp. 894–1531 in Wilson, D.E. and Reeder, D.M. (eds.). Mammal Species of the World: a taxonomic and geographic reference. 3rd ed. Baltimore: The Johns Hopkins University Press, 2 vols., 2142 pp. ISBN 978-0-8018-8221-0
