= Sam Noble Oklahoma Museum of Natural History =

Museum at the University of Oklahoma in the US

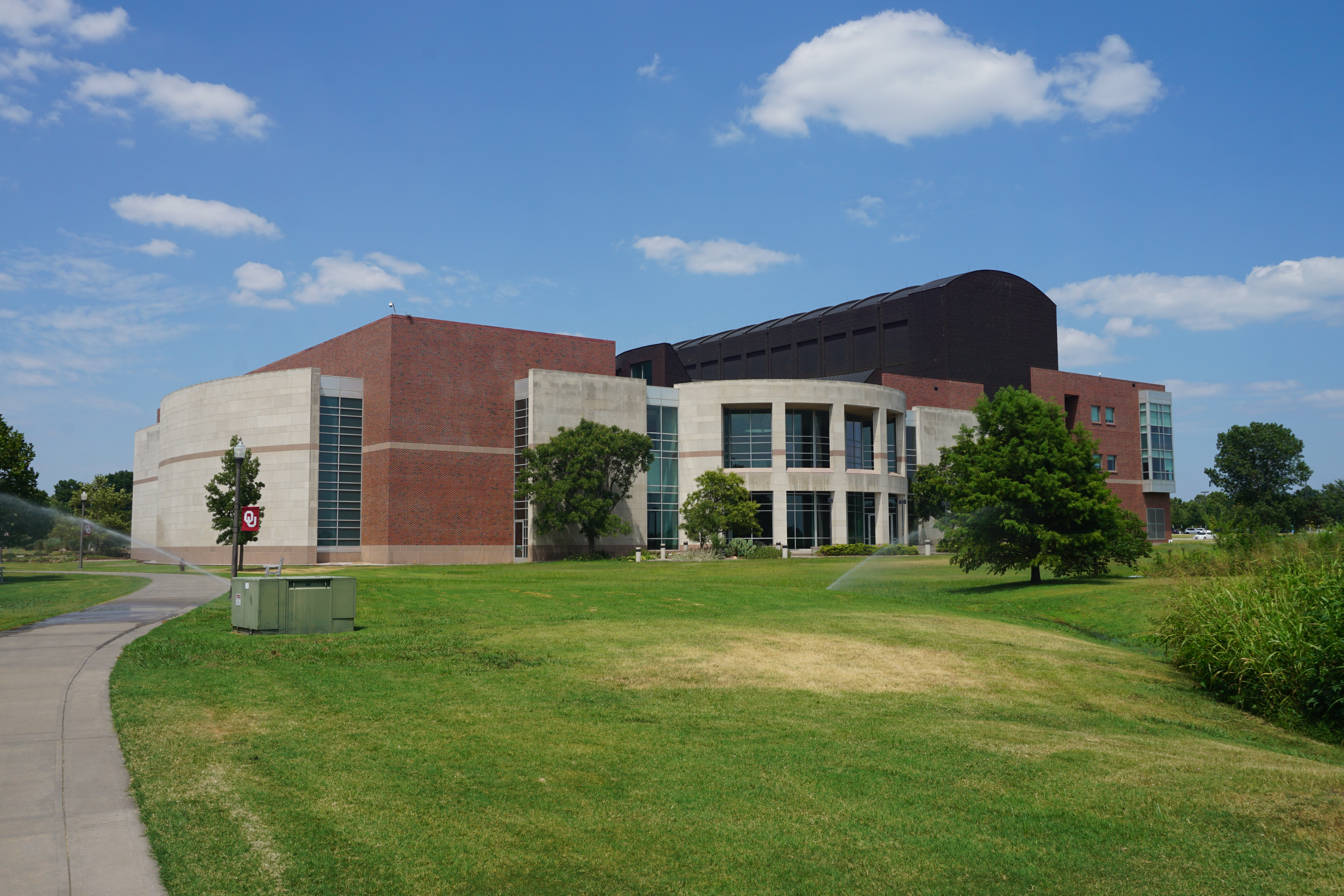
Sam Noble Oklahoma Museum of Natural History exterior

The Sam Noble Oklahoma Museum of Natural History, formerly the Stovall Museum of Science and History and The Museum of the University of Oklahoma, is the officially designated natural history museum for the State of Oklahoma, located on the campus of the University of Oklahoma. The museum was founded in 1899 by an act of the Oklahoma Territorial Legislature. Its current building was completed in 1999 under the leadership of Michael A. Mares, who was director from 1983 to 2003 and from 2008 to 2018. The museum contains more than 10 million objects and specimens in 12 collections. The current building is a 198,000-square-foot facility with almost 50,000 square feet (4,600 m^{2}) of public space, with five permanent and two temporary galleries and exhibits that provide an in-depth tour of Oklahoma's natural and cultural history. The remainder of the facility is dedicated to housing museum collections, laboratories, libraries, and offices. It is one of the world's largest university-based natural history museums.

Before its 1999 relocation and expansion, the original museum chartered by the Oklahoma legislature in 1899 had occupied much smaller quarters in various buildings on campus. It was originally named as the Department of Geology and Natural History, renamed the Museum of the University of Oklahoma in 1943, and in 1953 named the Stovall Museum of Science and History, for J. Willis Stovall, a paleontologist and faculty professor who was director from 1943 to 1953.

== History ==
Nearly 10 years after the founding of the University of Oklahoma in 1890, the Oklahoma Territorial Legislature became interested in establishing a museum at what was then the Territorial University. In 1899 the legislature passed a law (Chapter XVI) establishing the position of a territorial geologist and further addressed the collections that would be amassed from the geologist's ongoing work. The law also established that a Department of Geology and Natural History would begin a scientific survey of the Territory of Oklahoma, and mandated the discovery and development of natural resources, including flora, fauna, and minerals.

As the university's collections grew during the early 20th century, several attempts were made to build a museum facility to house new collections, exhibit materials and specimens. The attempts were nearly successful in 1920 when university leadership funded an expedition to Alaska for the collection of North American megafauna specimens (grizzly bears, caribou, mountain goats, etc.). It was hoped that these specimens would excite Oklahomans and their legislators to provide funds for a new museum facility. Although those specimens are still preserved and studied even to this day, a museum funding bill was ultimately vetoed at the time by the governor.

Museum collections continued to grow without a dedicated facility throughout the Great Depression and Dust Bowl. At the time, President Franklin Roosevelt and his Works Progress Administration (WPA) sought to ease mass unemployment during the Great Depression through federal jobs and careers. It was through this program that about 50 workers were assigned to museum paleontologist J. Willis Stovall. The workers were employed to strategically uncover and excavate dinosaur fossils across the state of Oklahoma. Discovering a number of large, unique specimens of dinosaurs and mammals, the museum's vertebrate fossil collection quickly grew in prominence, while also demanding additional storage space.

At the same time, university archaeologists supervised excavations throughout eastern Oklahoma with large teams of laborers supported by the WPA. Most notable were excavations at Spiro Mounds, an important center occupied primarily in AD 1000–1400. This intervention was initially oriented towards salvaging Craig Mound, which had been subjected to extensive looting in the mid-1930s. These WPA excavations deepened the understanding of Native American pre-contact history in Oklahoma and yielded cultural material that formed the basis of the museum's early archaeology collection.

J. Willis Stovall ultimately developed a plan to bring all of the university's extensive collections together under a single museum umbrella. In the late 1930s, Stovall was named as the director of this early museum, which was largely scattered among numerous university colleges and departments. While Stovall made repeated attempts to obtain funding for a dedicated museum facility, he was unable to do so before his death in 1953. Though the museum collections remained scattered physically, Stovall's work was instrumental in uniting the collections under a single administrative unit and securing limited storage space for a number of objects and specimens.By 1980, the museum collections remained scattered across 10 separate buildings, often substandard for specimen preservation, including a horse stable, a wooden barn, two wooden barracks constructed during World War II, various attics and basements, and an armory for the Reserve Officers Training Corps (ROTC) constructed in the 1930s that served as the museum's main building. This building was officially renamed the Stovall Museum of Science and History following the death of J. Willis Stovall.

Beginning in 1983 under the leadership of museum director Michael Mares, the Stovall Museum began a campaign to make Oklahoma citizens aware of the fragility of their state's most valuable natural and cultural treasures, and the substandard conditions in which these artifacts were being stored. Over several years, Mares and museum staff would also share this message with state representatives and state senators and work to develop a new state law which recognized the Stovall Museum as a state resource, not only a university organization. In 1987, the Oklahoma Legislature and governor approved a law (70 OK Stat §70-3309.1) that designated the Stovall Museum as the official Oklahoma Museum of Natural History.

In the early 1990s, a group of concerned citizens in Norman, Oklahoma, began to lobby for a new museum facility to better care for the state's collection of natural and cultural artifacts. The group ultimately secured a special election in 1992, which concluded with the citizens of Norman pledging a $5 million bond commitment for the construction of a new museum facility, contingent on the state of Oklahoma and private donors raising $30 million. A statewide bond election passed, securing the state of Oklahoma's $15 million financial commitment. Shortly after, a $10 million donation from the Samuel Roberts Noble Foundation and affiliates secured both the facility's official name, the Sam Noble Oklahoma Museum of Natural History, and most of the remaining funds needed for the facility's construction with help from other key donors and supporters.

Groundbreaking for the Sam Noble Oklahoma Museum of Natural History took place in 1996, and the new museum building was officially opened to the public in May 2000.

== Permanent Exhibits ==
=== Orientation Gallery ===
The Noble Corporation and Noble Energy Orientation Gallery is the first permanent gallery space visitors encounter in the museum's public exhibit hall. The gallery showcases the museum's behind-the-scenes work and teaches visitors about how museum collections are preserved and studied. The gallery features objects and artifacts from nearly all of the museum's 12 collections, including a representation of Sauroposeidon proteles, which is immediately visible upon entering the museum's exhibit hall. Sauroposeidon holds the Guinness World Record for the tallest dinosaur.

=== Hall of Ancient Life ===
Stretching back into the prehistory of Oklahoma, the Siegfried Family Hall of Ancient Life extends from the formation of Planet Earth up to the most recent Ice Age. The gallery features detailed models, interactive tools, detailed dioramas of cast fossil specimens and original fossil specimens.

- Clash of the Titans – The Jon Rex and Ann Jones & Jonny and Brenda Jones Clash of the Titans is the largest exhibit featured in the Hall of Ancient Life. It depicts Oklahoma's state fossil, the large carnivore Saurophaganax maximus challenging a representation of the largest known Apatosaurus (92 ft), reconstructed by upscaling smaller apatosaur fossil specimens to match the largest known pieces currently preserved in the Sam Noble Museum's vertebrate paleontology collection.
- Pentaceratops – The Hall of Ancient Life also features an original, nearly complete mounted fossilized skeleton of Pentaceratops, arguably classified by some as Titanoceratops ouranos. This specimen currently holds the Guinness World Record for the largest skull of any known land animal in recorded history.

=== Hall of the People of Oklahoma ===
The McCasland Foundation Hall of the People of Oklahoma traces the 30,000-year history of Native inhabitants of Oklahoma and North America. Exhibits detail the earliest known evidence of human activity in Oklahoma, continuing up to the present, and examining what it means to be a Native American in Oklahoma today. The museum has a "sustained collaboration" with the Kiowa community of southwestern Oklahoma. The Museum hosts the annual Oklahoma Native American Youth Language Fair, "one of the largest gatherings of Native American language learners in the United States." In 2014 it hosted a communityworkshop on "Native Plants and Native Peoples."

- Cooper Skull – Highlights within the Hall of the People of Oklahoma include the “Cooper Skull,” a skull of a now extinct bison species, painted with a red zigzag pattern. At 10,000 years old, it is the oldest known painted object in North America.

=== Hall of World Cultures ===
The Merkel Family Foundation Gallery of World Cultures features objects and artifacts of traditional art and material culture from around the world, chosen from the museum's diverse ethnology collection. The gallery also includes a large section of mosaic found in Antioch (modern Turkey) and dating to around 100 CE.

=== Hall of Natural Wonders ===
The Noble Drilling Corporation Hall of Natural Wonders highlights the biodiversity found across Oklahoma. Immersion-style dioramas aim to surround visitors with both the sights and sounds of unique biomes and environments native to the state. From the Ozark highlands, limestone caves, mixed grass prairies, to the Black Mesa, the habitats of Oklahoma all come together in some of the most recent and interactive additions to the Sam Noble Museum.
