= Brucepattersonius =

Scientific classification
- Domain: Eukaryota
- Kingdom: Animalia
- Phylum: Chordata
- Class: Mammalia
- Order: Rodentia
- Family: Cricetidae
- Subfamily: Sigmodontinae
- Tribe: Akodontini
- Genus: Brucepattersonius; Hershkovitz, 1998

Type species
- Brucepattersonius soricinus

Species
- Brucepattersonius griserufescens; Brucepattersonius guarani; Brucepattersonius igniventris; Brucepattersonius iheringi; Brucepattersonius misionensis; Brucepattersonius paradisus; Brucepattersonius soricinus

Genus of rodents

Brucepattersonius is a genus of rodents within the tribe Akodontini from southeastern South America. Also known as brucies, the genus is named after Bruce Patterson, MacArthur Curator at the Department of Zoology (Mammals), at the Field Museum of Natural History, Chicago.

== History ==
In 1998, Philip Hershkovitz described the genus and four species from the Atlantic Forest of southeastern Brazil and also included the previously described species B. iheringi, which had been included in Oxymycterus and some other genera before. Two years later, Mares and Braun described three additional species from Misiones Province, northeastern Argentina, on the basis of a total of three specimens. In 2006, Vilela and others found that two of Hershkovitz's species were in fact identical. More material from Argentina was later reported, but not assigned to species.

== Description ==
The brucies belong to the subfamily Sigmodontinae and the tribe Akodontini. They are ground-dwellers, and may have a preference for higher altitudes within the rainforest area. Each species is thought to be restricted to a limited area. It is uncertain if they are all distinct species, since many are known from very few specimens, which makes it difficult to know how variable brucies are.
