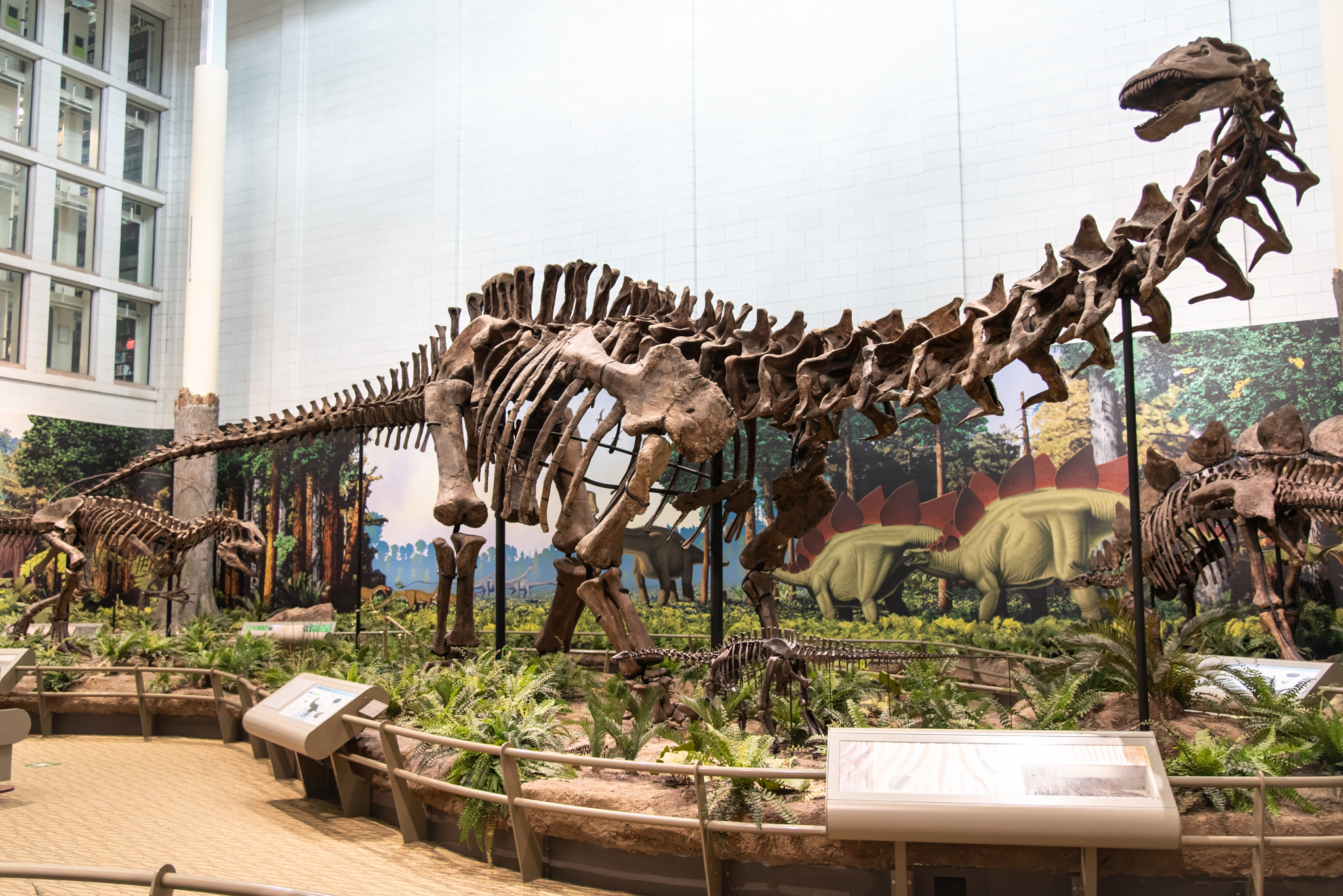
- Mounted A. louisae (specimen CM 3018), Carnegie Museum of Natural History

Scientific classification
- Kingdom: Animalia
- Phylum: Chordata
- Class: Reptilia
- Clade: Dinosauria
- Clade: Saurischia
- Clade: †Sauropodomorpha
- Clade: †Sauropoda
- Superfamily: †Diplodocoidea
- Family: †Diplodocidae
- Subfamily: †Apatosaurinae
- Genus: †Apatosaurus; Marsh, 1877

Type species
- †Apatosaurus ajax Marsh, 1877

Other species
- †A. louisae Holland, 1916

Synonyms
- Atlantosaurus montanus? Marsh, 1877

= Apatosaurus =

Apatosaurus Temporal range: Late Jurassic (Kimmeridgian), 152–151 Ma

Sauropod dinosaur genus from Late Jurassic period

Apatosaurus (/əˌpætəˈsɔːrəs/; meaning "deceptive lizard") is a genus of herbivorous sauropod dinosaur that lived in North America during the Late Jurassic period. Othniel Charles Marsh described and named the first-known species, Apatosaurus ajax, in 1877, and a second species, Apatosaurus louisae, was discovered and named by William H. Holland in 1916. Apatosaurus lived about 152 to 151 million years ago (mya), during the late Kimmeridgian to early Tithonian age, and are now known from fossils in the Morrison Formation of modern-day Colorado, Oklahoma, New Mexico, Wyoming, and Utah in the United States. Apatosaurus had an average length of 21–23 m (69–75 ft), and an average mass of 16.4–22.4 t (16.1–22.0 long tons; 18.1–24.7 short tons). A few specimens indicate a maximum length of 11–30% greater than average and a mass of approximately 33 t (32 long tons; 36 short tons).

Apatosaurus is a member of the diplodocid family, differing from Diplodocus proper in primarily robustness in the cervical vertebrae and the leg bones. The cervical vertebrae of Apatosaurus are less elongated and more heavily constructed than those of Diplodocus and the bones of the leg are much stockier despite being longer, implying that Apatosaurus was a more robust animal. The tail was held above the ground during normal locomotion. Apatosaurus had a single claw on each forelimb and three on each hindlimb. The Apatosaurus skull, long thought to be similar to Camarasaurus, is much more similar to that of Diplodocus. Apatosaurus was a generalized browser that likely held its head elevated. To lighten its vertebrae, Apatosaurus had air sacs that made the bones internally full of holes. Like that of other diplodocids, its tail may have been used as a whip to create loud noises, or, as more recently suggested, as a sensory organ.

The skull of Apatosaurus was confused with that of Camarasaurus and Brachiosaurus until 1909, when the holotype of A. louisae was found, and a complete skull just a few meters away from the front of the neck. Henry Fairfield Osborn disagreed with this association, and went on to mount a skeleton of Apatosaurus with a Camarasaurus skull cast. Apatosaurus skeletons were mounted with speculative skull casts until 1970, when McIntosh showed that more robust skulls assigned to Diplodocus were more likely from Apatosaurus.

Apatosaurus is a genus in the family Diplodocidae. It is one of the more basal genera, with only Amphicoelias and possibly a new, unnamed genus more primitive. Although the subfamily Apatosaurinae was named in 1929, the group was not used validly until an extensive 2015 study. Only Brontosaurus is also in the subfamily, with the other genera being considered synonyms or reclassified as diplodocines. Brontosaurus has long been considered a junior synonym of Apatosaurus; its type species was reclassified as A. excelsus in 1903. A 2015 study concluded that Brontosaurus is a valid genus of sauropod distinct from Apatosaurus, but not all paleontologists agree with this division. As it existed in North America during the late Jurassic, Apatosaurus would have lived alongside dinosaurs such as Allosaurus, Camarasaurus, Diplodocus, and Stegosaurus.

== Description ==
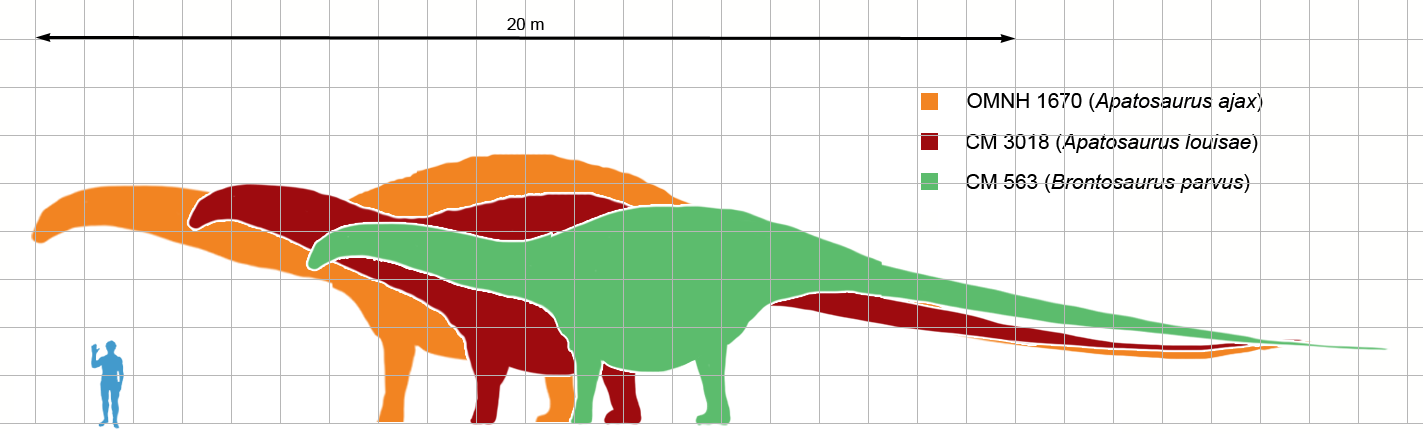
Comparison of A. ajax (orange) and A. louisae (red) with a human (blue) and Brontosaurus parvus (green)

Apatosaurus was a large, long-necked, quadrupedal animal with a long, whip-like tail. Its forelimbs were slightly shorter than its hindlimbs. Most size estimates are based on specimen CM 3018, the type specimen of A. louisae, reaching 21–23 m (69–75 ft) in length and 16.4–22.4 t (16.1–22.0 long tons; 18.1–24.7 short tons) in body mass. A 2015 study that estimated the mass of volumetric models of Dreadnoughtus, Apatosaurus, and Giraffatitan estimates CM 3018 at 21.8–38.2 t (21.5–37.6 long tons; 24.0–42.1 short tons), similar in mass to Dreadnoughtus. Some specimens of A. ajax (such as OMNH 1670) represent individuals 11–30% longer, suggesting masses twice that of CM 3018 or 32.7–72.6 t (32.2–71.5 long tons; 36.0–80.0 short tons), potentially rivaling the largest titanosaurs. However, the upper size estimate of OMNH 1670 is likely an exaggeration, with the size estimates revised in 2020 at 30 m (98 ft) in length and 33 t (36 short tons) in body mass based on volumetric analysis.

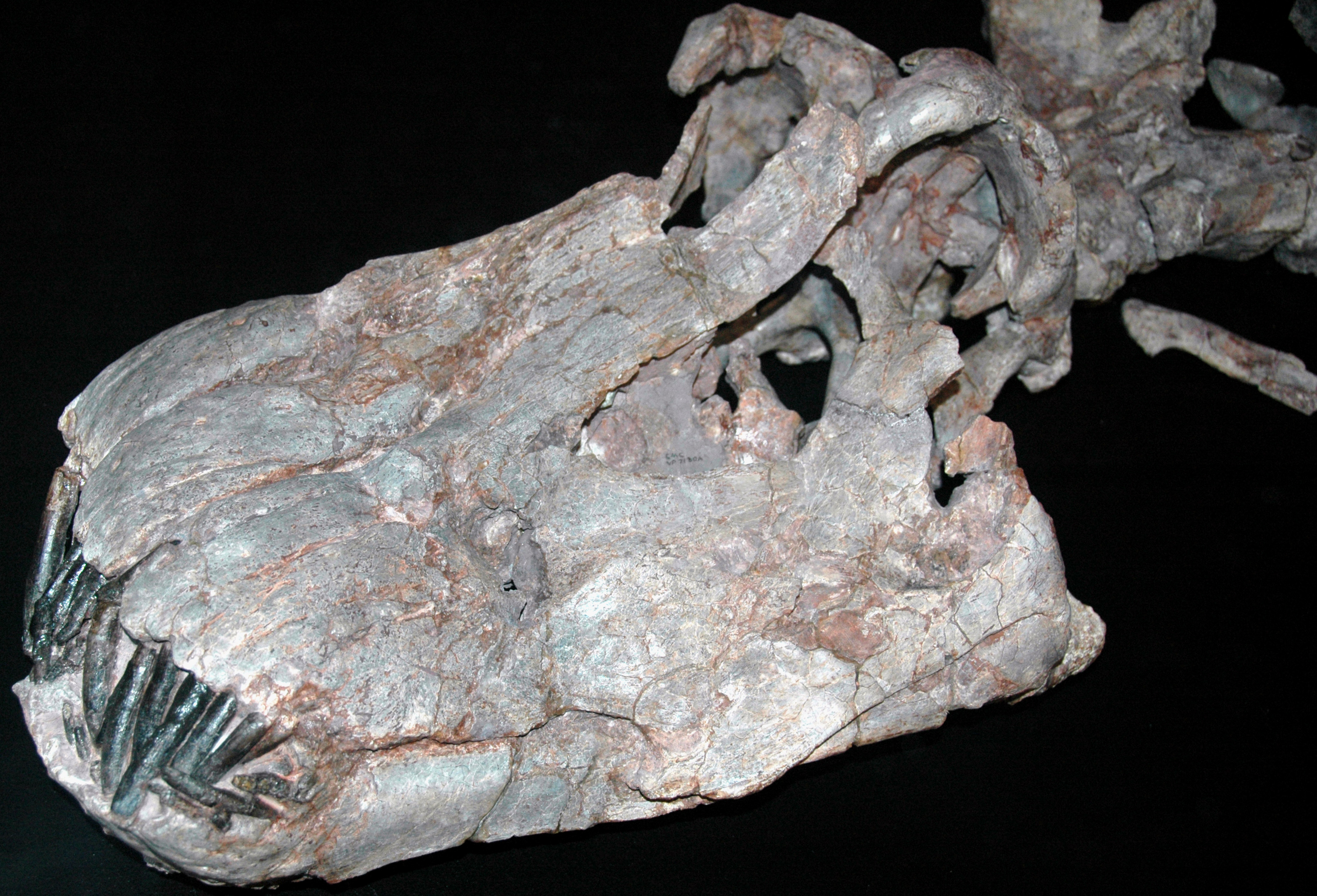
A. ajax skull, specimen CMC VP 7180

The skull is small in relation to the size of the animal. The jaws are lined with spatulate (chisel-like) teeth suited to an herbivorous diet. The snout of Apatosaurus and similar diplodocoids is squared, with only Nigersaurus having a squarer skull. The braincase of Apatosaurus is well preserved in specimen BYU 17096, which also preserved much of the skeleton. A phylogenetic analysis found that the braincase had a morphology similar to those of other diplodocoids. Some skulls of Apatosaurus have been found still in articulation with their teeth. Those teeth that have the enamel surface exposed do not show any scratches on the surface; instead, they display a sugary texture and little wear.

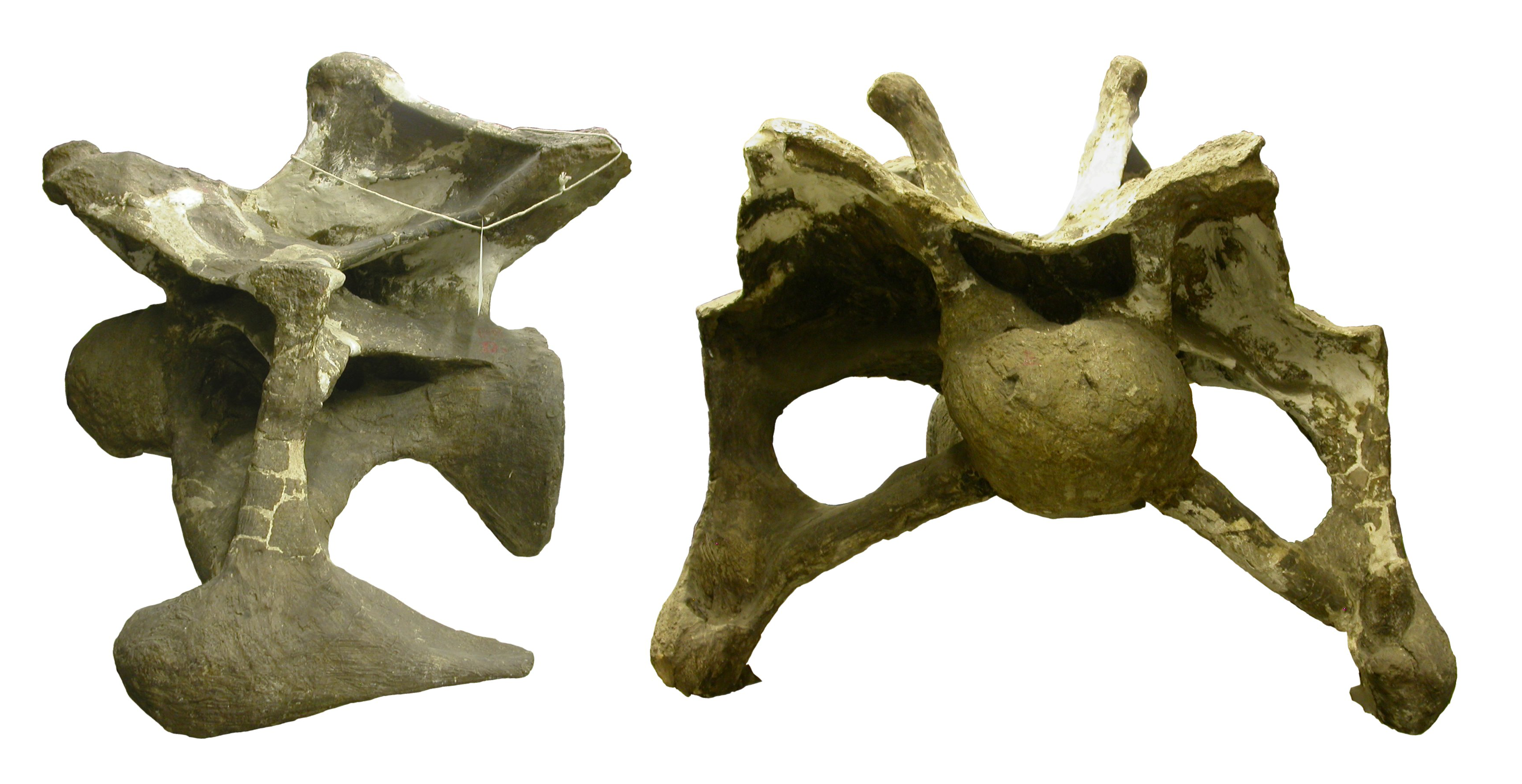
Cervical vertebra of A. ajax (holotype, YPM 1860) in side and anterior view

Like those of other sauropods, the neck vertebrae are deeply bifurcated; they carried neural spines with a large trough in the middle, resulting in a wide, deep neck. The vertebral formula for the holotype of A. louisae is 15 cervicals, 10 dorsals, 5 sacrals, and 82 caudals. The caudal vertebra number may vary, even within species. The cervical vertebrae of Apatosaurus and Brontosaurus are stouter and more robust than those of other diplodocids and were found to be most similar to Camarasaurus by Charles Whitney Gilmore. In addition, they support cervical ribs that extend farther towards the ground than in diplodocines, and have vertebrae and ribs that are narrower towards the top of the neck, making the neck nearly triangular in cross-section. In Apatosaurus louisae, the atlas-axis complex of the first cervicals is nearly fused. The dorsal ribs are not fused or tightly attached to their vertebrae and are instead loosely articulated. Apatosaurus has ten dorsal ribs on either side of the body. The large neck was filled with an extensive system of weight-saving air sacs. Apatosaurus, like its close relative Supersaurus, has tall neural spines, which make up more than half the height of the individual bones of its vertebrae. The shape of the tail is unusual for a diplodocid; it is comparatively slender because of the rapidly decreasing height of the vertebral spines with increasing distance from the hips. Apatosaurus also had very long ribs compared to most other diplodocids, giving it an unusually deep chest. As in other diplodocids, the tail transformed into a whip-like structure towards the end.

Life restoration of A. louisae

The limb bones are also very robust. Within Apatosaurinae, the scapula of Apatosaurus louisae is intermediate in morphology between those of A. ajax and Brontosaurus excelsus. The arm bones are stout, so the humerus of Apatosaurus resembles that of Camarasaurus, as well as Brontosaurus. However, the humeri of Brontosaurus and A. ajax are more similar to each other than they are to A. louisae. In 1936, Charles Gilmore noted that previous reconstructions of Apatosaurus forelimbs erroneously proposed that the radius and ulna could cross; in life they would have remained parallel. Apatosaurus had a single large claw on each forelimb, a feature shared by all sauropods more derived than Shunosaurus. The first three toes had claws on each hindlimb. The phalangeal formula is 2-1-1-1-1, meaning the innermost finger (phalanx) on the forelimb has two bones and the next has one. The single manual claw bone (ungual) is slightly curved and squarely truncated on the anterior end. The pelvic girdle includes the robust ilia, and the fused (co-ossified) pubes and ischia. The femora of Apatosaurus are very stout and represent some of the most robust femora of any member of Sauropoda. The tibia and fibula bones are different from the slender bones of Diplodocus but are nearly indistinguishable from those of Camarasaurus. The fibula is longer and slenderer than the tibia. The foot of Apatosaurus has three claws on the innermost digits; the digit formula is 3-4-5-3-2. The first metatarsal is the stoutest, a feature shared among diplodocids.

== Discovery and species ==
=== Initial discovery ===
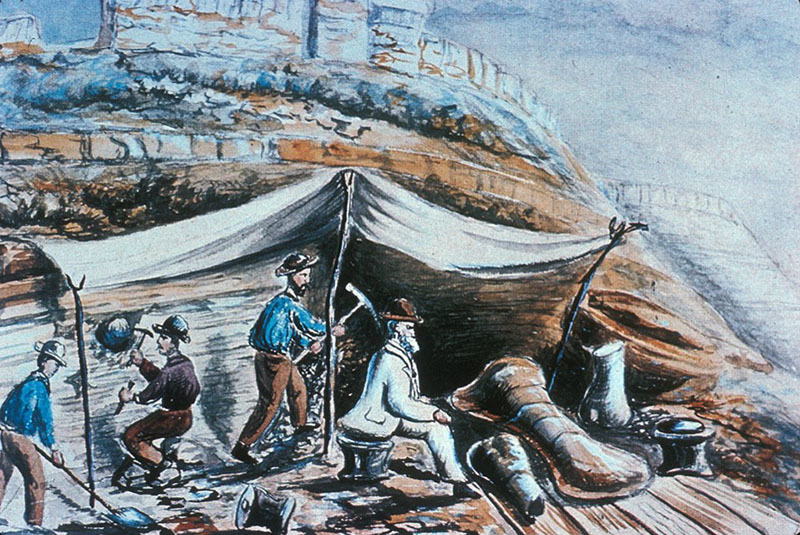
Arthur Lakes' painting of YPM crews excavating fossils of Apatosaurus ajax at Quarry 10 in Morrison.

The first Apatosaurus fossils were discovered by Arthur Lakes, a local miner, and his friend Henry C. Beckwith in the spring of 1877 in Morrison, a town in the eastern foothills of the Rocky Mountains in Jefferson County, Colorado. Arthur Lakes wrote to Othniel Charles Marsh, Professor of Paleontology at Yale University, and Edward Drinker Cope, a paleontologist based in Philadelphia, about the discovery until eventually collecting several fossils and sending them to both paleontologists. Marsh named Atlantosaurus montanus based on some of the fossils sent and hired Lakes to collect the rest of the material at Morrison and send it to Yale, while Cope attempted to hire Lakes as well but was rejected. One of the best specimens collected by Lakes in 1877 was a well preserved partial postcranial skeleton, including many vertebrae, and a partial braincase (YPM VP 1860), which was sent to Marsh and named Apatosaurus ajax in November 1877. The composite term Apatosaurus comes from the Greek words apátē (ἀπάτη) meaning "deception" and saûros (σαῦρος) meaning "lizard";, loosely translated as "deceptive lizard". Marsh gave it this name based on the chevron bones, which are dissimilar to those of other dinosaurs; instead, the chevron bones of Apatosaurus showed similarities with those of mosasaurs, most likely that of the representative species Mosasaurus. By the end of excavations at Lakes' quarry in Morrison, several partial specimens of Apatosaurus had been collected, but only the type specimen of A. ajax can be confidently referred to the species.

During excavation and transportation, the bones of the holotype skeleton were mixed with those of another Apatosaurine individual originally described as Atlantosaurus immanis; as a consequence, some elements cannot be ascribed to either specimen with confidence. Marsh distinguished the new genus Apatosaurus from Atlantosaurus on the basis of the number of sacral vertebrae, with Apatosaurus possessing three and Atlantosaurus four. Recent research shows that traits usually used to distinguish taxa at this time were actually widespread across several taxa, causing many of the taxa named to be invalid, like Atlantosaurus. Two years later, Marsh announced the discovery of a larger and more complete specimen (YPM VP 1980) from Como Bluff, Wyoming; he gave this specimen the name Brontosaurus excelsus. Also at Como Bluff, the Hubbell brothers working for Edward Drinker Cope collected a tibia, fibula, scapula, and several caudal vertebrae along with other fragments belonging to Apatosaurus in 1877–78 at Cope's Quarry 5 at the site. All specimens currently considered Apatosaurus were from the Morrison Formation, the location of the excavations of Marsh and Cope.

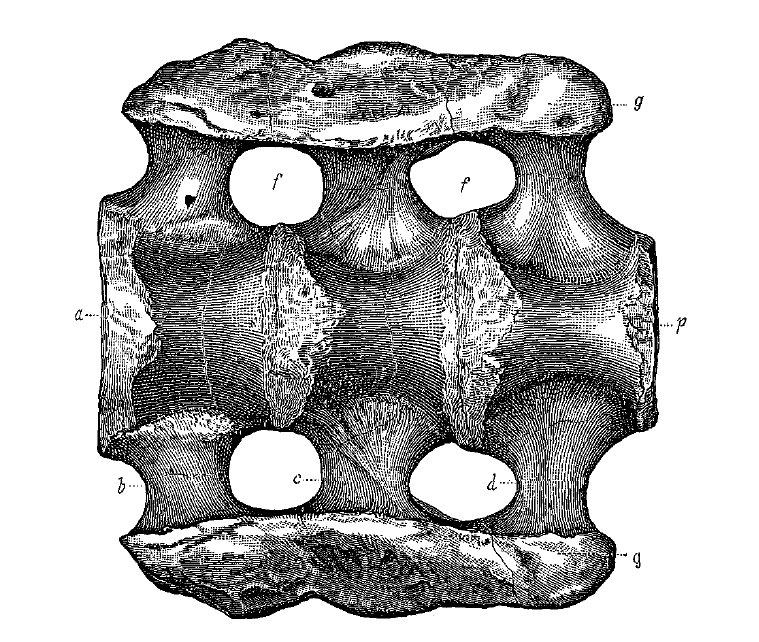
A. ajax sacrum, illustrated in 1879

=== Second Dinosaur Rush and skull issue ===
After the end of the Bone Wars, many major institutions in the eastern United States were inspired by the depictions and finds by Marsh and Cope to assemble their own dinosaur fossil collections. The competition to mount the first sauropod skeleton specifically was the most intense, with the American Museum of Natural History, Carnegie Museum of Natural History, and Field Museum of Natural History all sending expeditions to the west to find the most complete sauropod specimen, bring it back to the home institution, and mount it in their fossil halls. The American Museum of Natural History was the first to launch an expedition, finding a well preserved skeleton (AMNH 460), which is occasionally assigned to Apatosaurus, is considered nearly complete; only the head, feet, and sections of the tail are missing, and it was the first sauropod skeleton mounted. The specimen was found north of Medicine Bow, Wyoming, in 1898 by Walter Granger, and took the entire summer to extract. To complete the mount, sauropod feet that were discovered at the same quarry and a tail fashioned to appear as Marsh believed it should – but which had too few vertebrae – were added. In addition, a sculpted model of what the museum thought the skull of this massive creature might look like was made. This was not a delicate skull like that of Diplodocus – which was later found to be more accurate – but was based on "the biggest, thickest, strongest skull bones, lower jaws and tooth crowns from three different quarries". These skulls were likely those of Camarasaurus, the only other sauropod for which good skull material was known at the time. The mount construction was overseen by Adam Hermann, who failed to find Apatosaurus skulls. Hermann was forced to sculpt a stand-in skull by hand. Osborn said in a publication that the skull was "largely conjectural and based on that of Morosaurus" (now Camarasaurus).

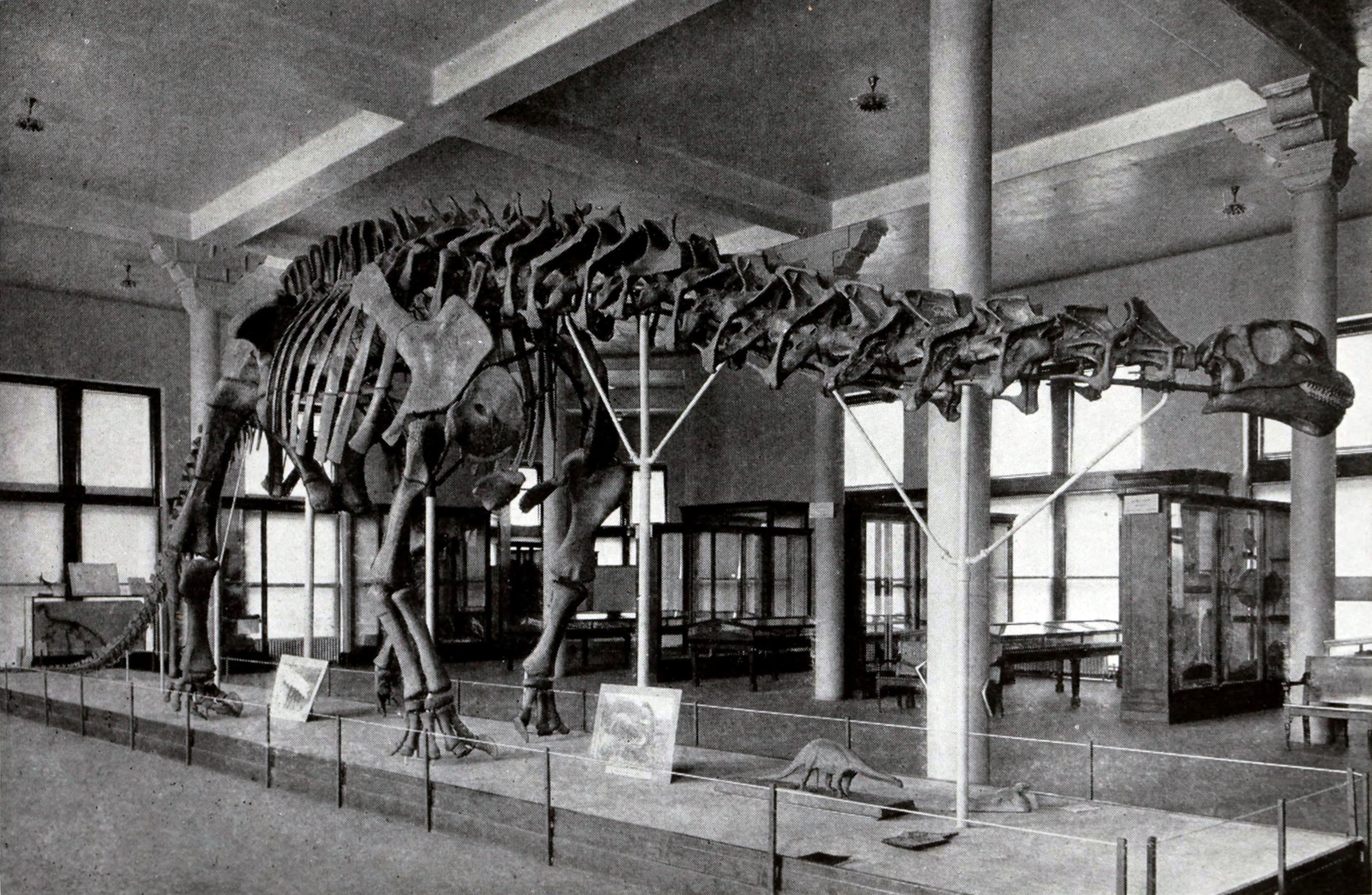
Obsolete mount of an apatosaurine (possibly Apatosaurus) specimen AMNH 460 with sculpted skull, American Museum of Natural History

In 1903, Elmer Riggs published a study that described a well-preserved skeleton of a diplodocid from the Grand River Valley near Fruita, Colorado, Field Museum of Natural History specimen P25112. Riggs thought that the deposits were similar in age to those of the Como Bluff in Wyoming from which Marsh had described Brontosaurus. Most of the skeleton was found, and after comparison with both Brontosaurus and Apatosaurus ajax, Riggs realized that the holotype of A. ajax was immature, and thus the features distinguishing the genera were not valid. Since Apatosaurus was the earlier name, Brontosaurus should be considered a junior synonym of Apatosaurus. Because of this, Riggs recombined Brontosaurus excelsus as Apatosaurus excelsus. Based on comparisons with other species proposed to belong to Apatosaurus, Riggs also determined that the Field Columbian Museum specimen was likely most similar to A. excelsus.

Despite Riggs' publication, Henry Fairfield Osborn, who was a strong opponent of Marsh and his taxa, labeled the Apatosaurus mount of the American Museum of Natural History Brontosaurus. Because of this decision the name Brontosaurus was commonly used outside of scientific literature for what Riggs considered Apatosaurus, and the museum's popularity meant that Brontosaurus became one of the best known dinosaurs, even though it was invalid throughout nearly all of the 20th and early 21st centuries.

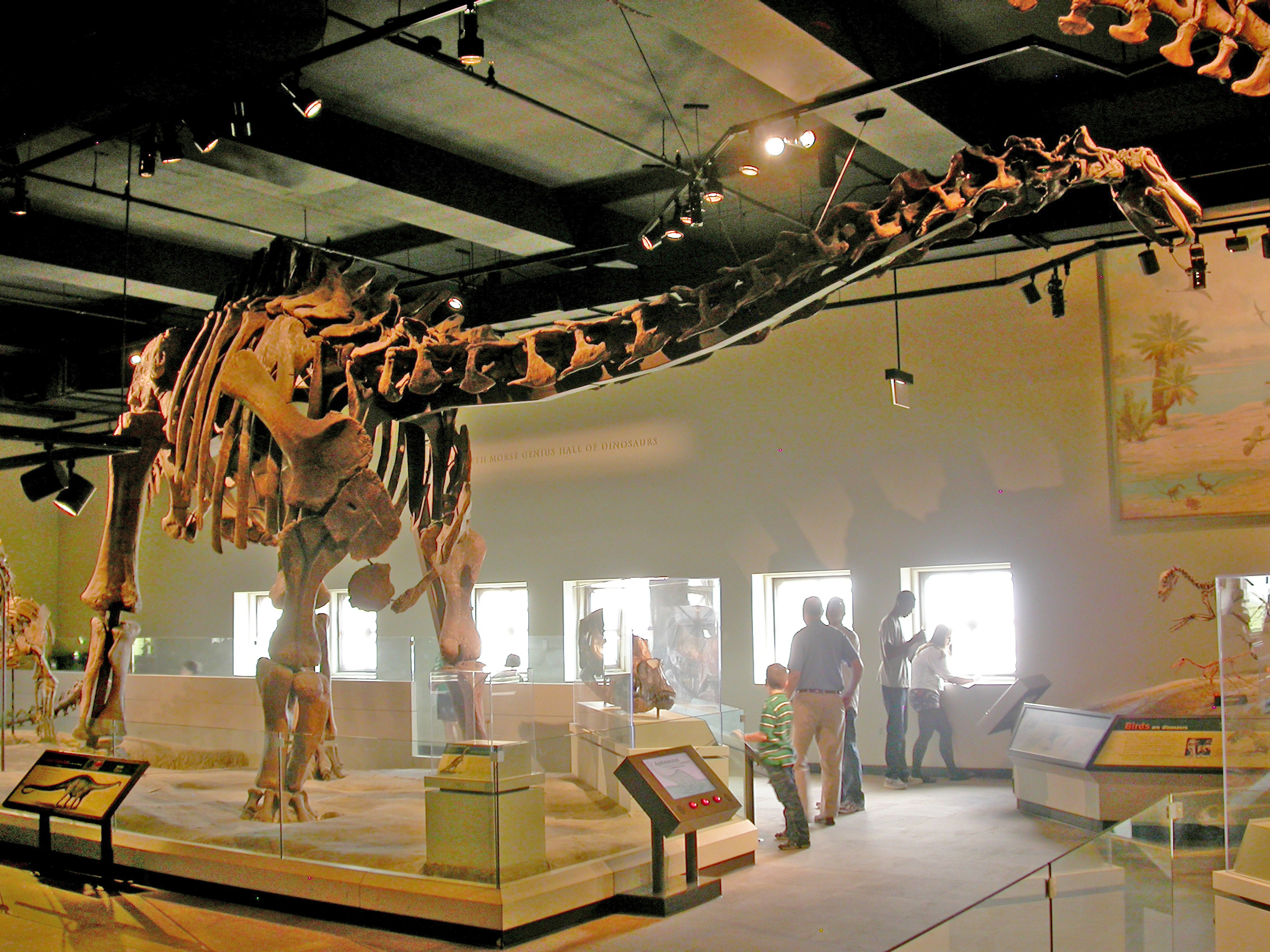
Apatosaurine mount (FMNH P25112) in the Field Museum of Natural History

It was not until 1909 that an Apatosaurus skull was found during the first expedition, led by Earl Douglass, to what would become known as the Carnegie Quarry at Dinosaur National Monument. The skull was found a short distance from a skeleton (specimen CM 3018) identified as the new species Apatosaurus louisae, named after Louise Carnegie, wife of Andrew Carnegie, who funded field research to find complete dinosaur skeletons in the American West. The skull was designated CM 11162; it was very similar to the skull of Diplodocus. Another smaller skeleton of A. louisae was found nearby CM 11162 and CM 3018. The skull was accepted as belonging to the Apatosaurus specimen by Douglass and Carnegie Museum director William H. Holland, although other scientists – most notably Osborn – rejected this identification. Holland defended his view in 1914 in an address to the Paleontological Society of America, yet he left the Carnegie Museum mount headless. While some thought Holland was attempting to avoid conflict with Osborn, others suspected Holland was waiting until an articulated skull and neck were found to confirm the association of the skull and skeleton. After Holland's death in 1934, museum staff placed a cast of a Camarasaurus skull on the mount.

While most other museums were using cast or sculpted Camarasaurus skulls on Apatosaurus mounts, the Yale Peabody Museum decided to sculpt a skull based on the lower jaw of a Camarasaurus, with the cranium based on Marsh's 1891 illustration of the skull. The skull also included forward-pointing nasals – something unusual for any dinosaur – and fenestrae differing from both the drawing and other skulls.

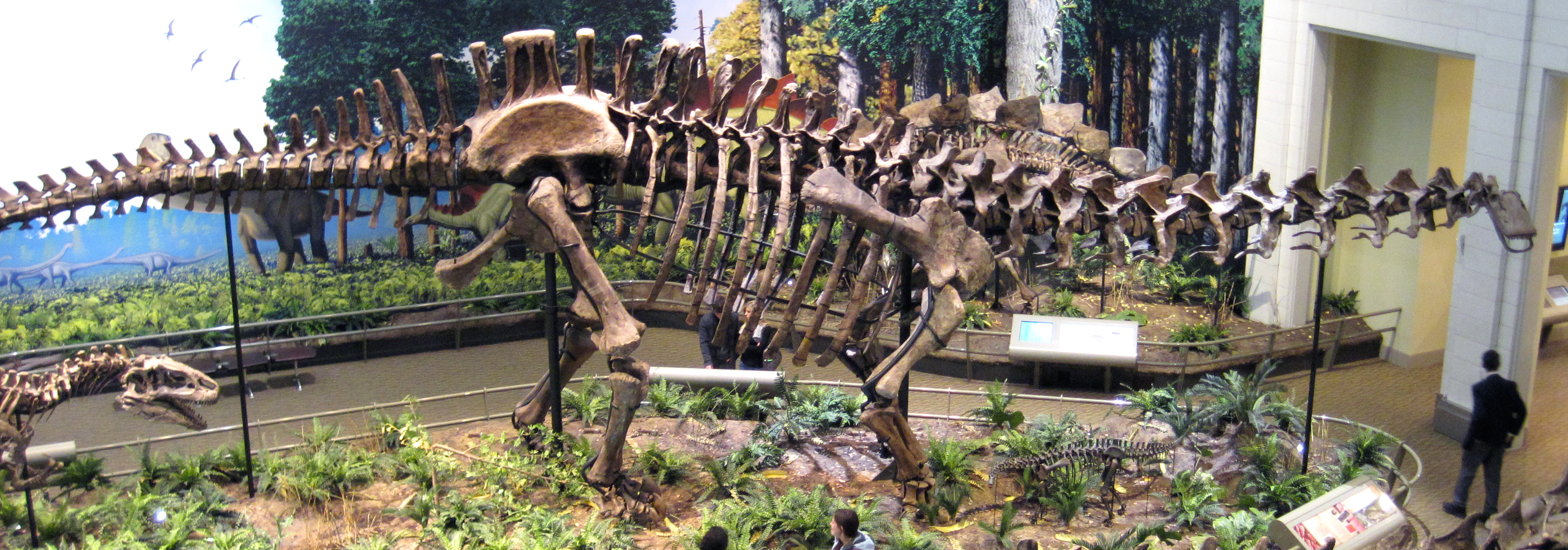
Side view of A. louisae CM 3018 mounted with a cast of skull CM 11162

No Apatosaurus skull was mentioned in literature until the 1970s when John Stanton McIntosh and David Berman redescribed the skulls of Diplodocus and Apatosaurus. They found that though he never published his opinion, Holland was almost certainly correct, that Apatosaurus had a Diplodocus-like skull. According to them, many skulls long thought to pertain to Diplodocus might instead be those of Apatosaurus. They reassigned multiple skulls to Apatosaurus based on associated and closely associated vertebrae. Even though they supported Holland, it was noted that Apatosaurus might have possessed a Camarasaurus-like skull, based on a disarticulated Camarasaurus-like tooth found at the precise site where an Apatosaurus specimen was found years before. On October 20, 1979, after the publications by McIntosh and Berman, the first true skull of Apatosaurus was mounted on a skeleton in a museum, that of the Carnegie. In 1998, it was suggested that the Felch Quarry skull that Marsh had included in his 1896 skeletal restoration instead belonged to Brachiosaurus. This was supported in 2020 with a redescription of the brachiosaurid material found at the Felch Quarry.

=== Recent discoveries and reassessment ===
In 2011, the first specimen of Apatosaurus where a skull was found articulated with its cervical vertebrae was described. This specimen, CMC VP 7180, was found to differ in both skull and neck features from A. louisae, but shared many features of the cervical vertebrae with A. ajax. Another well-preserved skull is Brigham Young University specimen 17096, a well-preserved skull and skeleton, with a preserved braincase. The specimen was found in Cactus Park Quarry in western Colorado.

Infographic explaining the history of Brontosaurus and Apatosaurus according to Tschopp et al. 2015

Almost all modern paleontologists agreed with Riggs that the two dinosaurs should be classified together in a single genus. According to the rules of the ICZN (which governs the scientific names of animals), the name Apatosaurus, having been published first, has priority as the official name; Brontosaurus was considered a junior synonym and was therefore long discarded from formal use. Despite this, at least one paleontologist – Robert T. Bakker – argued in the 1990s that A. ajax and A. excelsus were in fact sufficiently distinct for the latter to merit a separate genus.

In 2015, Emanuel Tschopp, Octávio Mateus, and Roger Benson released a paper on diplodocoid systematics, and proposed that genera could be diagnosed by thirteen differing characters, and species separated based on six. The minimum number for generic separation was chosen based on the fact that A. ajax and A. louisae differ in twelve characters, and Diplodocus carnegiei and D. hallorum differ in eleven characters. Thus, thirteen characters were chosen to validate the separation of genera. The six differing features for specific separation were chosen by counting the number of differing features in separate specimens generally agreed to represent one species, with only one differing character in D. carnegiei and A. louisae, but five differing features in B. excelsus. Therefore, Tschopp et al. argued that Apatosaurus excelsus, originally classified as Brontosaurus excelsus, had enough morphological differences from other species of Apatosaurus that it warranted being reclassified as a separate genus again. The conclusion was based on a comparison of 477 morphological characteristics across 81 different dinosaur individuals. Among the many notable differences are the wider – and presumably stronger – neck of Apatosaurus species compared to B. excelsus. Other species previously assigned to Apatosaurus, such as Elosaurus parvus and Eobrontosaurus yahnahpin were also reclassified as Brontosaurus. Some features proposed to separate Brontosaurus from Apatosaurus include: posterior dorsal vertebrae with the centrum longer than wide; the scapula rear to the acromial edge and the distal blade being excavated; the acromial edge of the distal scapular blade bearing a rounded expansion; and the ratio of the proximodistal length to transverse breadth of the astragalus 0.55 or greater. Sauropod expert Michael D'Emic pointed out that the criteria chosen were to an extent arbitrary and that they would require abandoning the name Brontosaurus again if newer analyzes obtained different results. Mammal paleontologist Donald Prothero criticized the mass media reaction to this study as superficial and premature, concluding that he would keep "Brontosaurus" in quotes and not treat the name as a valid genus.

=== Valid species ===
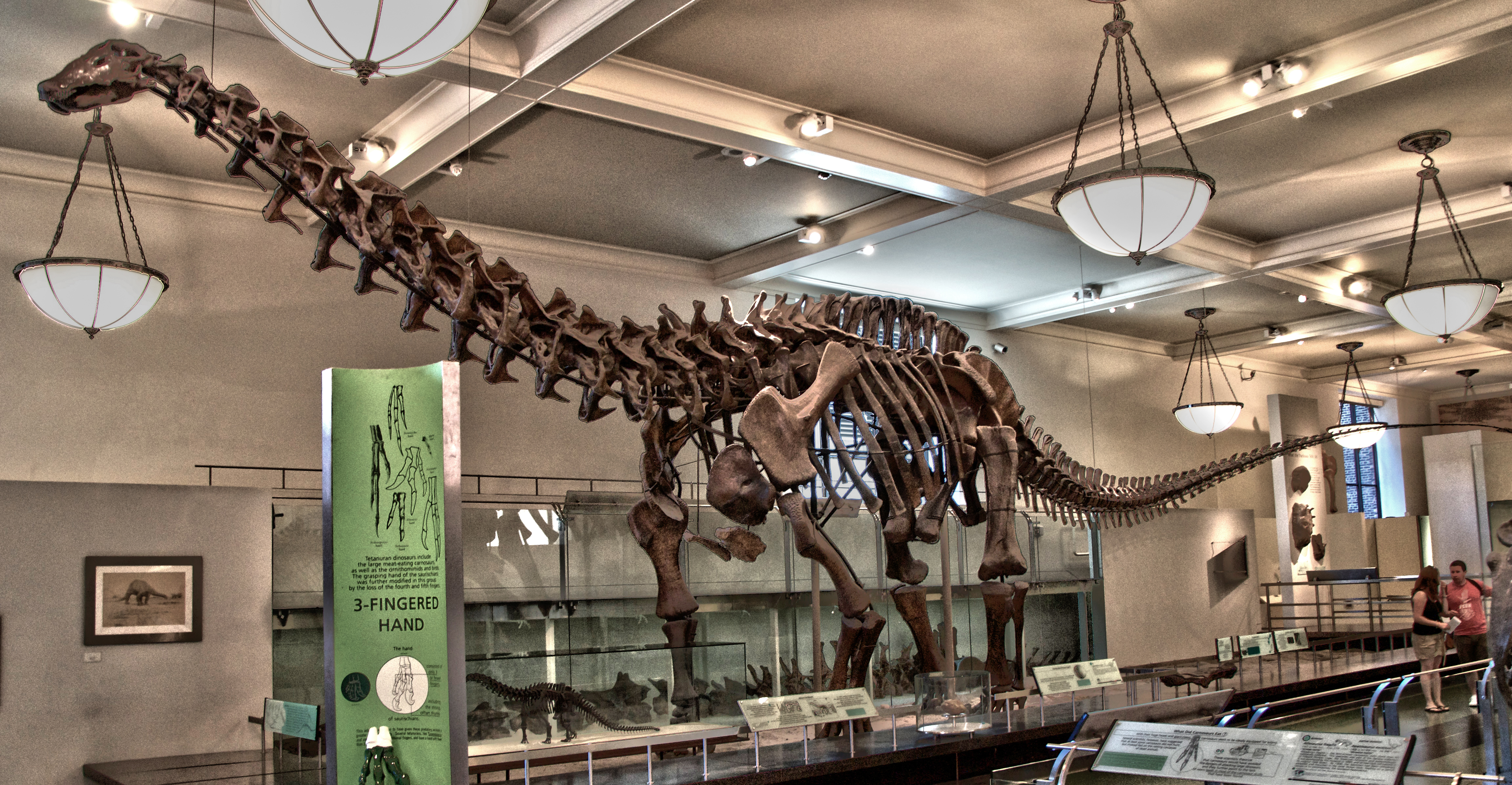
Apatosaurine specimen AMNH 460 at the AMNH as re-mounted in 1995

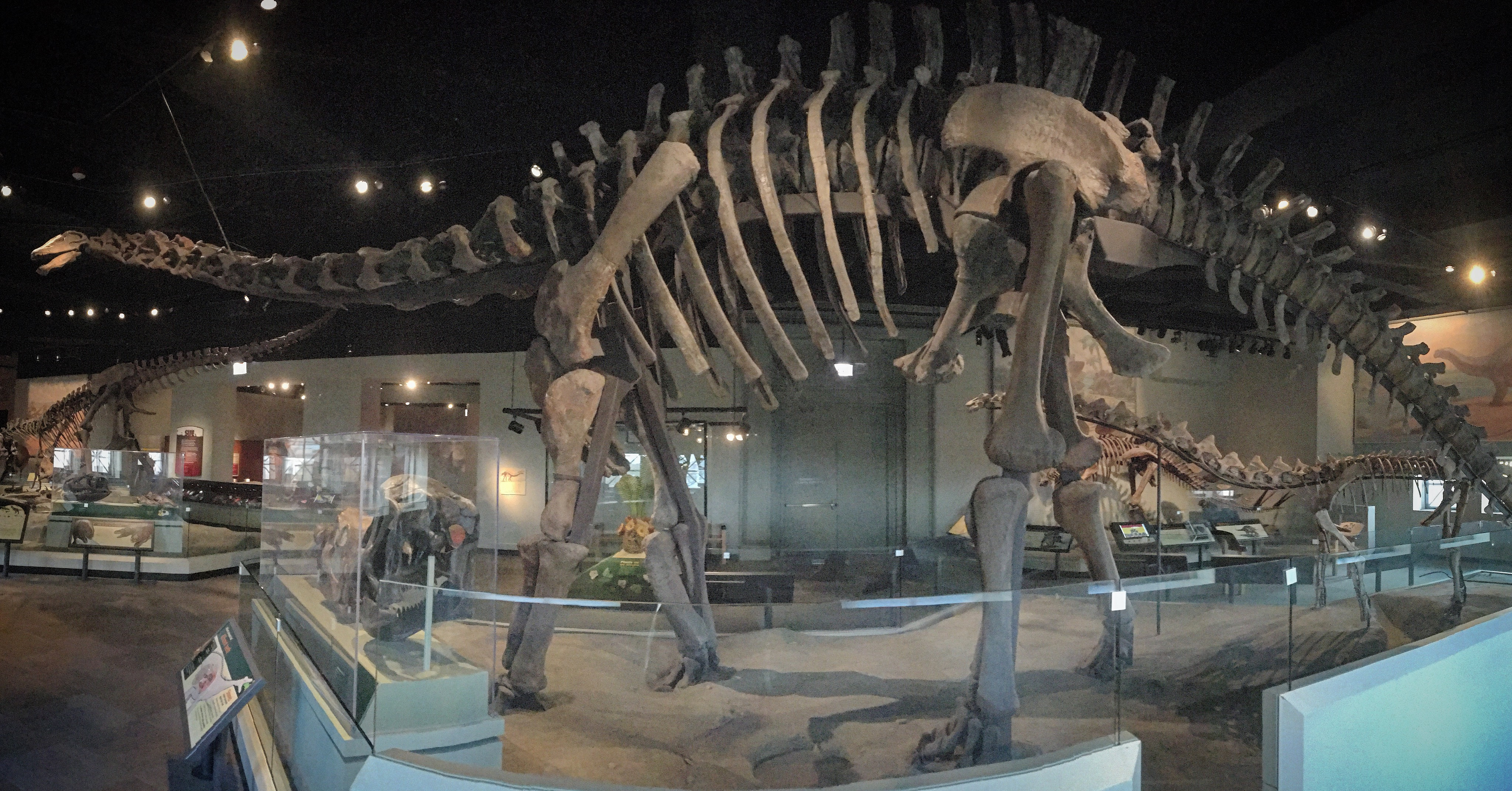
Apatosaurine mount (FMNH P25112) in the FMNH

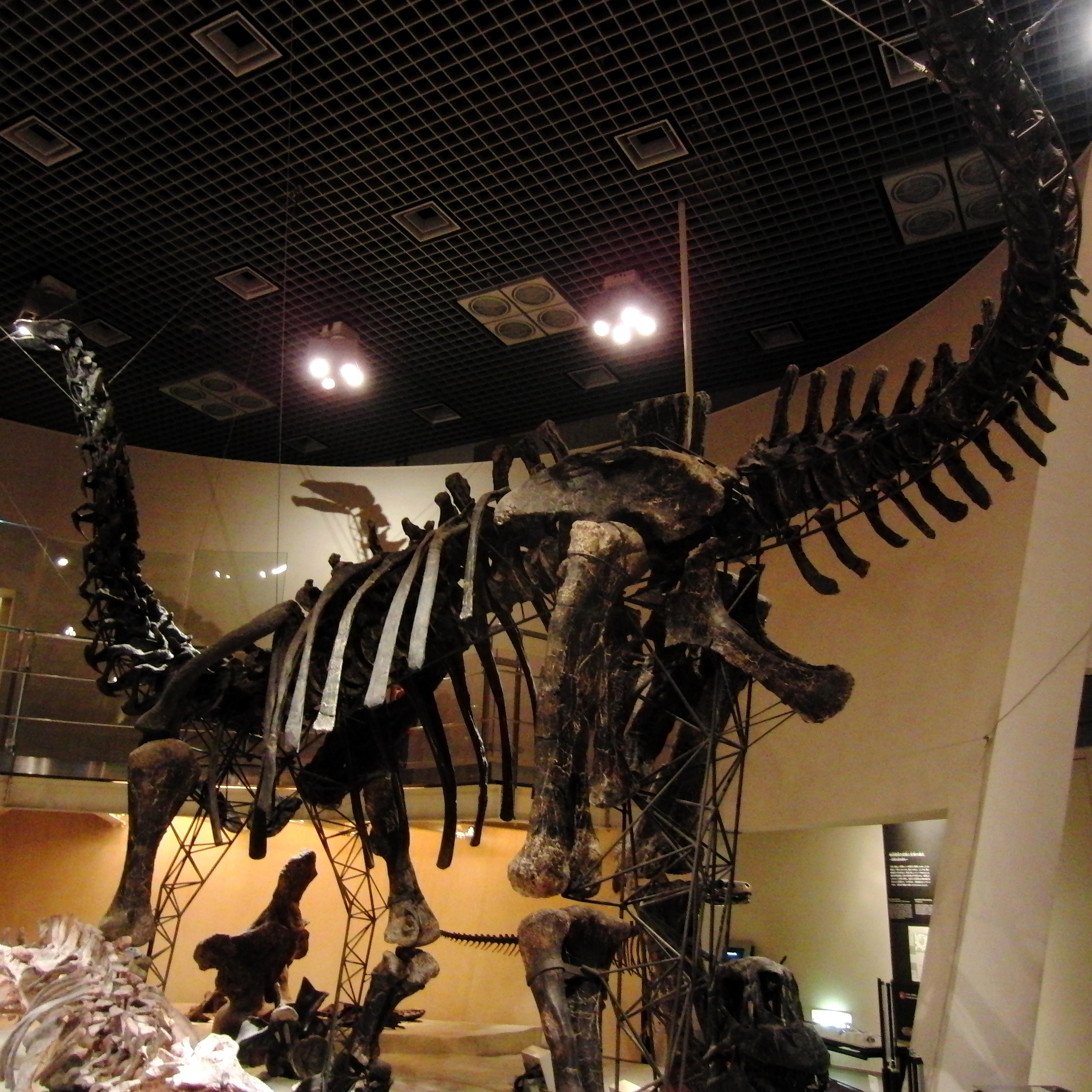
NSMT-PV 20375 is a highly complete apatosaurine specimen, although the forelimbs may be from a different animal, possibly not even of the same species. It may represent Apatosaurus ajax or a new species; it is most similar to the type of "Atlantosaurus" immanis.

Many species of Apatosaurus have been designated from scant material. Marsh named as many species as he could, which resulted in many being based upon fragmentary and indistinguishable remains. In 2005, Paul Upchurch and colleagues published a study that analyzed the species and specimen relationships of Apatosaurus. They found that A. louisae was the most basal species, followed by FMNH P25112, and then a polytomy of A. ajax, A. parvus, and A. excelsus. Their analysis was revised and expanded with many additional diplodocid specimens in 2015, which resolved the relationships of Apatosaurus slightly differently, and also supported separating Brontosaurus from Apatosaurus.

- Apatosaurus ajax was named by Marsh in 1877 after Ajax, a hero from Greek mythology. Marsh designated the incomplete, juvenile skeleton YPM 1860 as its holotype. The species is less studied than Brontosaurus and A. louisae, especially because of the incomplete nature of the holotype. In 2005, many specimens in addition to the holotype were found assignable to A. ajax, YPM 1840, NSMT-PV 20375, YPM 1861, and AMNH 460. The specimens date from the late Kimmeridgian to the early Tithonian ages. In 2015, only the A. ajax holotype YPM 1860 assigned to the species, with AMNH 460 found either to be within Brontosaurus, or potentially its own taxon. However, YPM 1861 and NSMT-PV 20375 only differed in a few characteristics, and cannot be distinguished specifically or generically from A. ajax. YPM 1861 is the holotype of "Atlantosaurus" immanis, which means it might be a junior synonym of A. ajax.
- Apatosaurus louisae was named by Holland in 1916, being first known from a partial skeleton that was found in Utah. The holotype is CM 3018, with referred specimens including CM 3378, CM 11162, and LACM 52844. The former two consist of a vertebral column; the latter two consist of a skull and a nearly complete skeleton, respectively. Apatosaurus louisae specimens all come from the late Kimmeridgian of Dinosaur National Monument. In 2015, Tschopp et al. found the type specimen of Apatosaurus laticollis to nest closely with CM 3018, meaning the former is likely a junior synonym of A. louisae.

The cladogram below is the result of an analysis by Tschopp, Mateus, and Benson (2015). The authors analyzed most diplodocid type specimens separately to deduce which specimen belonged to which species and genus.

- Apatosaurinae
  - - YPM 1840 ("Atlantosaurus" immanis type)
    - NSMT-PV 20375
  - - AMNH 460
    - - Apatosaurus
        - Apatosaurus ajax
          YPM 1860 (Apatosaurus ajax type)
        - Apatosaurus louisae
          - CM 3018 (Apatosaurus louisae type)
          - YPM 1861 (Apatosaurus laticollis type)
      - Brontosaurus
        - Brontosaurus excelsus
          - YPM 1980 (Brontosaurus excelsus type)
          - YPM 1981 (Brontosaurus amplus type)
        - - AMNH 5764 (Amphicoelias altus type)
          - - FMNH P25112
            - - Brontosaurus yahnahpin
                Tate-001 (Eobrontosaurus yahnahpin type)
              - Brontosaurus parvus
                - CM 566 (Elosaurus parvus type)
                - - UM 15556
                  - BYU 1252-18531

=== Reassigned species ===
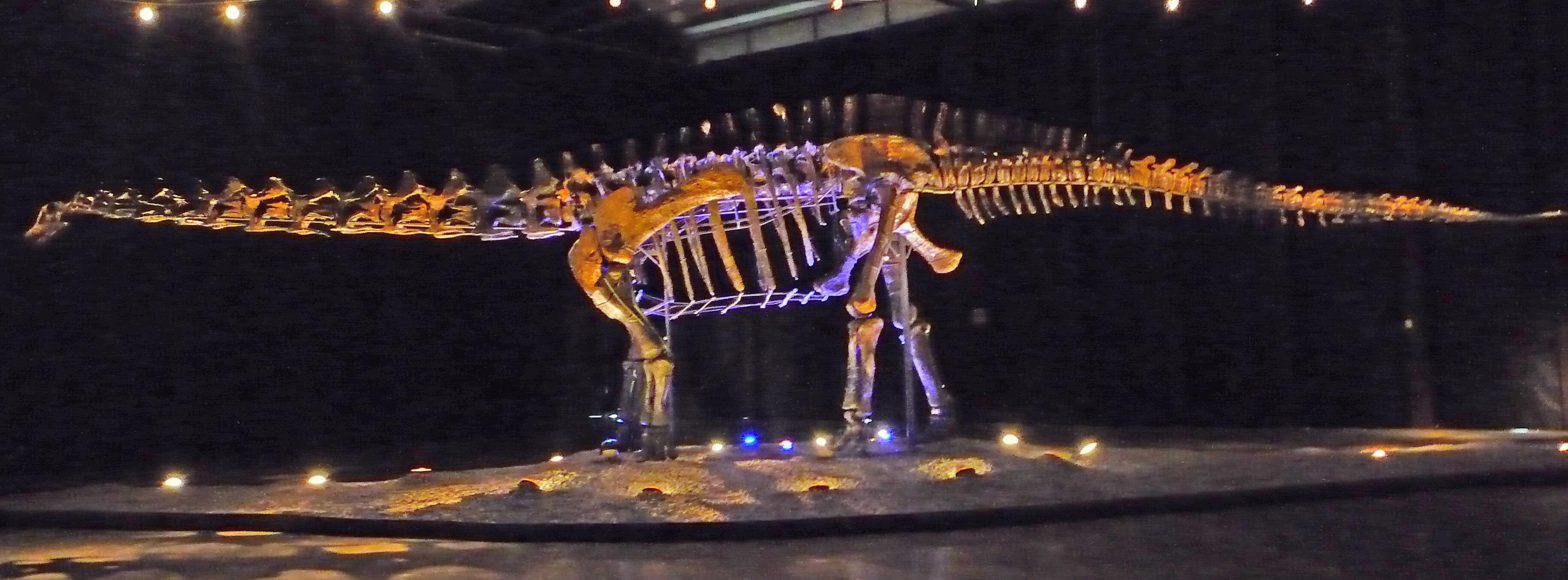
The most complete specimen known to date, A. sp. BYU 17096 nicknamed "Einstein"

- Apatosaurus grandis was named in 1877 by Marsh in the article that described A. ajax. It was briefly described, figured, and diagnosed. Marsh later mentioned it was only provisionally assigned to Apatosaurus when he reassigned it to his new genus Morosaurus in 1878. Since Morosaurus has been considered a synonym of Camarasaurus, C. grandis is the oldest-named species of the latter genus.
- Apatosaurus excelsus was the original type species of Brontosaurus, first named by Marsh in 1879. Elmer Riggs reclassified Brontosaurus as a synonym of Apatosaurus in 1903, transferring the species B. excelsus to A. excelsus. In 2015, Tschopp, Mateus, and Benson argued that the species was distinct enough to be placed in its own genus, so they reclassified it back into Brontosaurus.
- Apatosaurus parvus, first described from a juvenile specimen as Elosaurus in 1902 by Peterson and Gilmore, was reassigned to Apatosaurus in 1994, and then to Brontosaurus in 2015. Many other, more mature specimens were assigned to it following the 2015 study.
- Apatosaurus minimus was originally described as a specimen of Brontosaurus sp. in 1904 by Osborn. In 1917, Henry Mook named it as its own species, A. minimus, for a pair of ilia and their sacrum. In 2012, Mike P. Taylor and Matt J. Wedel published a short abstract describing the material of A. minimus, finding it hard to place among either Diplodocoidea or Macronaria. While it was placed with Saltasaurus in a phylogenetic analysis, it was thought to represent instead some form with convergent features from many groups. The study of Tschopp et al. did find that a camarasaurid position for the taxon was supported, but noted that the position of the taxon was found to be highly variable and there was no clearly more likely position.
- Apatosaurus alenquerensis was named in 1957 by Albert-Félix de Lapparent and Georges Zbyweski. It was based on post cranial material from Portugal. In 1990, this material was reassigned to Camarasaurus, but in 1998 it was given its own genus, Lourinhasaurus. This was further supported by the findings of Tschopp et al. in 2015, where Lourinhasaurus was found to be sister to Camarasaurus and other camarasaurids.
- Apatosaurus yahnahpin was named by James Filla and Patrick Redman in 1994. Bakker made A. yahnahpin the type species of a new genus, Eobrontosaurus in 1998, and Tschopp reclassified it as Brontosaurus yahnahpin in 2015.

== Classification ==
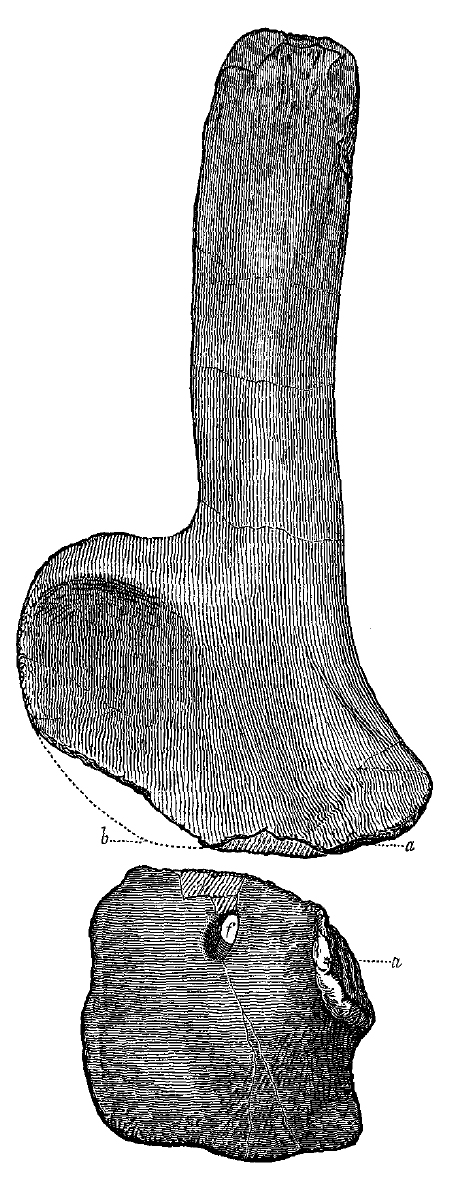
Shoulder blade and coracoid of A. ajax

Apatosaurus is a member of the family Diplodocidae, a clade of gigantic sauropod dinosaurs. The family includes some of the longest creatures ever to walk the earth, including Diplodocus, Supersaurus, and Barosaurus. Apatosaurus is sometimes classified in the subfamily Apatosaurinae, which may also include Suuwassea, Supersaurus, and Brontosaurus. Othniel Charles Marsh described Apatosaurus as allied to Atlantosaurus within the now-defunct group Atlantosauridae. In 1878, Marsh raised his family to the rank of suborder, including Apatosaurus, Atlantosaurus, Morosaurus (=Camarasaurus) and Diplodocus. He classified this group within Sauropoda, a group he erected in the same study. In 1903, Elmer S. Riggs said the name Sauropoda would be a junior synonym of earlier names; he grouped Apatosaurus within Opisthocoelia. Sauropoda is still used as the group name. In 2011, John Whitlock published a study that placed Apatosaurus a more basal diplodocid, sometimes less basal than Supersaurus.

Cladogram of the Diplodocidae after Tschopp, Mateus, and Benson (2015).

- Diplodocidae
  - Amphicoelias altus
  - - Apatosaurinae
      - Unnamed species
      - - - Apatosaurus ajax
          - Apatosaurus louisae
        - - Brontosaurus excelsus
          - - Brontosaurus yahnahpin
            - Brontosaurus parvus
    - Diplodocinae
      - Unnamed species
      - - Tornieria africana
        - - - Dinheirosaurus lourinhanensis
            - Supersaurus vivianae
          - - Leinkupal laticauda
            - - Galeamopus hayi
              - - - Diplodocus carnegii
                  - Diplodocus hallorum
                - - Kaatedocus siberi
                  - Barosaurus lentus

== Paleobiology ==
Paleoenvironment and dinosaurs of the Morrison Formation, with A. louisae at left

It was believed throughout the 19th and early 20th centuries that sauropods like Apatosaurus were too massive to support their own weight on dry land. It was theorized that they lived partly submerged in water, perhaps in swamps. More recent findings do not support this; sauropods are now thought to have been fully terrestrial animals. A study of diplodocid snouts showed that the square snout, large proportion of pits, and fine, subparallel scratches of the teeth of Apatosaurus suggests it was a ground-height, nonselective browser. It may have eaten ferns, cycadeoids, seed ferns, horsetails, and algae. Stevens and Parish (2005) speculate that these sauropods fed from riverbanks on submerged water plants.

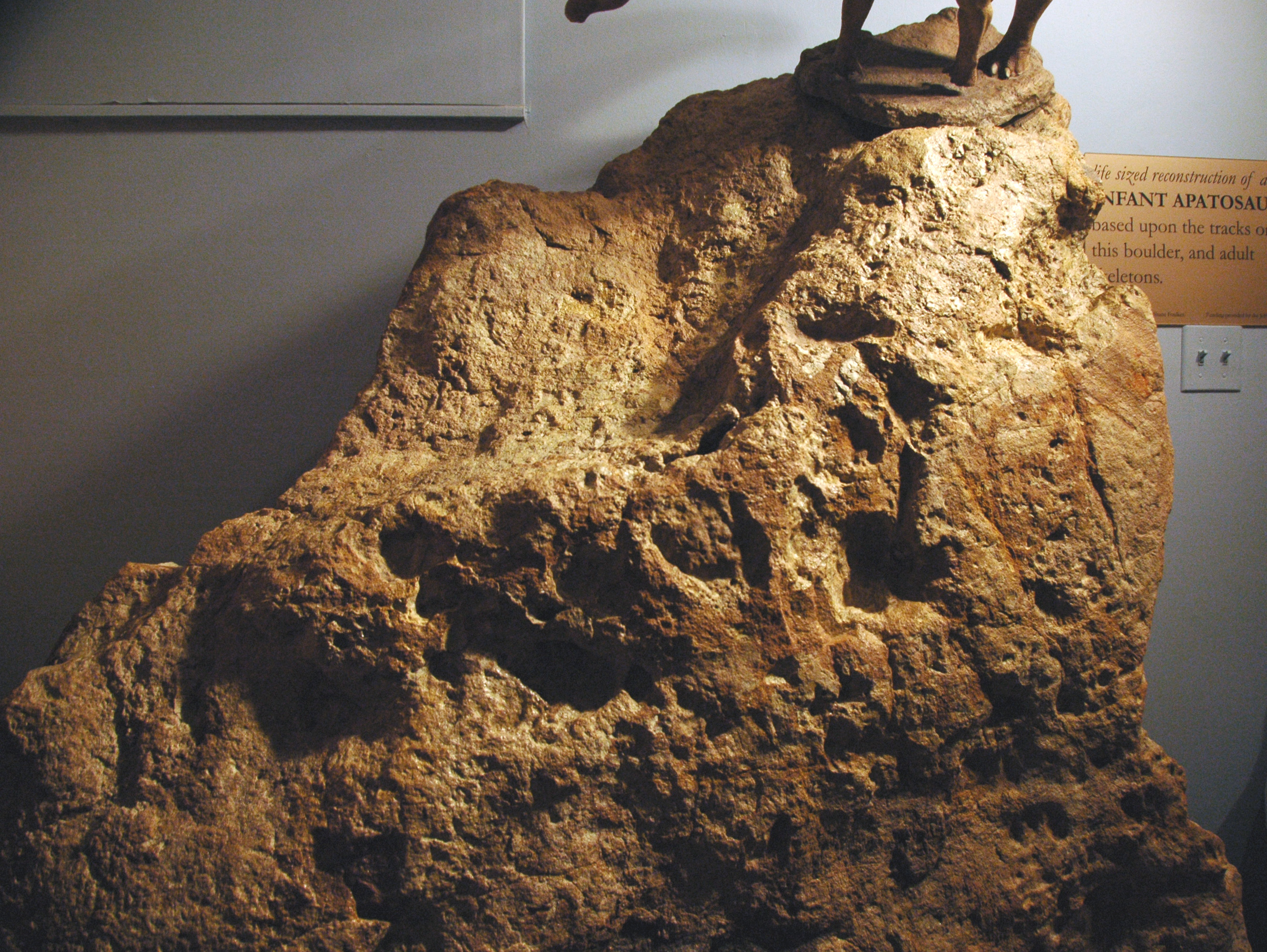
Tracks of a juvenile

A 2015 study of the necks of Apatosaurus and Brontosaurus found many differences between them and other diplodocids, and that these variations may have shown that the necks of Apatosaurus and Brontosaurus were used for intraspecific combat. Various uses for the single claw on the forelimb of sauropods have been proposed. One suggestion is that they were used for defense, but their shape and size make this unlikely. It was also possible they were for feeding, but the most probable use for the claw was grasping objects such as tree trunks when rearing.

Trackways of sauropods like Apatosaurus show that they may have had a range of around 25–40 km (16–25 miles) per day, and that they could potentially have reached a top speed of 20–30 km (12–19 miles) per hour. The slow locomotion of sauropods may be due to their minimal muscling, or to recoil after strides. A trackway of a juvenile has led some to believe that they were capable of bipedalism, though this is disputed.

=== Neck posture ===
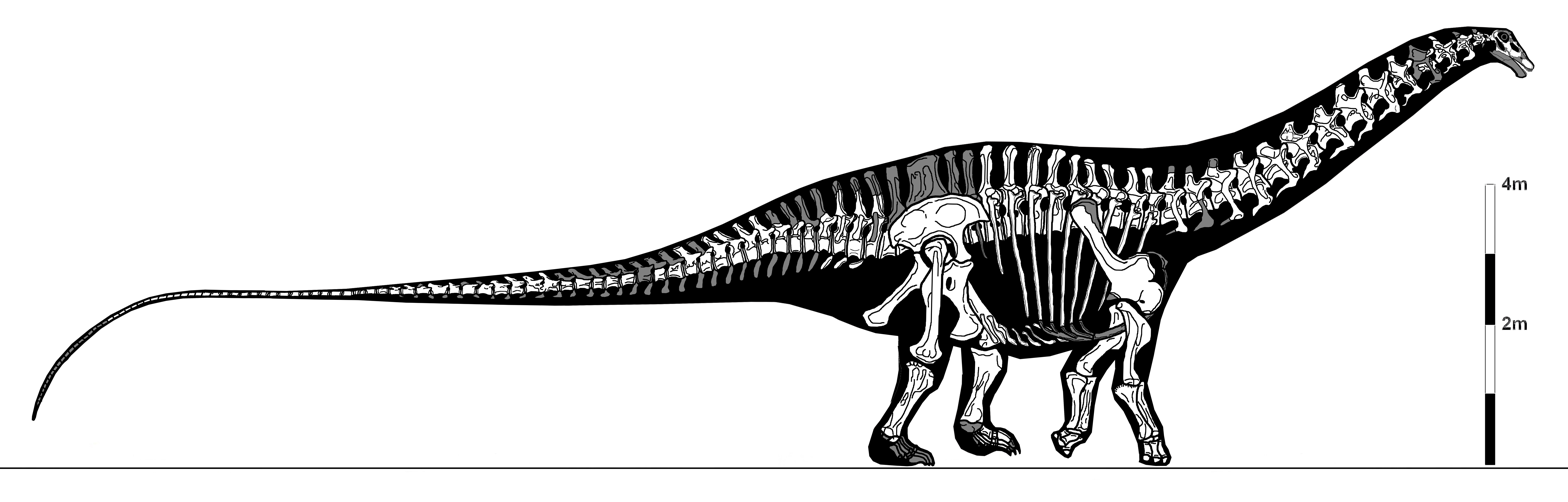
Skeletal diagram of A. louisae, showing the neck held high

Diplodocids like Apatosaurus are often portrayed with their necks held high up in the air, allowing them to browse on tall trees. Some studies state diplodocid necks were less flexible than previously believed, because the structure of the neck vertebrae would not have allowed the neck to bend far upward, and that sauropods like Apatosaurus were adapted to low browsing or ground feeding.

Other studies by Taylor find that all tetrapods appear to hold their necks at the maximum possible vertical extension when in a normal, alert posture; they argue the same would hold true for sauropods barring any unknown, unique characteristics that set the soft tissue anatomy of their necks apart from that of other animals. Apatosaurus, like Diplodocus, would have held its neck angled upward with the head pointing downward in a resting posture. Kent Stevens and Michael Parrish (1999 and 2005) state Apatosaurus had a great feeding range; its neck could bend into a U-shape laterally. The neck's range of movement would have also allowed the head to feed at the level of the feet.

Matthew Cobley et al. (2013) dispute this, finding that large muscles and cartilage would have limited movement of the neck. They state the feeding ranges for sauropods like Diplodocus were smaller than previously believed, and the animals may have had to move their whole bodies around to better access areas where they could browse vegetation. As such, they might have spent more time foraging to meet their minimum energy needs. The conclusions of Cobley et al. are disputed by Taylor, who analyzed the amount and positioning of intervertebral cartilage to determine the flexibility of the neck of Apatosaurus and Diplodocus. He found that the neck of Apatosaurus was very flexible.

=== Physiology ===
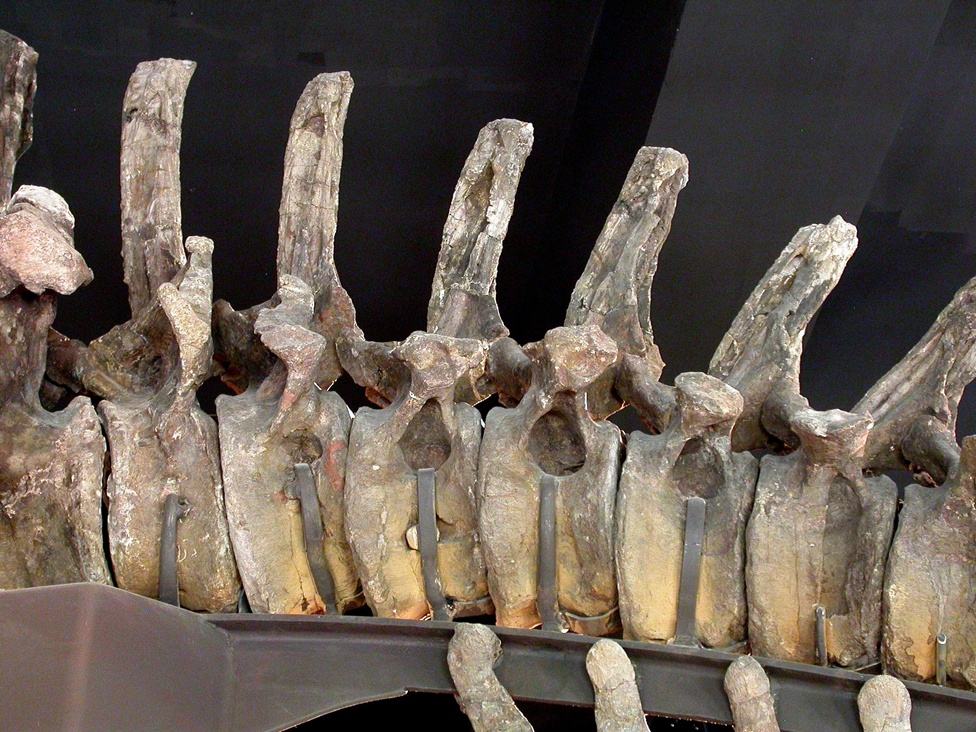
Tail vertebrae of specimen FMNH P25112, showing pneumatic fossae (holes)

Given the large body mass and long neck of sauropods like Apatosaurus, physiologists have encountered problems determining how these animals breathed. Beginning with the assumption that, like crocodilians, Apatosaurus did not have a diaphragm, the dead-space volume (the amount of unused air remaining in the mouth, trachea, and air tubes after each breath) has been estimated at 0.184 m^{3} (184 L) for a 30 t (30 long tons; 33 short tons) specimen. Paladino calculates its tidal volume (the amount of air moved in or out during a single breath) at 0.904 m^{3} (904 L) with an avian respiratory system, 0.225 m^{3} (225 L) if mammalian, and 0.019 m^{3} (19 L) if reptilian.

On this basis, its respiratory system would likely have been parabronchi, with multiple pulmonary air sacs as in avian lungs, and a flow-through lung. An avian respiratory system would need a lung volume of about 0.60 m^{3} (600 L) compared with a mammalian requirement of 2.95 m^{3} (2,950 L), which would exceed the space available. The overall thoracic volume of Apatosaurus has been estimated at 1.7 m^{3} (1,700 L), allowing for a 0.50 m^{3} (500 L), four-chambered heart and a 0.90 m^{3} (900 L) lung capacity. That would allow about 0.30 m^{3} (300 L) for the necessary tissue. Evidence for the avian system in Apatosaurus and other sauropods is also present in the pneumaticity of the vertebrae. Though this plays a role in reducing the weight of the animal, Wedel (2003) states they are also likely connected to air sacs, as in birds.

James Spotila et al. (1991) concludes that the large body size of sauropods would have made them unable to maintain high metabolic rates because they would not have been able to release enough heat. They assumed sauropods had a reptilian respiratory system. Wedel says that an avian system would have allowed it to dump more heat. Some scientists state that the heart would have had trouble sustaining sufficient blood pressure to oxygenate the brain. Others suggest that the near-horizontal posture of the head and neck would have eliminated the problem of supplying blood to the brain because it would not have been elevated.

James Farlow (1987) calculates that an Apatosaurus-sized dinosaur about 35 t (34 long tons; 39 short tons) would have possessed 5.7 t (5.6 long tons; 6.3 short tons) of fermentation contents, though he cautions that the regression equation being used is based on living mammals which are much smaller and physiologically different. Assuming Apatosaurus had an avian respiratory system and a reptilian resting-metabolism, Frank Paladino et al. (1997) estimate the animal would have needed to consume only about 262 litres (58 imp gal; 69 US gal) of water per day.

=== Growth ===
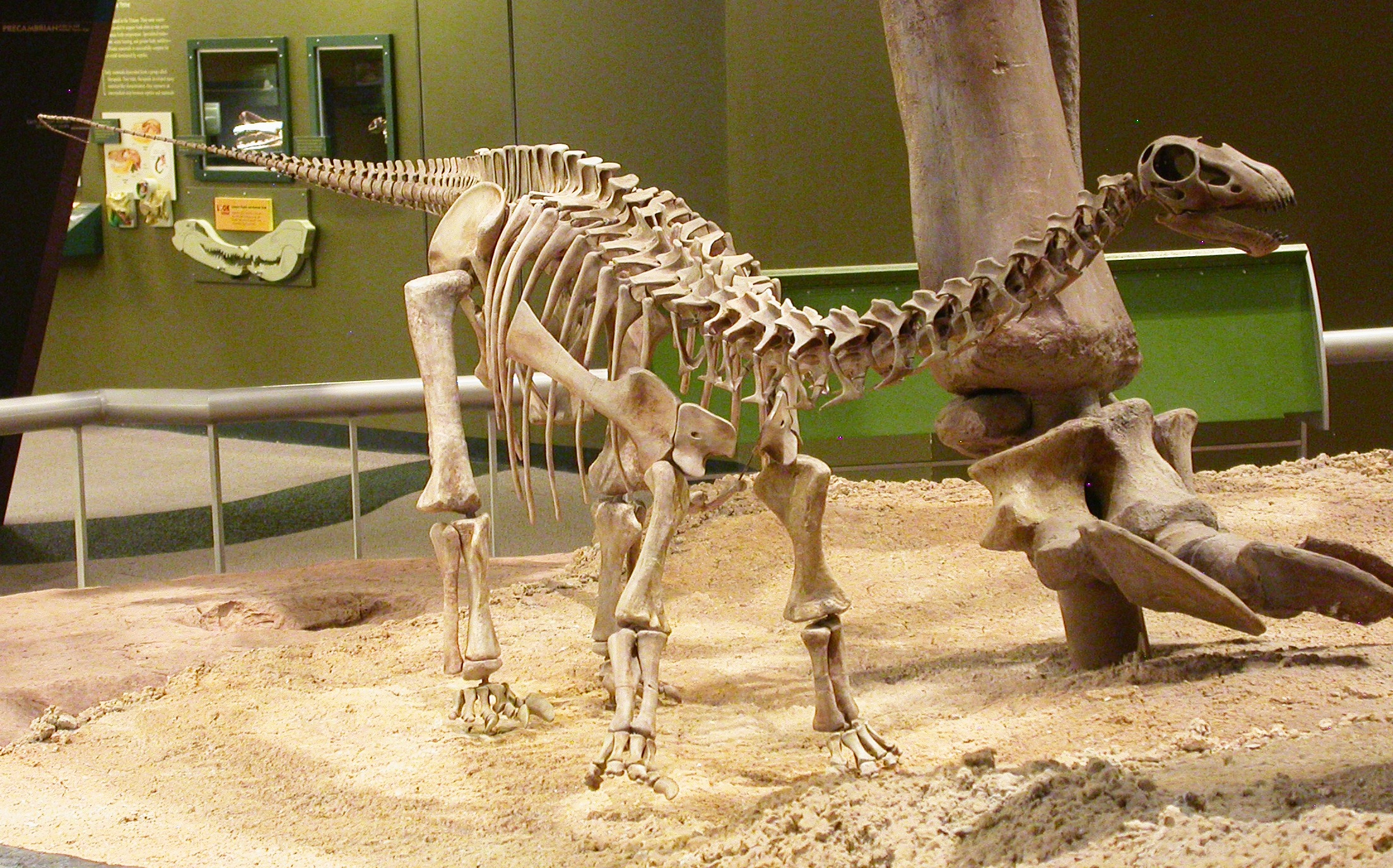
Juvenile A. sp. mount, Sam Noble Oklahoma Museum of Natural History

A 1999 microscopic study of Apatosaurus and Brontosaurus bones concluded the animals grew rapidly when young and reached near-adult sizes in about 10 years. In 2008, a study on the growth rates of sauropods was published by Thomas Lehman and Holly Woodward. They said that by using growth lines and length-to-mass ratios, Apatosaurus would have grown to 25 t (25 long tons; 28 short tons) in 15 years, with growth peaking at 5,000 kg (11,000 lb) in a single year. An alternative method, using limb length and body mass, found Apatosaurus grew 520 kg (1,150 lb) per year, and reached its full mass before it was about 70 years old. These estimates have been called unreliable because the calculation methods are not sound; old growth lines would have been obliterated by bone remodeling. One of the first identified growth factors of Apatosaurus was the number of sacral vertebrae, which increased to five by the time of the creature's maturity. This was first noted in 1903 and again in 1936.

Long-bone histology enables researchers to estimate the age that a specific individual reached. A study by Eva Griebeler et al. (2013) examined long-bone histological data and concluded the Apatosaurus sp. SMA 0014 weighed 20,206 kg (22.3 short tons), reached sexual maturity at 21 years, and died aged 28. The same growth model indicated Apatosaurus sp. BYU 601–17328 weighed 18,178 kg (20.0 short tons), reached sexual maturity at 19 years, and died aged 31.

==== Juveniles ====
Compared with most sauropods, a relatively large amount of juvenile material is known from Apatosaurus. Multiple specimens in the OMNH are from juveniles of an undetermined species of Apatosaurus; this material includes partial shoulder and pelvic girdles, some vertebrae, and limb bones. OMNH juvenile material is from at least two different age groups and based on overlapping bones likely comes from more than three individuals. The specimens exhibit features that distinguish Apatosaurus from its relatives, and thus likely belong to the genus. Juvenile sauropods tend to have proportionally shorter necks and tails, and a more pronounced forelimb-hindlimb disparity than found in adult sauropods.

=== Tail ===
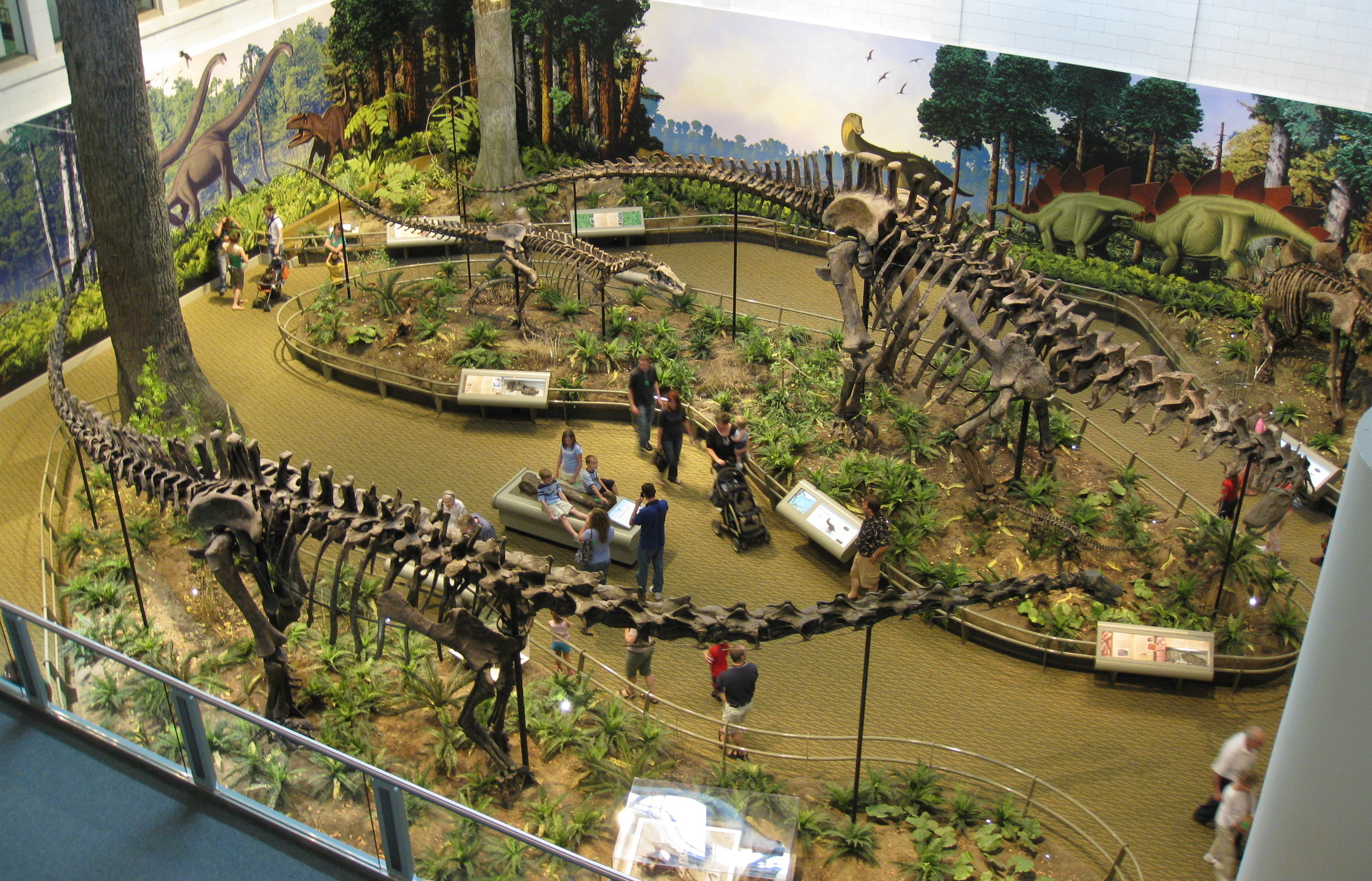
Carnegie A. louisae mount (upper right), showing the long, tapering tail

The estimated tail length of Apatosaurus is approximately 54% of the total body length, with the tail sometimes hypothesized to be capable of functioning like a very long, tapering bullwhip. An article published in 1997 reported research of the mechanics of Apatosaurus tails through computer simulation by Nathan Myhrvold and paleontologist Philip J. Currie. This computer modeling suggested diplodocids were capable of producing a whiplike cracking sound of over 200 decibels, comparable to the volume of a cannon being fired.

A pathology has been identified on the tail of Apatosaurus, caused by a growth defect. Two caudal vertebrae are seamlessly fused along the entire articulating surface of the bone, including the arches of the neural spines. This defect might have been caused by the lack or inhibition of the substance that forms intervertebral disks or joints. It has been proposed that the whips could have been used in combat and defense, but the tails of diplodocids were quite light and narrow compared to Shunosaurus and mamenchisaurids, and thus to injure another animal with the tail would severely injure the tail itself. More recently, Baron (2020) considers the use of the tail as a bullwhip unlikely because of the potentially catastrophic muscle and skeletal damage such speeds could cause on the large and heavy tail. Instead, he proposes that the tails might have been used as a tactile organ to keep in touch with the individuals behind and on the sides in a group while migrating, which could have augmented cohesion and allowed communication among individuals while limiting more energetically demanding activities like stopping to search for dispersed individuals, turning to visually check on individuals behind, or communicating vocally.

== Paleoecology ==
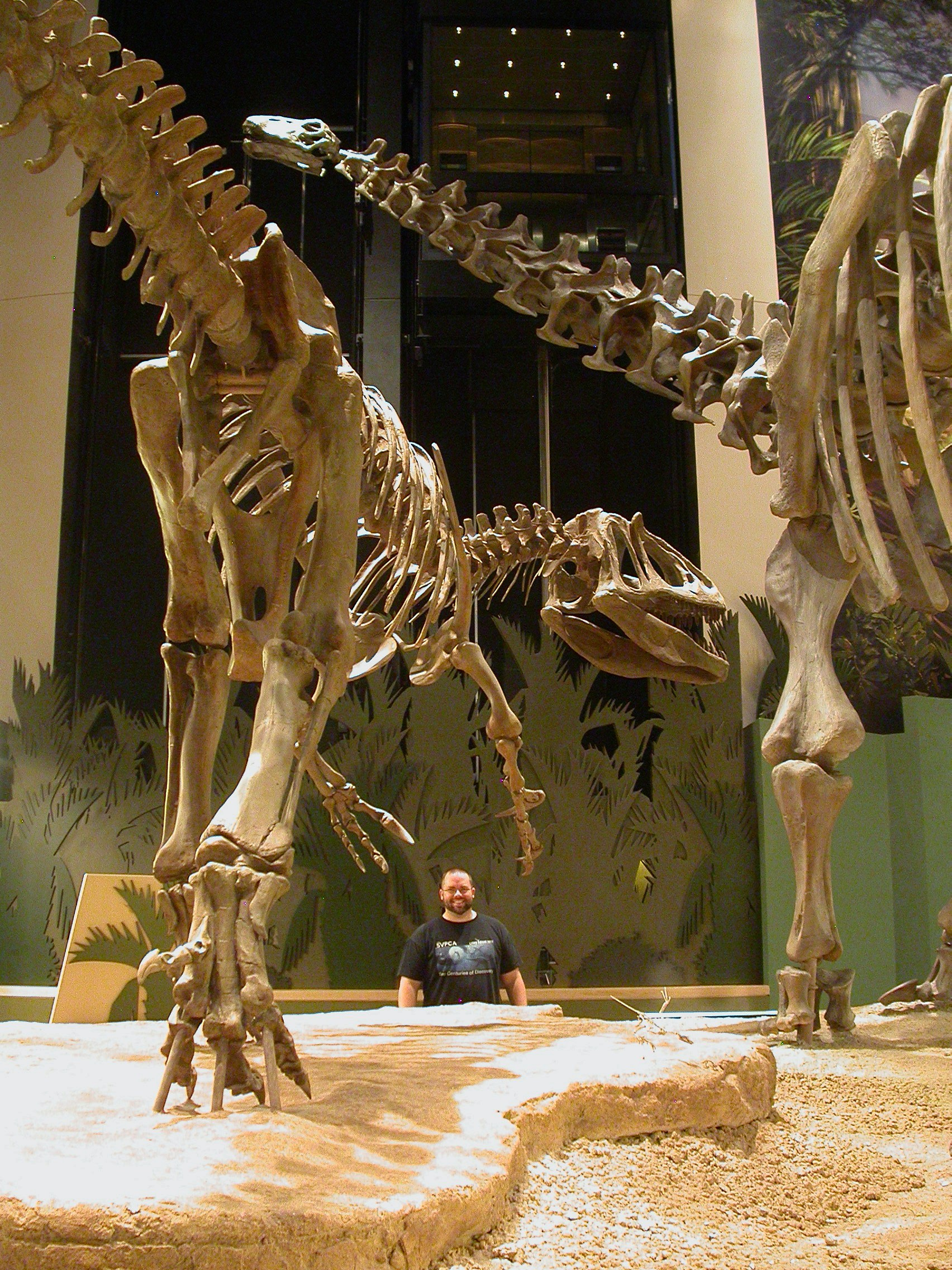
Allosaurus and A. sp., Sam Noble Oklahoma Museum of Natural History

The Morrison Formation is a sequence of shallow marine and alluvial sediments which, according to radiometric dating, dates from between 156.3 mya at its base, and 146.8 mya at the top, placing it in the late Oxfordian, Kimmeridgian, and early Tithonian stages of the Late Jurassic period. This formation is interpreted as originating in a locally semiarid environment with distinct wet and dry seasons. The Morrison Basin, where dinosaurs lived, stretched from New Mexico to Alberta and Saskatchewan; it was formed when the precursors to the Front Range of the Rocky Mountains started pushing up to the west. The deposits from their east-facing drainage basins were carried by streams and rivers and deposited in swampy lowlands, lakes, river channels, and floodplains. This formation is similar in age to the Lourinhã Formation in Portugal and the Tendaguru Formation in Tanzania.

Apatosaurus was the second most common sauropod in the Morrison Formation ecosystem, after Camarasaurus. Apatosaurus may have been more solitary than other Morrison Formation dinosaurs. Fossils of the genus have only been found in the upper levels of the formation. Those of Apatosaurus ajax are known exclusively from the upper Brushy Basin Member, about 152–151 mya. A. louisae fossils are rare, known only from one site in the upper Brushy Basin Member; they date to the late Kimmeridgian stage, about 151 mya. Additional Apatosaurus remains are known from similarly aged or slightly younger rocks, but they have not been identified as any particular species, and thus may instead belong to Brontosaurus.

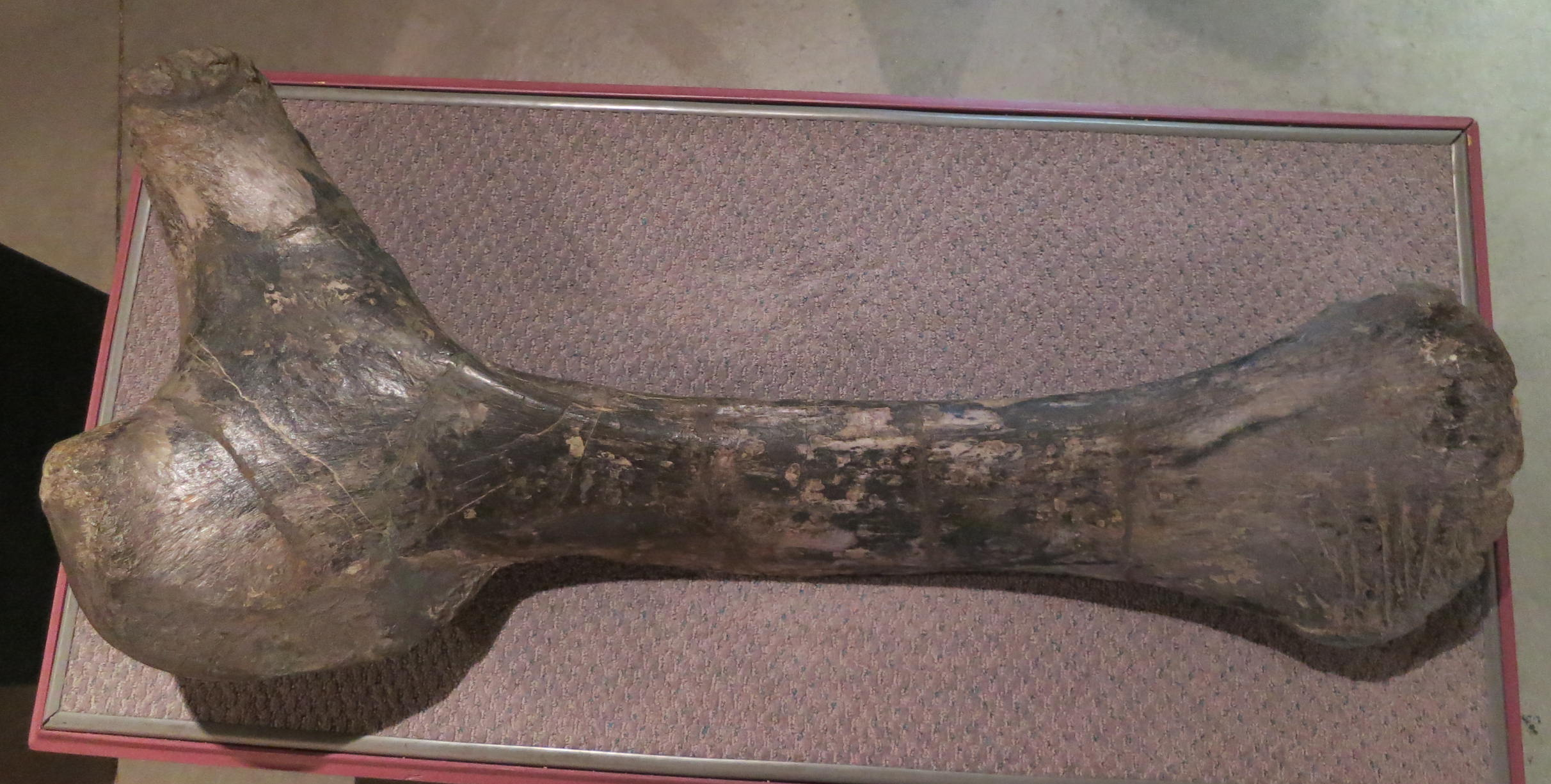
Ischium of an Apatosaurus showing bite marks from a large theropod

The Morrison Formation records a time when the local environment was dominated by gigantic sauropod dinosaurs. Dinosaurs known from the Morrison Formation include the theropods Allosaurus, Ceratosaurus, Ornitholestes, and Torvosaurus; the sauropods Brontosaurus, Brachiosaurus, Camarasaurus, and Diplodocus; and the ornithischians Camptosaurus, Dryosaurus, and Stegosaurus. Apatosaurus is commonly found at the same sites as Allosaurus, Camarasaurus, Diplodocus, and Stegosaurus. Allosaurus accounted for 70–75% of theropod specimens and was at the top trophic level of the Morrison food web. Many of the dinosaurs of the Morrison Formation are of the same genera as those seen in Portuguese rocks of the Lourinhã Formation – mainly Allosaurus, Ceratosaurus, and Torvosaurus – or have a close counterpart – Brachiosaurus and Lusotitan, Camptosaurus and Draconyx, and Apatosaurus and Dinheirosaurus. Other vertebrates that are known to have shared this paleo-environment include ray-finned fishes, frogs, salamanders, turtles, sphenodonts, lizards, terrestrial and aquatic crocodylomorphs, and several species of pterosaur. Shells of bivalves and aquatic snails are also common. The flora of the period has been evidenced in fossils of green algae, fungi, mosses, horsetails, cycads, ginkgoes, and several families of conifers. Vegetation varied from river-lining forests of tree ferns with fern understory (gallery forests), to fern savannas with occasional trees such as the Araucaria-like conifer Brachyphyllum.
