= Michael A. Mares =

American zoologist, academic, and author

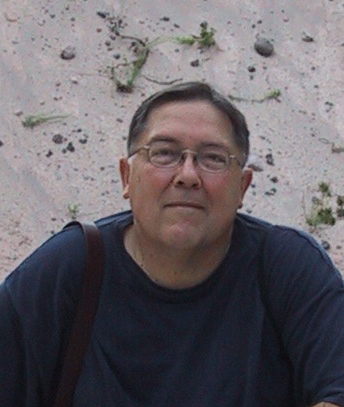
- Occupations: Zoologist, academic, and author
- Awards: National Medal for Museums and Libraries, Institute of Museum and Library Service

Academic background
- Education: B.S., Biology; M.S., Biology; Ph.D., Zoology
- Alma mater: University of New Mexico; Fort Hays Kansas State University; University of Texas

Academic work
- Institutions: University of Oklahoma; Sam Noble Oklahoma Museum of Natural History

Michael A. Mares is an American zoologist, academic, and author. He is the Emeritus Director and Curator at the Sam Noble Museum, as well as a Professor Emeritus in the Department of Biology at the University of Oklahoma.

Mares is the recipient of the 2008 Jackson Award for exceptional service to the American Society of Mammalogists and is most known for his works on convergent evolution, conservation, biogeography, systematics, and ecology of small mammals. He is the co-editor of Latin American Mammalogy: History, Biodiversity, and Conservation and the author of A Desert Calling: Life in a Forbidding Landscape.

== Education ==
Mares completed his Bachelor of Science in Biology from the University of New Mexico. Later, he obtained a Master of Science in Biology from Fort Hays Kansas State University and a Ph.D. in Zoology from the University of Texas.

== Career ==
In 1972, Mares joined the Universidad Nacional de Tucumán as an adjunct professor of Zoology and later became a visiting professor of Ecology in 1974. From 1973 to 1981, he was an Assistant/Associate Professor of Biological Sciences at the University of Pittsburgh. In 1981, he joined the University of Oklahoma, where he held multiple appointments including serving as Professor of Zoology and Curator of Mammals at the Stovall Museum from 1983 to 2018. Over the years, he has held appointments as Joseph Brandt Professor from 1983 to 2003, Affiliate Faculty Member at the School of International and Area Studies from 2000 to 2018 and Presidential Professor from 2008 to 2018. In addition, he has been a Research Associate at the Museum of Texas Tech University since 2001 and the Museum of Southwestern Biology since 2011. Since 2018, he has been a Curator and Director Emeritus at the Sam Noble Museum and holds the title of Professor Emeritus in the Department of Biology.

Mares was the President of the American Society of Mammalogists from 2010 to 2012, and the President of the Natural Science Collections Alliance from 2007 to 2009. Since 1983–2003 and 2008–2018, he served as the Director of Sam Noble Oklahoma Museum of Natural History; he was a Fulbright Scholar to Argentina in 1986 and served on the Fulbright Board of Directors in the 1980s–1990s.

== Research ==
Mares' zoology research has won him the 1989 Don W. Tinkle Research Excellence Award from the Southwestern Association of Naturalists. He also won the 2000 C. Hart Merriam Award from the American Society of Mammalogists. He has authored more than 200 publications spanning the areas of species diversity, invasive species, and wildlife ecology including books and articles in peer-reviewed journals.

=== Ecology ===
Mares' evolutionary ecology research has focused on the understanding of ecosystems, species interactions, and ecological processes, especially convergent evolution of ecology, physiology, anatomy, and behavior of mammal faunas in deserts. His research on the mammals of Salta Province yielded data and insights into their distribution and ecology, influencing the formulation of efficient conservation strategies for the region's mammal fauna. In his investigation concerning the interplay among home range dimensions, food accessibility, and population density in eastern chipmunks, it was revealed that food availability significantly influences average home range size, whereas population density does not show any discernible impact on movement behaviors. His analysis of breeding bird censuses on islands in Pymatuning Lake provided evidence that the distribution of bird species across these islands follows a random pattern, resulting in distinct species-area relationships differing from conventional biogeographic analyses. In collaboration with KA Ernest and others, he investigated small mammal community structure and composition in diverse habitats of Central Brazil, yielding insights into various life-history characteristics. Furthermore, his research on Argentine mammals' ecology, distribution, and status analyzed demographic, historical, and socioeconomic factors influencing their populations, and provided a species list with occurrence details.

=== Conservation ===
Mares' conservation research has explored the behavior of animal species in their natural habitats. Focusing his research efforts on conservation of South American mammals with Argentina as a paradigm, his work offered insights into the legal exportation of wildlife from Argentina and provided solutions related to conservation in South America. Furthermore, his book Latin American Mammalogy: History, Biodiversity, and Conservation addressed the preservation strategy and management concerning the significant transformations occurring in the natural landscapes of Latin America. Moreover, he examined the contributions made by collections and museums to conservation biology and underscored the significance of integrating these institutions and their associated research efforts to develop a comprehensive program for conservation education.

=== Evolution ===
Mares' research on convergent evolution has studied the interactions between evolutionary processes and ecological dynamics. While examining the reproductive behavior of ratites and tinamous, his study revealed a broad spectrum of mating systems, varying from monogamy to mixed polygyny/polyandry, underscoring their significant role in elucidating the adaptive implications of social structure, mating systems, and parental care strategies. His investigation into the role of granitic outcrops as a selective force in mammalian evolution established the crucial role of granite outcrops around the globe in enhancing biodiversity in areas that are typically depauperate due to their semiarid or arid nature. He has conducted field research in the United States, Mexico, Costa Rica, Venezuela, Colombia, Brazil, Argentina, Egypt, Iran, and India. Concentrating his research efforts on the unique adaptations and ecological characteristics of Tympanoctomys barrerae, his study shed light on its poorly known natural history and provided evidence for its convergence with other desert-dwelling rodents with similar dietary and physiological traits. His more recent work in 2017 focused on genetic diversity and taxonomy in the tribe Lasiurini, shedding light on the timing of hoary bat colonization in the Hawaiian Islands, and providing evidence for recognizing North American and Hawaiian hoary bats as distinct species.

== Awards and honors ==
- 1989 – Don W. Tinkle Research Excellence Award, Southwestern Association of Naturalists
- 2002 – Elected AAAS Fellow by the American Association for the Advancement of Science
- 2008 – Jackson Award, American Society of Mammalogists
- 2008 – Joseph Brandt Professorship, University of Oklahoma
- 2014 – National Medal for Museums and Libraries, IMLS

== Bibliography ==
=== Books ===
- Mammalian Biology in South America (1980) ISBN 0931796067
- Guide to the Mammals of Salta Province, Argentina (1989) ISBN 9780806152028
- The Mammals of Oklahoma (1989) ISBN 978-0806122175
- The Mammals of Tucumán (1991) ISBN 9781883090036
- Latin American Mammalogy: History, Biodiversity and Conservation (1991) ISBN 9780806123431
- Guide to the Bats of Argentina (1993) ISBN 9781883090005
- Encyclopedia of Deserts (1999) ISBN 9780806131467
- The Bats of Argentina (1999) ISBN 0964018896
- A Desert Calling: Life in a Forbidding Landscape (2002) ISBN 9780674007475

=== Selected articles ===
- Coleman, B. D., Mares, M. A., Willig, M. R., & Hsieh, Y. H. (1982). Randomness, area, and species richness. Ecology, 63(4), 1121–1133.
- Mares, M. A., & Ojeda, R. A. (1982). Patterns of diversity and adaptation in South American hystricognath rodents. Mammalian Biology in South America, 6, 393–432.
- Mares, M. A., Willig, M. R., & Lacher Jr, T. E. (1985). The Brazilian Caatinga in South American zoogeography: tropical mammals in a dry region. Journal of Biogeography, 57–69.
- Mares, M. A. (1992). Neotropical mammals and the myth of Amazonian biodiversity. Science, 255(5047), 976–979.
- Baird, A. B., Braun, J. K., Mares, M. A., Morales, J. C., Patton, J. C., Tran, C. Q., & Bickham, J. W. (2015). Molecular systematic revision of tree bats (Lasiurini): doubling the native mammals of the Hawaiian Islands. Journal of Mammalogy, 96(6), 1255–1274.
