= Reform of the date of Easter =

Proposals to change the festival date

Various reforms of the date of Easter have been proposed. These proposals include setting a fixed date or agreeing between Eastern and Western Christendom a common basis for calculating the date of Easter so that all Christians celebrate Easter on the same day. Attempts include a 1923 Pan-Orthodox congress proposing calendar changes (without full agreement), a 1997 World Council of Churches plan using astronomical calculations, and renewed 2008–2009 discussions about fixing a common Sunday. As of 2026, no such agreement has been reached.

Reform may also refer to historic reforms of the Computus, such as the adoption of the epact tables by Dionysius Exiguus in the 6th century and by Bede in the 8th century.

== Description ==
A reform of the date of Easter has been proposed several times because the current system for determining the date of Easter is seen as presenting two significant problems:

1. Its date varies from year to year. It can fall on up to 35 days in March and April of the respective calendar. While many Christians do not consider this to be a problem, it can cause frequent difficulties of co-ordination with civil calendars, for example academic terms. Many countries have public holidays around Easter weekend or tied to the date of Easter but spread from February to June, such as Shrove Tuesday or Ascension and Pentecost.
2. Some Eastern churches (6 in total) calculate the date of Easter using the Julian calendar, whereas most Eastern churches use the Revised Julian calendar and all Western churches and civil authorities have adopted the Gregorian reforms for all calendrical purposes. Also a very few Eastern churches have adopted the Gregorian method of calculation. Hence in most years, Easter is celebrated on a later date in the East than in the West.

There have been controversies about the "correct" date of Easter since antiquity, but most Christian churches today agree on certain points. According to the Council of Nicaea in 325, Easter should be celebrated:

- on a Sunday,
- after the nominal Northward equinox – that is the start of spring in the Northern and of autumn in the Southern Hemisphere, fixed on 21 March in the Gregorian calendar –,
- after the first ecclesiastical full moon of the astronomical season.

There is less agreement whether Easter also should occur:

- so that Annunciation – celebrated 25 March, 9 months before Christmas – does not fall on any day from the Sunday before Easter to the Sunday after,
- on or after the 14th day of the lunar month of Nisan,
- not before Jewish Pesach – Easter is after Christian Passover by definition.

The disagreements have been particularly about the determination of moon phases and the equinox, some preferring astronomical observation from a certain location (usually Jerusalem, Alexandria, Rome or local), most others following nominal approximations of these in either the Hebrew, Julian or Gregorian calendar using different lookup tables and cycles in their algorithms. Deviations may also result from different customs for the start of the day, i.e. dusk, sunset, midnight, dawn or sunrise. Furthermore, it may be accepted to have the respective starts of the astronomical season, the full moon and the Sunday occur on the same date as long as they are observed in that order.

== Fixed date ==
It has been proposed that the first problem could be resolved by making Easter occur on a date fixed relative to the western Gregorian calendar every year, or alternatively on a Sunday within a fixed range of seven or eight dates. While tying Easter to one fixed date would serve to underline the belief that it commemorates an actual historical event, without an accompanying calendar reform that changes the pattern of the days of the week (itself a subject of religious controversy) or adopts a leap week, it would also break the tradition of Easter always being on a Sunday, established since the 2nd century and by now deeply embedded in the liturgical practice and theological understanding of almost all Christian denominations.

The Second Vatican Council agreed in 1963 to accept a fixed Sunday in the Gregorian calendar as the date for Easter as long as other Christian churches agreed on it as well. They also agreed in principle to adopt a civil calendar reform as long as there were never any days outside the cycle of seven days per week. In 1977, some Eastern Orthodox representatives objected to separating the date of Easter from lunar phases.

The Montanists, a 5th-century sect, celebrated Easter on the Sunday following April 6 (in the Julian calendar). This is equivalent to the Sunday closest to April 9. The April 6 date was apparently chosen because it was equivalent to the 14th day of Artemisios in an earlier local calendar, hence, the 14th of the first month of spring.

The two most widespread proposals for fixing the date of Easter would set it on either the second Sunday in April (8 to 14, week 14 or 15), or the Sunday after the second Saturday in April (9 to 15). They only differ in years with dominical letter G or AG where 1 April is a Sunday. In both schemes, account has been taken of the fact that—in spite of the many difficulties in establishing the dates of the historical events involved—many scholars attribute a high degree of probability to Friday 7 April 30, as the date of the crucifixion of Jesus, which would make 9 April the date of the Resurrection. Another date which is supported by many scholars is 3 April 33, making 5 April the date of the Resurrection.

In the late 1920s and 1930s, this idea gained some momentum along with other calendar reform proposals, such as the International Fixed Calendar (IFC) and the World Calendar. In 1928, a law was passed in the United Kingdom authorising an Order in Council which would fix the nationwide date of Easter on the Sunday after the second Saturday in April. However, this was never implemented, but remains popular at least within the Church of England. In a 2001 article for the WCC, Dagmar Heller, who was the only woman to participate in the 1997 Aleppo Conference, states that Western churches previously preferred a "third option", i.e. a fixed Sunday in April, but tried to accommodate Eastern churches by giving this up.

The Sunday of an ordinal ISO week n is also the nth Sunday of the year, except in A/AG, B/BA and C/CB years where it is the n+1st Sunday. Therefore, both major proposals put Easter on the 15th Sunday of the year. The exception to this is either in common years starting on Monday (G), where 8 April, i.e. the second Sunday in April, is the 14th Sunday of the year, or in leap years starting on Sunday (AG), where 15 April, i.e. the Sunday after the second Saturday in April, is the 16th Sunday of the year. That means, the Saturday-based rule approximates the 15th Sunday better.

The Sunday after the first Wednesday in April would always be in ISO week W14, except for leap years starting on Thursday (DC) where the week count is one higher than in otherwise equivalent common years after February. The Symmetry454 Calendar proposes a fixed date of Easter in week 14, which would agree with the aforementioned proposals in most years, but would be 1 week earlier in F/GF years (like the only deviation of the Montanist definition) and also in DC, D/ED and E/FE years.

The first possible Gregorian date for Easter, 22 March, is also one of the dates with (almost) fixed ISO week number, i.e. W12, which is usually also the week of the equinox a day or two earlier. If the 52 weeks of a usual year are grouped into 13 nominal lunation phases of 4 weeks each (similar to IFC), then the equinox week concludes the third of these months and the next nominal full moon in the middle of the month would occur on Sunday of W14, making it the fixed date for Passover. Easter Sunday would follow seven days later, in W15, which is between 11 and 18 April.

Since Candlemas, which traditionally concludes Christmastide, is always on 2 February, it is almost always in W05 (with the exception of W06 if on a Monday), a W15 Easter would ensure the three pre-Lenten Sundays, i.e. Septuagesima, Sexagesima and Quinquagesima, existed in all years, and not more than these.

Weeks for currently possible dates of Easter Sunday; proposed and special dates highlighted
Sunday of the year	Dominical letter														ISO week	Month
Sunday of the year	AG	A	BA	B	CB	C	DC	D	ED	E	FE	F	GF	G	ISO week	Month
12th	—N/a							22		23		24		25	W12	March
13th	25	26		27		28									W12	March
13th							28	29		30		31		01	W13	March
14th	01	02		03		04									W13	April
14th							04	05		06		07		08	W14	April
15th	08	09		10		11									W14	April
15th							11	12		13		14		15	W15	April
16th	15	16		17		18									W15	April
16th							18	19		20		21		22	W16	April
17th	22	23		24		25									W16	April
17th	—N/a						25	—N/a							W17	April

major proposals around 15th Sunday
deviations of the 2 major proposals
week-based proposals
clashes with other holidays, to be avoided

== Unified date ==
Proposals to resolve the second problem have made greater progress, but they are yet to be adopted.

Table of (Gregorian) dates of Easter 2001–2025
Year	Full Moon	Jewish Passover (Note: Jewish Passover is on Nisan 15 of its calendar. It commences at sunset preceding the date indicated (as does Easter by some traditions).)	Astronomical Easter (Note: Astronomical Easter is the first Sunday after the astronomical full moon after the astronomical March equinox as measured at the meridian of Jerusalem according to the WCC proposal.)	Gregorian Easter	Julian Easter
2001	8 April		15 April		
2002	28 March		31 March		5 May
2003	16 April	17 April	20 April		27 April
2004	5 April	6 April	11 April		
2005	25 March	24 April	27 March		1 May
2006	13 April		16 April		23 April
2007	2 April	3 April	8 April		
2008	21 March	20 April	23 March		27 April
2009	9 April		12 April		19 April
2010	30 March		4 April		
2011	18 April	19 April	24 April		
2012	6 April	7 April	8 April		15 April
2013	27 March	26 March	31 March		5 May
2014	15 April		20 April		
2015	4 April		5 April		12 April
2016	23 March	23 April	27 March		1 May
2017	11 April		16 April		
2018	31 March		1 April		8 April
2019	20 March	20 April	24 March	21 April	28 April
2020	8 April	9 April	12 April		19 April
2021	28 March		4 April		2 May
2022	16 April		17 April		24 April
2023	6 April		9 April		16 April
2024	25 March	23 April	31 March		5 May
2025	13 April		20 April		

=== 1923 proposal ===
An astronomical rule for Easter was proposed by the 1923 Pan-Orthodox Congress of Constantinople that also proposed the Revised Julian calendar: Easter was to be the Sunday after the midnight-to-midnight day at the meridian of the Church of the Holy Sepulchre in Jerusalem (35° 13′ 47.2″ E or UT + 2^{h} 20^{m} 55^{s} for the small dome over the Greek quire) during which the first full moon after the vernal equinox occurs.

Although the instant of the full moon must occur after the instant of the vernal equinox, it may occur on the same day. If the full moon occurs on a Sunday, Easter is the following Sunday. This proposed astronomical rule was rejected by all Orthodox churches, and was never considered by any Western church.

=== 1997 proposal ===
The World Council of Churches (WCC) proposed a reform of the method of determining the date of Easter at a summit in Aleppo, Syria, in 1997: Easter would be defined as the first Sunday following the first astronomical full moon following the astronomical vernal equinox, as determined from the meridian of Jerusalem. The reform would have been implemented starting in 2001, since in that year the Eastern and Western dates of Easter would coincide.

This reform has not been implemented. It would have relied mainly on the co-operation of the Eastern Orthodox Church, since the date of Easter would change for them immediately; whereas for the Western churches, the new system would not differ from that currently in use until 2019. However, Eastern Orthodox support was not forthcoming, and the reform failed. The much greater impact that this reform would have had on the Eastern churches in comparison with those of the West led some Orthodox to suspect that the WCC's decision was an attempt by the West to impose its viewpoint unilaterally on the rest of the world under the guise of ecumenism. However, it could also be argued that it is fair to ask a significant change of Eastern Christians, as they would be simply making the same substantial changes the various Western Churches have already made in 1582 (when the Catholic Church first adopted the Gregorian calendar) and subsequent years so as to bring the calendar and Easter more in line with the seasons.

=== 2008–2009 proposals ===
In 2008 and 2009, there was a new attempt to reach a consensus on a unified date on the part of Catholic, Orthodox and Protestant leaders. This effort largely relies on earlier work carried out during the 1997 Aleppo conference. It was organized by academics working at the Institute of Ecumenical Studies of Lviv University.

Part of this attempt was reportedly influenced by ecumenical efforts in Syria and Lebanon, where the Greek-Melkite Church has played an important role in improving ties with the Orthodox. There is also a series of apparition phenomena known as Our Lady of Soufanieh that has urged for a common date of Easter.

=== 2014–present proposals ===
In May 2015, on the anniversary of the meeting between him and Pope Francis, Coptic Pope Tawadros II wrote a letter to Pope Francis asking for him to consider renewing effort at a unified date for Easter.

In response, on 12 June 2015, Catholic Pope Francis remarked to the International Catholic Charismatic Renewal Services 3rd World Retreat of Priests at the Basilica of Saint John Lateran in Rome that "we have to come to an agreement" for a common date on Easter. Lucetta Scaraffia, a historian, writing in the Vatican daily newspaper L'Osservatore Romano, said the Pope offered this initiative to change the date of Easter "as a gift of unity with the other Christian churches" adding that a common date for Easter would encourage "reconciliation between the Christian churches and ... a sort of making sense out of the calendar". A week later Aphrem II, the Syriac Orthodox Patriarch of Antioch, met with Pope Francis and noted that the celebration of Easter "on two different dates is a source of great discomfort and weakens the common witness of the church in the world".

In January 2016, the Archbishop of Canterbury, Justin Welby, announced that he on behalf of the Anglican Communion had joined discussions with Catholic, Coptic, and Orthodox representatives over a fixed date for Easter, and that he hoped it would happen within the next 5–10 years. Welby suggested that Easter be fixed on either the second or third Sunday of April, relative to the Gregorian calendar. This proposal remains to be approved, especially by Eastern churches, which currently determine Easter using the Julian calendar.

Statements in 2021 and 2025 by the Vatican and Orthodox churches stated the goal to achieve consensus by 2025, just in time for the 1700th anniversary of the Council of Nicaea, but without publishing any specific plans or who would adopt which changes. The Faith and Order Commission of the World Council of Churches arranged conferences to mark the event.

On November 10, 2022, Ecumenical Patriarch Bartholomew of Constantinople stated that both the Orthodox and Catholic sides have a good intention to finally establish a common date for the celebration of Easter before the celebration of the 1700th anniversary of the First Council of Nicaea, which took place in 325; however, it was too early to talk about details. In 2024 he again called on "Western and Eastern Christians to celebrate Easter on the same date, starting from 2025".

According to international standards, Easter Sunday ends the week containing Good Friday and the week of the second Sunday in April has the ordinal number 14 or 15 (dominical letters D/DC, E/ED, F/FE and GF, i.e. 46.25% of years), hence the third Sunday is one respective week later. There currently is no public proposal under discussion that used a fixed week of the year for Easter and dependent feasts. The second Sunday in April is usually the 15th Sunday of the year (except for dominical letter G, 10.75%), which is almost always also the Sunday after the second Saturday in April (except for dominical letter AG, 3.75%).

Table of (Gregorian) dates of Easter 2026–2040
Year	Full Moon	Jewish Passover	Astronomical Easter	Gregorian Easter	Julian Easter	W14-7	2nd April Sunday	15th Sunday	2nd April weekend	W15-7
2026	3 April	2 April	5 April		12 April	5 April	12 April			
2027	22 March	22 April	28 March		2 May	11 April				18 April
2028	9 April	11 April	16 April			9 April				16 April
2029	29 March	31 March	1 April		8 April	8 April		15 April		
2030	17 April	18 April	21 April		28 April	7 April	14 April			
2031	7 April	8 April	13 April			6 April	13 April			
2032	27 March		28 March		2 May	4 April	11 April			
2033	14 April		17 April		24 April	10 April				17 April
2034	3 April	4 April	9 April			9 April				16 April
2035	24 March	24 April	25 March		29 April	8 April		15 April		
2036	10 April	12 April	13 April		20 April	6 April	13 April			
2037	31 March		5 April			5 April	12 April			
2038	21 March	20 April	28 March	25 April	25 April	11 April				18 April
2039	9 April		10 April		17 April	10 April				17 April
2040	28 March	29 March	1 April		6 May	8 April			15 April	

== See also ==
- Computus
- Easter controversy
