= Coptic philosophy =

There are no original works of philosophy in the Coptic language. All surviving philosophical passages in Coptic are of Greek origin and many are anonymous. Mostly they deal with ethics and are treated like wisdom literature. Only a few texts have been edited and published.

== Philosophical excerpts ==
Among the named philosophers quoted in Coptic are Diogenes, Plato, Dios and the probably legendary Anacharsis. A translation of an excerpt from Plato's Republic (588A–589B) has been found in the Nag Hammadi library, but it is a poor translation, extensively reworked to better conform with Gnostic teaching. Many leaves of a Coptic manuscript consisting of philosophical texts, fables with Christian interpretations and explicitly Christian texts survive dispersed between libraries in Vienna and London. The parchment manuscript was copied in the 10th or 11th century in the White Monastery. The section of philosophy is titled "Notes of Some Philosophers". Anthony Alcock supposes that it was compiled in Akhmim, a centre of Greek learning into the 6th century and also a late redoubt of Egyptian paganism. One of the anonymous sayings from the Vienna fragments that cannot be identified with any Greek text is this:

It is better to do good to a dog and a lion than to feed a thankless person. When the dog and the lion become tame, they remain friends of those who feed them. The disorderly person not only does not remain a friend but you will find that when you are doing him a favour, he is trying to rob your house and deliver you into the hands of your enemies.

Six anonymous sayings found in the Vienna fragments K 944, 945 and 946 are also found in the Homily on the Passion and Resurrection of Pseudo-Evodius, where they are called "wisdom that is outside" (i.e., of the Bible).

Although many writings of the Church Fathers contain extensive philosophizing, few of these are known to have been translated into Coptic. The most notable is Gregory of Nyssa's De anima et resurrectione, a piece of philosophical theology that includes references to Plato's Phaedrus. The native Coptic saint Shenoute also references Plato in his writings.

== Coptic attitudes to philosophy ==
Conflicting Coptic attitudes to Greek philosophy are apparent in several sources. Some philosophy, or at least Plato, seems to have been a standard part of a Coptic education in the first centuries AD. Socrates of Constantinople records that when the Greek monk Evagrius Ponticus went to the Coptic monastic complex of Kellia in Egypt, he spent fourteen years as a calligrapher learning the Coptic language. He became a disciple of Macarius of Egypt and Macarius of Alexandria, "acquiring from them the philosophy of deeds whereas before he only knew the philosophy of words". In this passage, Socrates uses "philosophy" in its original sense (love of wisdom), even citing the definition of philosophy in Plato's Phaedo, i.e., the "practice of dying". The Coptic letters of Anthony the Great (died 356) treat the quest of philosophy and Christianity as the same (wisdom), but the hagiographic Life of Anthony portrays its subject as an implacable foe of the philosophers.

== Later works by Copts ==
Some later Copts wrote philosophy or philosophical theology in Arabic. The Kitāb al-Burhān, written by Ibn al-Rāhib in 1270–71, combines theology, ethics and philosophy. It contains a theodicy based on that of the Islamic theologian Fakhr al-Dīn al-Rāzī.

In modern times, and especially with the strong French and British influence during the colonial period, there was a resurgence of Coptic philosophical writing. Two notable examples of modern Coptic philosophers are Bishop Gregorius (general bishop of higher studies) and Zakariyya Ibrahim.

== See also ==
- Ancient Egyptian philosophy
- Coptic literature

== Bibliography ==
- Alcock, Anthony (n.d.). "Greek Philosophy in Coptic" – via Academia.edu.
- Bull, Christian H. (2023). "Plato in Upper Egypt: Greek Philosophy and Monastic Origenism in the Coptic Excerpt from Plato's Republic (NHC VI, 5)". In Hugo Lundhaug; Christian H. Bull (eds.). The Nag Hammadi Codices as Monastic Books. Mohr Siebeck.
- Burns, Dylan M. (2023). "More Greek Philosophers Among the Copts: The Notes of Some Philosophers (MONB.BE) and the 'Wisdom from Outside' in Pseudo-Evodius of Rome's Homily on the Passion and Resurrection". In Ivan Miroshnikov (ed.). Parabiblica Coptica. Mohr Siebeck. pp. 31–52. doi:10.1628/978-3-16-162224-3. hdl:11245.1/49e6966b-4f7e-4bec-b080-5876c7882a82. ISBN 978-3-16-162224-3.
- Corrigan, Kevin (2009). Evagrius and Gregory: Mind, Soul and Body in the 4th Century. Ashgate.
- Kuhn, K. H. (1991). "Philosophy". In Aziz Suryal Atiya (ed.). The Coptic Encyclopedia. Vol. 6. New York: Macmillan Publishers. pp. 1958a – 1958b.
- Rubenson, Samuel (1995). The Letters of St. Antony: Monasticism and the Making of a Saint. Fortress Press.
- Sidarus, Adel Y. (2004). "Ibn al-Rāhib". In Bearman, P. J.; Bianquis, Th.; Bosworth, C. E.; van Donzel, E. & Heinrichs, W. P. (eds.). The Encyclopaedia of Islam, Second Edition. Volume XII: Supplement. Leiden: E. J. Brill. ISBN 978-90-04-13974-9.
- Till, Walter [in German] (1934). "Griechische Philosophen bei den Kopten" (PDF). Mélanges Maspero II. Mémoires publiés par les Membres de l'Institut français d’archéologie orientale du Caire. Vol. 67. Institut français d'archéologie orientale du Caire. pp. 165–175.
- Ward, William A. (1957). "The Philosophy of Death in Coptic Epitaphs". Journal of Bible and Religion. 25 (1): 34–40.
