= Dormition of the Mother of God =

Great Feast in various Christian churches

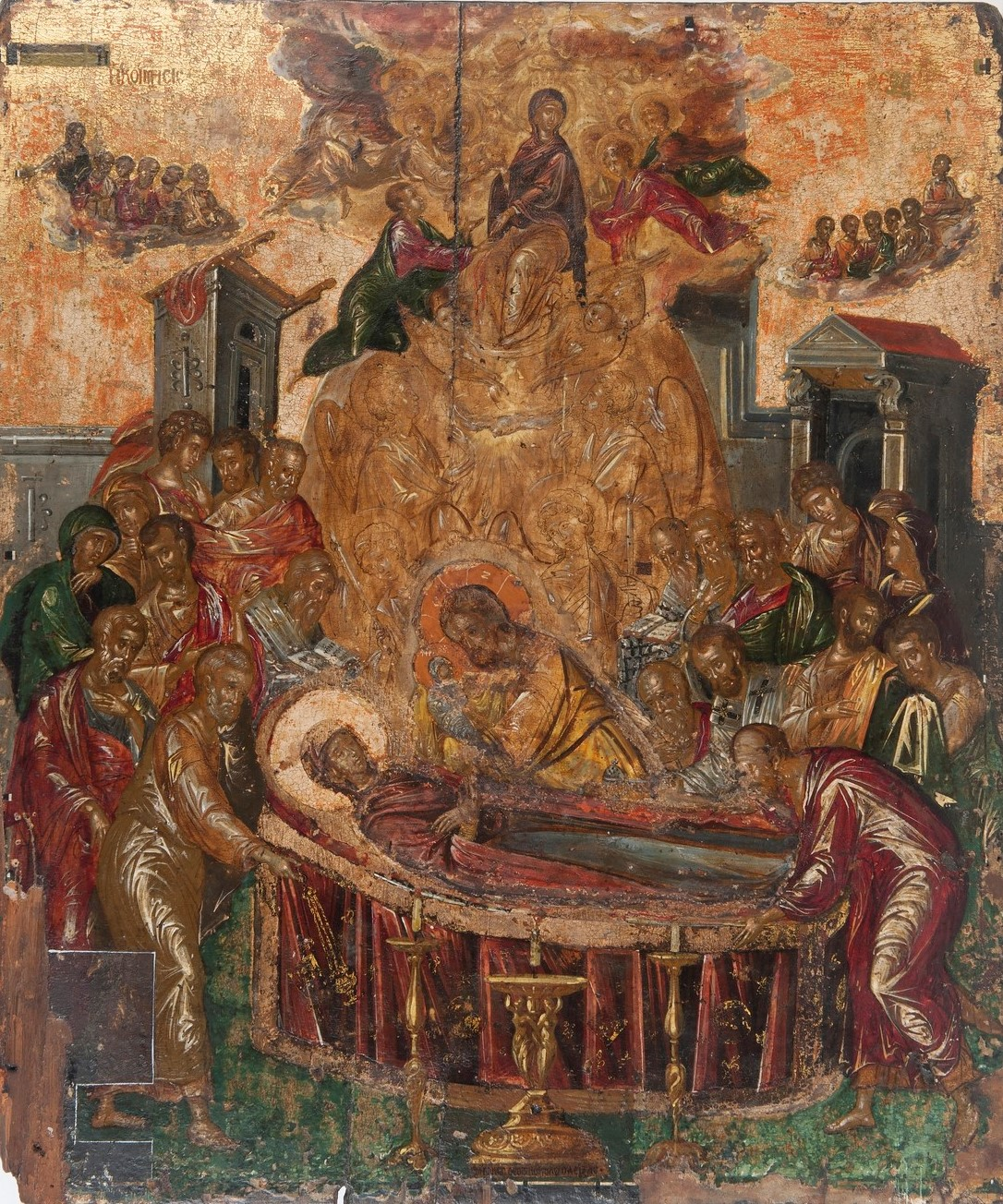
- Icon of the Dormition by El Greco, 16th century (Cathedral of the Dormition, Ermoupolis)
- Observed by: Eastern Christianity
- Date: August 28 [O.S. August 15]: (some Eastern Orthodox churches); August 15: (Syriac Orthodox, some Eastern and Western churches); January 29 (Coptic Orthodox and Orthodox Tewahedo Churches); Sunday nearest August 15: Armenian Apostolic Church
- Duration: 9 days Byzantine Rite
- Frequency: annual
- First time: Unknown

The Dormition of the Mother of God is a Great Feast of the Eastern Orthodox, Oriental Orthodox, and Eastern Catholic Churches (except the East Syriac churches). It celebrates the "falling asleep" (death) of Mary the Theotokos ("Mother of God", literally translated as God-bearer), and her being taken up into heaven. The Feast of the Dormition is observed on August 15, which for the churches using the Julian calendar corresponds to August 28 on the Gregorian calendar. The Armenian Apostolic Church celebrates the Dormition not on a fixed date, but on the Sunday nearest 15 August. In Western Churches the corresponding feast is known as the Assumption of Mary, with the exception of the Scottish Episcopal Church, which has traditionally celebrated the Falling Asleep of the Blessed Virgin Mary on August 15.

Christian canonical scriptures do not record the death or Dormition of Mary. Hippolytus of Thebes, a 7th- or 8th-century author, writes in his partially preserved chronology of the New Testament that Mary lived for 11 years after the death of Jesus, dying in AD 41.

The use of the term dormition expresses the belief that the Virgin died without suffering, in a state of spiritual peace. This belief does not rest on any scriptural basis, but is affirmed by Orthodox sacred tradition. Some apocryphal writings testify to this opinion, though neither the Orthodox Church nor other Christians accord them scriptural authority. The Orthodox understanding of the Dormition is compatible with Roman Catholic teaching, and was the dominant belief within the Western Church until late in the Middle Ages, when the slightly different belief in the bodily Assumption of Mary into heaven began to gain ground. Pope Pius XII declared the latter a dogma of the Catholic Church in 1950.

== Dormition fast ==
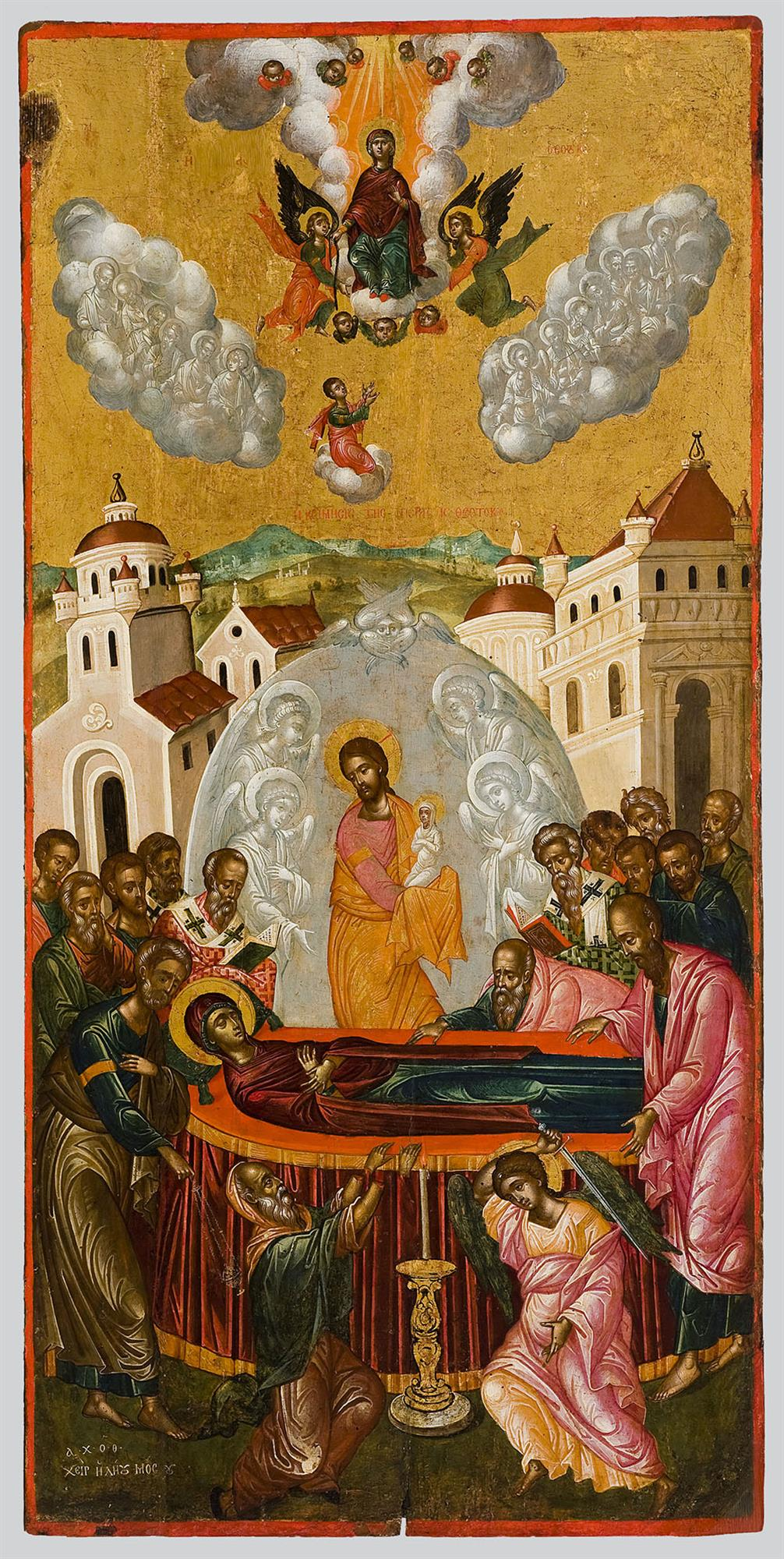
The Dormition and Assumption of the Virgin by Elias Moskos circa 1679

The Feast of the Dormition is preceded by a two-week fast, referred to as the Dormition Fast. From August 1 to August 14 (inclusive) Orthodox and Eastern Catholics fast from red meat, poultry, meat products, dairy products (eggs and milk products), fish, oil, and wine. In churches that follow the old or Julian Calendar, the fast is from August 14 to August 28. In the Coptic Orthodox Church, Ethiopian Orthodox Tewahedo Church and the Eritrean Orthodox Tewahedo Church, whose calendar is generally consistent with the Julian Calendar, the dates of the fast are from August 7 to August 22.

The Dormition Fast is a stricter fast than either the Nativity Fast (Advent) or the Apostles' Fast, with only wine and oil (but no fish) allowed on weekends. As with the other Fasts of the Church year, there is a Great Feast that falls during the Fast; in this case, the Transfiguration (August 6), on which fish, wine and oil are allowed.

In some places, the services on weekdays during the Dormition Fast are similar to the services during Great Lent (with some variations).

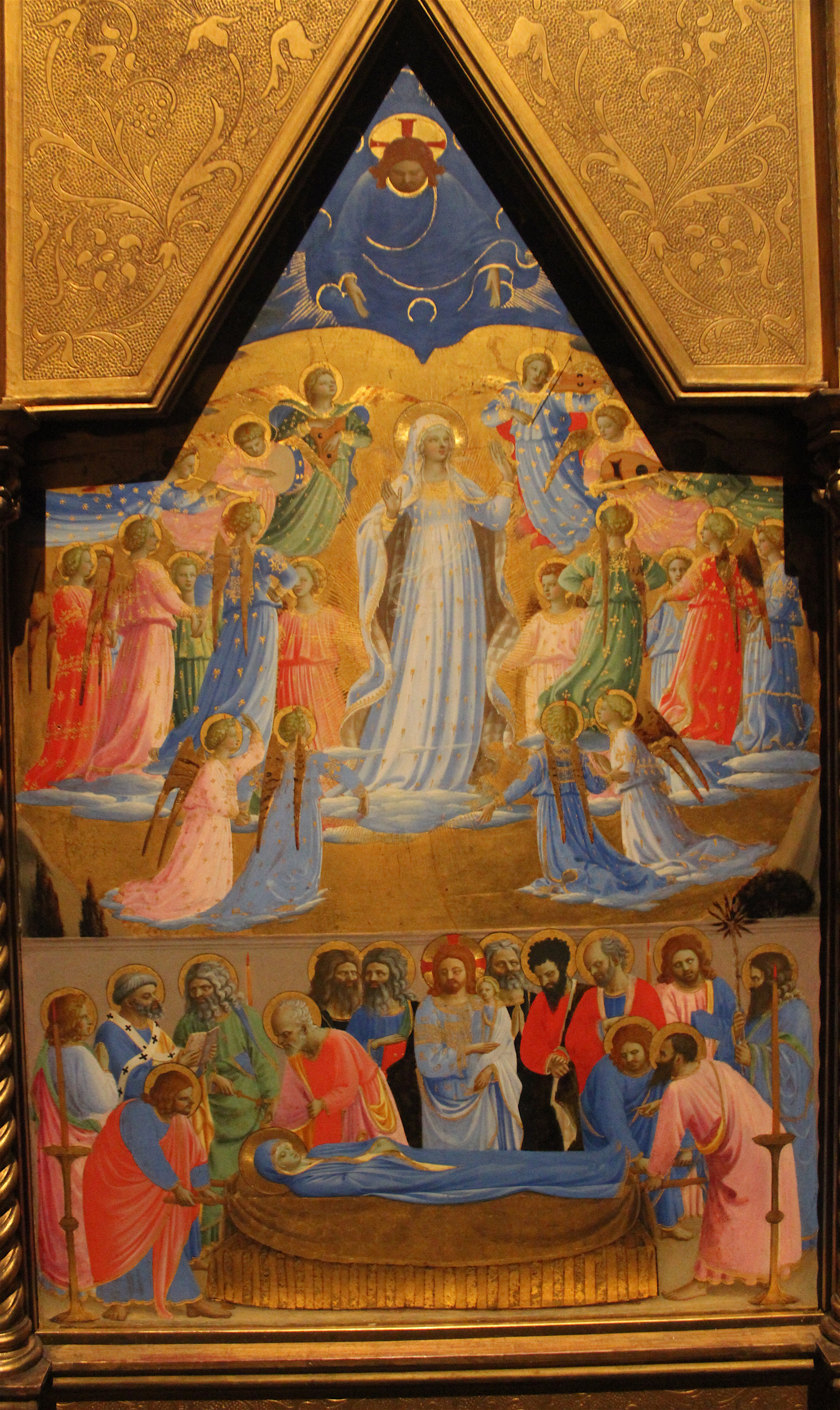
The Dormition and Assumption of the Virgin by Fra Angelico circa 1434

Many churches and monasteries in the Russian tradition perform the Lenten services on at least the first day of the Dormition Fast. In the Greek tradition, during the Fast either the Great Paraklesis (Supplicatory Canon) or the Small Paraklesis is celebrated every evening except Saturday evening and the Eves of the Transfiguration and the Dormition.

The first day of the Dormition Fast is a feast day called the Procession of the Cross (August 1), on which day it is customary to have an outdoor procession and perform the Lesser Blessing of Water. In Eastern Orthodoxy it is also the day of the Holy Seven Maccabees, Martyrs Abimus, Antonius, Gurias, Eleazar, Eusebonus, Alimus, and Marcellus, their mother Solomonia, and their teacher Eleazar. Therefore, the day is sometimes referred to as "Makovei". Finally it is also considered the First of the three "Feasts of the Saviour" in August, the Feast to the All-Merciful Saviour and the Most Holy Mother of God.

== Term ==
In Orthodoxy and Catholicism, in the language of the scripture, death is often called a sleeping or falling asleep (Greek κοίμησις; whence κοιμητήριον > coemetērium > cemetery, a place of sleeping; Latin: dormire, to sleep). A prominent example of this is the name of this feast; another is the Dormition of Saint Anna, Mother of the Virgin Mary.

== Origin and adoption of the tradition ==
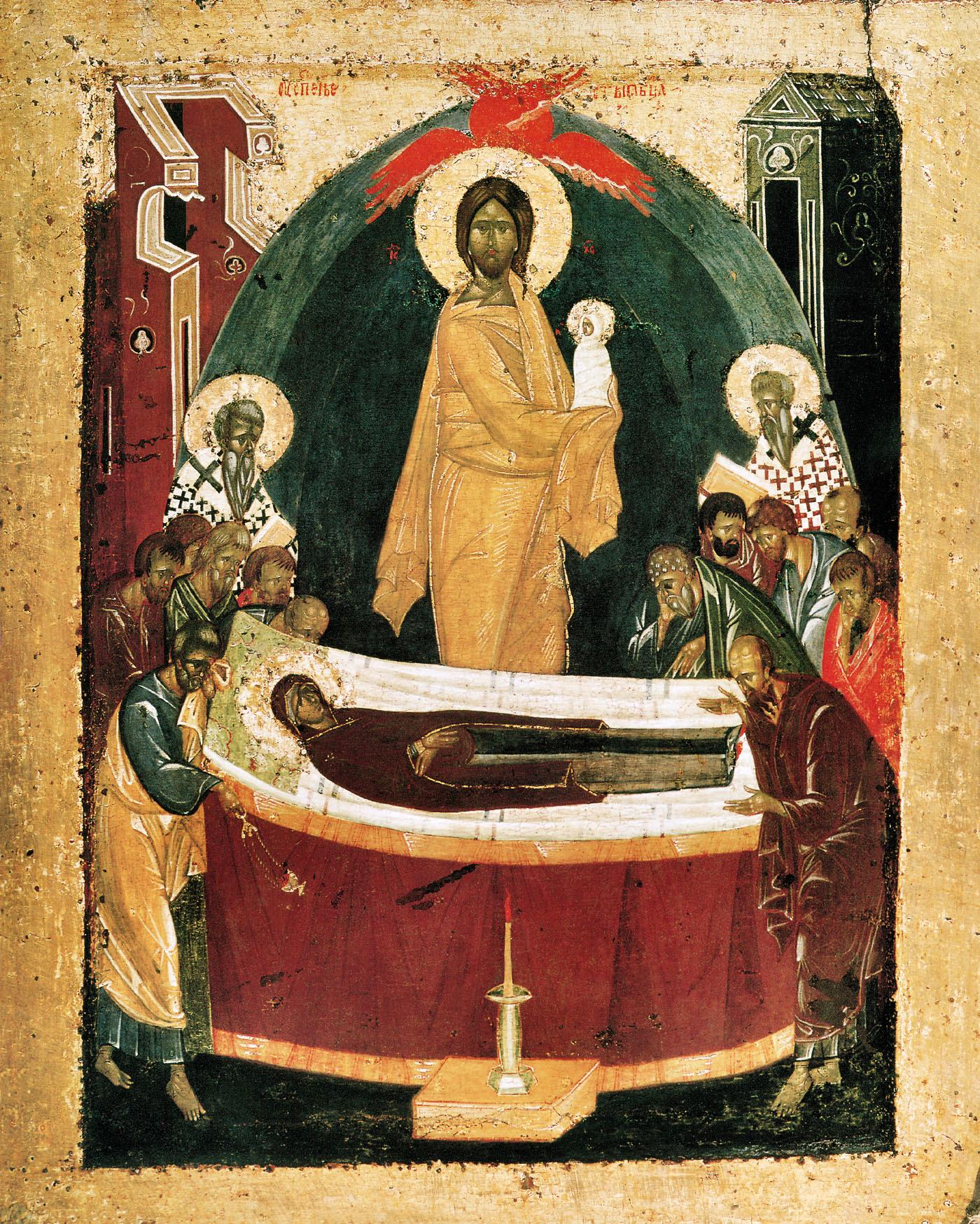
Icon of the Dormition by Theophan the Greek, 1392. The Theotokos is depicted lying on a bier, surrounded by the Twelve Apostles. At center, Jesus Christ is shown in a mandorla, swaddling the soul of the Virgin Mary (a red seraph is shown above his head). To either side of him are depicted the Hieromartyrs Dionysius the Areopagite and Ignatius the God-Bearer who, according to tradition, are responsible for transmitting the account of the dormition.

=== 1st–5th century ===
The first Christian century may be silent, but anonymous traditions concerning the Dormition began circulating as early as the third century and perhaps 'even earlier' such as the Book of Mary's Repose. According to some, before the 4th-5th century the Dormition was not celebrated among the Christians as a holy day.

Recent scholarship has shown that The Dormition/Assumption of Mary (attributed to John the Theologian or 'Pseudo-John'), another anonymous narrative, may even precede the Book of Mary's Repose. This Greek document, edited by Tischendorf and published in The Ante-Nicene Fathers, is dated by Tischendorf as no later than the 4th century. The Greek sources for the early period are only late copies and the first transmissions and earliest witnesses can be only found and accessed through the fragmentary translations into Christian Palestinian Aramaic and Syriac. Shoemaker identifies liturgical elements in "Pseudo-John", and the Six Books Apocryphon (dated to the early fourth century), which implies that the Dormition was a holy day in some circles by the 4th century. Additionally, the earliest known appearance of the Dormition in art is found on a sarcophagus in the crypt of a church in Zaragoza in Spain dated c. 330.

The written historical and archaeological record aside, a fairly representative example of mainstream Orthodox teaching is that Church Tradition preserved a more ubiquitous oral tradition. According to Sophia Fotopoulou, "We have no historical data to indicate how long the Mother of God remained on earth after the ascension of Christ into heaven, nor when, where, or how she died, for the Gospels say nothing of this. The foundation for the feast of the Dormition is to be found in a sacred tradition of the Church dating from apostolic times, apocryphal writings, the constant faith of the People of God, and the unanimous opinion of the holy Fathers and Doctors of the Church of the first thousand years of Christianity."

Epiphanius of Salamis (c. 310/20–403), a Jew by birth, born in Phoenicia, converted to Christianity in adulthood and lived as a monk for over 20 years in Palestine from 335–340 to 362, writes in "Panarion" in "Contra antidicomarianitas" about the end of the Virgin Mary the following:

If any think [I] am mistaken, moreover, let them search through the scriptures any neither find Mary's death, nor whether or not she died, nor whether or not she was buried—even though John surely travelled throughout Asia. And yet, nowhere does he say that he took the holy Virgin with him. Scripture simply kept silence because of the overwhelming wonder, not to throw men's minds into consternation. For I dare not say—though I have my suspicions, I keep silent. Perhaps, just as her death is not to be found, so I may have found some traces of the holy and blessed Virgin. ...The holy virgin may have died and been buried—her falling asleep was with honour, her death in purity, her crown in virginity. Or she may have been put to death—as the scripture says, 'And a sword shall pierce through her soul'—her fame is among the martyrs and her holy body, by which light rose on the world, [rests] amid blessings. Or she may have remained alive, for God is not incapable of doing whatever he wills. No one knows her end.

In the next chapter, Epiphanius compares Mary with three different people, who died in three different ways: Elijah, who was assumed into Heaven; John, who died a normal death; and Thecla, who was a martyr. This further shows that he was open to various options for her end, and did not know which of the options she actually experienced.

And if I should say anything more in her praise, [she is] like Elijah, who was virgin from his mother's womb, he always remained so perpetually, and was assumed and has not seen death. She is like John who leaned on the Lord's breast, "the disciple whom Jesus loved." She is like St. Thecla; and Mary is still more honored than she, because of the providence vouchsafed her.

Ambrose, however, who was a contemporary of Epiphanius, dismissed the view that Mary was martyred when exegeting Saint Simeon's prophecy in (Luke 2.35), seemingly critiquing those who took the prophecy literally, and reducing the number of options to either natural death or assumption:

Neither the letter of Scripture nor history teaches that Mary passed from this life by suffering execution, for it is not the soul but the body [some speculate] which is pierced through and through by the material sword.

=== Late 5th until 7th century ===
More Dormition traditions began surfacing in manuscripts during the late 5th century. Stephen Shoemaker characterised them as the "Palm of the Tree of Life" narratives, the "Bethlehem" narratives, and the "Coptic" narratives—aside from a handful of atypical narratives.

The events of the Dormition of the Virgin and her burial are dealt with in several known apocrypha such as the "Liber de transitu Virginis Mariae" by Pseudo-Melito of Sardis (5th century), a passing reference in Pseudo-Dionysius the Areopagite, and narratives by Pseudo-Cyril of Jerusalem, and Pseudo-Evodius. Around this time, the first Dormition narratives among mainstream authors appear, namely Jacob of Serug and Theodosius of Alexandria. These late—5th and 6th century Dormition narratives come from differing communions, so not all of their content was accepted, but only the basic idea that the Virgin Mary blissfully rested and her soul was received in heaven by her Son Jesus Christ at Dormition.

According to Nikephoros Kallistos Xanthopoulos in his "History of the Church," Emperor Maurice (582–602) issued an edict which set the date for the celebration of the Dormition on August 15. After this time more "mainstream" Dormition narratives began appearing, their content still in part based upon the earlier, mostly anonymous, narratives. Modestus, Patriarch of Jerusalem (630–632) said at this celebration, while preaching, that he regrets the lack of specific information about the death of the Virgin Mary. According to Truglia, "John of Thessalonica," another 7th-century author, "wrote a narrative admittedly based upon details found in earlier homilies." Theoteknos, bishop of Livias sometime between 550 and 650, also wrote a Dormition narrative similar in its content.

In Rome the feast called Dormitio Beatae Virginis was established by Pope Sergius I (687–701), borrowed from Constantinople.

== Narrative ==
According to later tradition, Mary, having spent her life after Pentecost supporting and serving the nascent Church, was living in the house of the Apostle John, in Jerusalem, when the Archangel Gabriel revealed to her that her death would occur three days later. The apostles, scattered throughout the world, are said to have been miraculously transported to be at her side when she died. The sole exception was Thomas, who was preaching in India. He is said to have arrived in a cloud above her tomb exactly three days after her death, and to have seen her body leaving to heaven. He asked her "Where are you going, O Holy One?", at which she took off her girdle and gave it to him saying "Receive this my friend", after which she disappeared.

Thomas was taken to his fellow apostles, whom he asked to see her grave, so that he could bid her goodbye. Mary had been buried in Gethsemane, according to her request. When they arrived at the grave, her body was gone, leaving a sweet fragrance. An apparition is said to have confirmed that Christ had taken her body to heaven after three days to be reunited with her soul. Eastern Orthodox theology teaches that the Theotokos has already undergone the bodily resurrection, which all will experience at the second coming, and stands in heaven in that glorified state which the other righteous ones will only enjoy after the Last Judgment.

== Related sites ==
The Dormition tradition is associated with various places, most notably with Jerusalem, which contains Mary's Tomb and the Basilica of the Dormition, and Ephesus, which contains the House of the Virgin Mary, and also with Constantinople where the Cincture of the Theotokos was enshrined from the 5th through 14th centuries.

== Dormition versus Assumption ==
Eastern Christians celebrate the Dormition of the Theotokos on August 15 (August 28, N.S. for those following the Julian Calendar), the same calendar day as the Roman Catholic Feast of the Assumption of Mary. "Dormition" and "Assumption" are the different names respectively in use by the Eastern and Western traditions relating to the end of Mary's life and to her departure from the earth, although the beliefs are not necessarily identical. Both views agree that she was taken up into heaven bodily.

=== Orthodox view ===
The Orthodox Church specifically holds one of the two Roman Catholic alternative beliefs, teaching that Mary died a natural death, like any human being; that her soul was received by Christ upon death; and that her body was resurrected on the third day after her repose, at which time she was taken up, both in body and soul, into heaven when the apostles, miraculously transported from the ends of the earth, found her tomb to be empty. The specific belief of the Orthodox is expressed in their liturgical texts used at the feast of the Dormition.

The Eastern Catholic observance of the feast corresponds to that of their Orthodox counterparts, whether Eastern Orthodox or Oriental Orthodox.

=== Catholic view ===
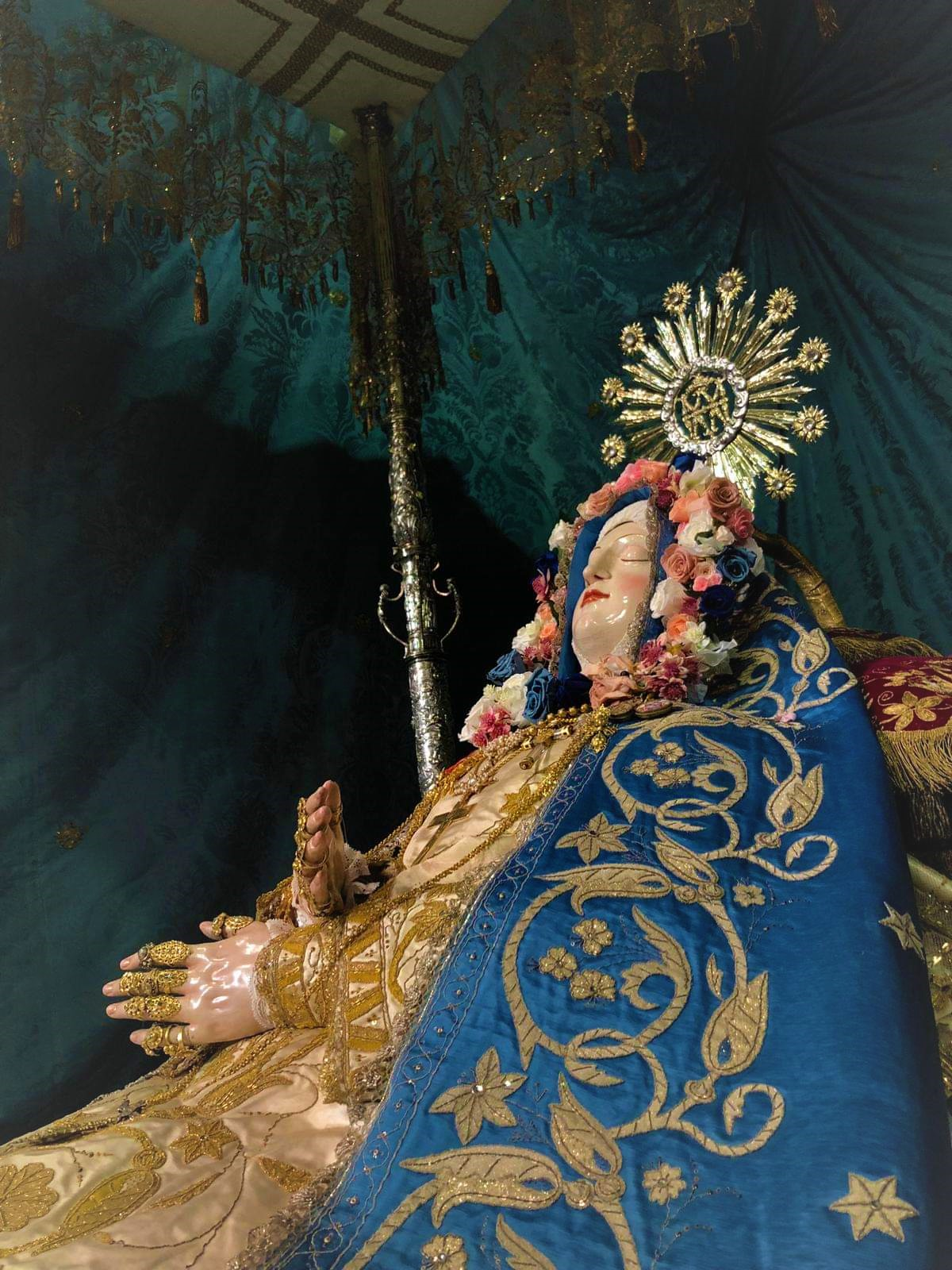
Our Lady of the Transit venerated in Zamora (Spain)

The Catholic doctrine of the Assumption covers Mary's bodily assumption to heaven, but the dogmatic definition avoids saying whether she was dead or alive at that point. The question had long been in dispute in Catholic theology; although Catholic art normally portrays her as alive at the point of assumption, but typically rising from a sarcophagus, many Catholics believe she had died in the normal way. Pope Pius XII alludes to the fact of her death at least five times, but left open the question of whether or not Mary actually underwent death in connection with her departure, in his Apostolic constitution, Munificentissimus Deus (1950), which dogmatically defined ex cathedra (i.e., infallibly) the Assumption.

On 25 June 1997 during a General Audience Pope John Paul II stated that Mary experienced natural death prior to her assumption into Heaven, stating:

It is true that in Revelation death is presented as a punishment for sin. However, the fact that the Church proclaims Mary free from original sin by a unique divine privilege does not lead to the conclusion that she also received physical immortality. The Mother is not superior to the Son who underwent death, giving it a new meaning and changing it into a means of salvation. Involved in Christ's redemptive work and associated in his saving sacrifice, Mary was able to share in his suffering and death for the sake of humanity's Redemption. What Severus of Antioch says about Christ also applies to her: "Without a preliminary death, how could the Resurrection have taken place?" (Antijulianistica, Beirut 1931, 194f.). To share in Christ's Resurrection, Mary had first to share in his death. The New Testament provides no information on the circumstances of Mary's death. This silence leads one to suppose that it happened naturally, with no detail particularly worthy of mention. If this were not the case, how could the information about it have remained hidden from her contemporaries and not have been passed down to us in some way? As to the cause of Mary's death, the opinions that wish to exclude her from death by natural causes seem groundless. It is more important to look for the Blessed Virgin's spiritual attitude at the moment of her departure from this world. In this regard, St Francis de Sales maintains that Mary's death was due to a transport of love. He speaks of a dying "in love, from love and through love", going so far as to say that the Mother of God died of love for her Son Jesus (Treatise on the Love of God, bk. 7, ch. XIII–XIV). Whatever from the physical point of view was the organic, biological cause of the end of her bodily life, it can be said that for Mary the passage from this life to the next was the full development of grace in glory, so that no death can ever be so fittingly described as a "dormition" as hers."

== Liturgical practices ==
=== Byzantine Rite ===
The Feast of the Dormition has a one-day Forefeast and 8 days of Afterfeast. The feast is framed and accentuated by three feasts in honour of Jesus Christ, known as the "Three Feasts of the Saviour in August". These are: the Procession of the Cross (August 1), the Transfiguration (August 6), and the Icon of Christ "Not Made by Hand" (August 16). It is customary in some places to bless fragrant herbage on the Feast of the Dormition.

==== Rite of Burial of the Theotokos ====
In some places, the Rite of the "Burial of the Theotokos" is celebrated at the Dormition, during the All-Night Vigil. The order of the service is based on the service of the Burial of Christ on Great and Holy Saturday. An Epitaphios of the Theotokos, a richly embroidered cloth icon portraying her lying in state is used, together with specially composed hymns of lamentation which are sung with Psalm 118. Special Evlogitaria for the Dormition are chanted, echoing the Evlogitaria of the Resurrection chanted at matins on Sundays throughout the year as well as on Lazarus Saturday and Great and Holy Saturday. This Epitaphios is placed on a bier and carried in procession as is the Epitaphios of Christ on during Great and Holy Saturday.

This practice began in Jerusalem, and from there it was carried to Russia, where it was followed in various Dormition Cathedrals, in particular that of Moscow. The practice slowly spread among the Russian Orthodox, though it is not by any means a standard service in all parishes, or even most cathedrals or monasteries. In Jerusalem, the service is chanted during the Vigil of the Dormition. In some Russian churches and monasteries, it is served on the third day after Dormition.

=== Malankara Rite ===
The Malankara Orthodox Syrian Church, which is an Oriental Orthodox Church, celebrates the Feast of Dormition on August 15 with great importance, as that day is the national independence day of India.

=== Maronite ===
The Maronite Church has a tradition that their Third Anaphora of the Apostle Peter or Sharrar (the Maronite redaction of the Holy Qurbana of Addai and Mari) was originally composed for and used at the funeral of the Theotokos. This tradition probably developed because in its final form the anaphora has twelve paragraphs, i.e., one for each concelebrating apostle present at the funeral mass of the Theotokos.

== Depiction in art ==
=== Byzantine art ===
In Byzantine art and that of later Orthodox schools the standard depiction shows the body of the Theotokos lying dead on a bed or bier. Behind this stands, or floats, Christ holding a small body wrapped in a winding cloth, representing the soul of the Theotokos. He often has a mandorla around him. The apostles surround the bier, and the sky may have figures of angels, saints and prophets. Christ is shown higher than the apostles, increasingly so in later centuries, so that he seems to be floating in the air above rather than standing on the ground like the apostles. But his feet are always hidden behind the bier, leaving this ambiguous.

There are similarities between the traditional depictions of the Dormition of the Theotokos in Byzantine icons and the account of the death of the Egyptian Desert Father, Sisoes the Great. In both Christ is seen coming to receive the soul of the dying saint surrounded by an aureola or cloud of blinding light and accompanied by the angels and prophets. Other Byzantine icons that show Christ surrounded by such a cloud of light are the Transfiguration, the Resurrection and the Last Judgment. In some icons of the Dormition the Theotokos is depicted at the top of the icon in a similar aureola before the opening gates of heaven. This suggests that contemporary accounts of the deaths of the Desert Fathers accompanied by a sudden burst of light came to influence the development of the iconography of the Dormition.

=== Catholic art ===
The Dormition is known as the Death of the Virgin in Catholic art, where it is a reasonably common subject, mostly drawing on Byzantine models, until the end of the Middle Ages. But often the moment just after death is shown, without Christ, but with the apostles crowded around the bed. The Death of the Virgin by Caravaggio, of 1606, is probably the last famous Western painting of the subject. After this depictions of the Assumption become usual, with the Virgin shown alive, rising to Heaven.

=== Gallery ===
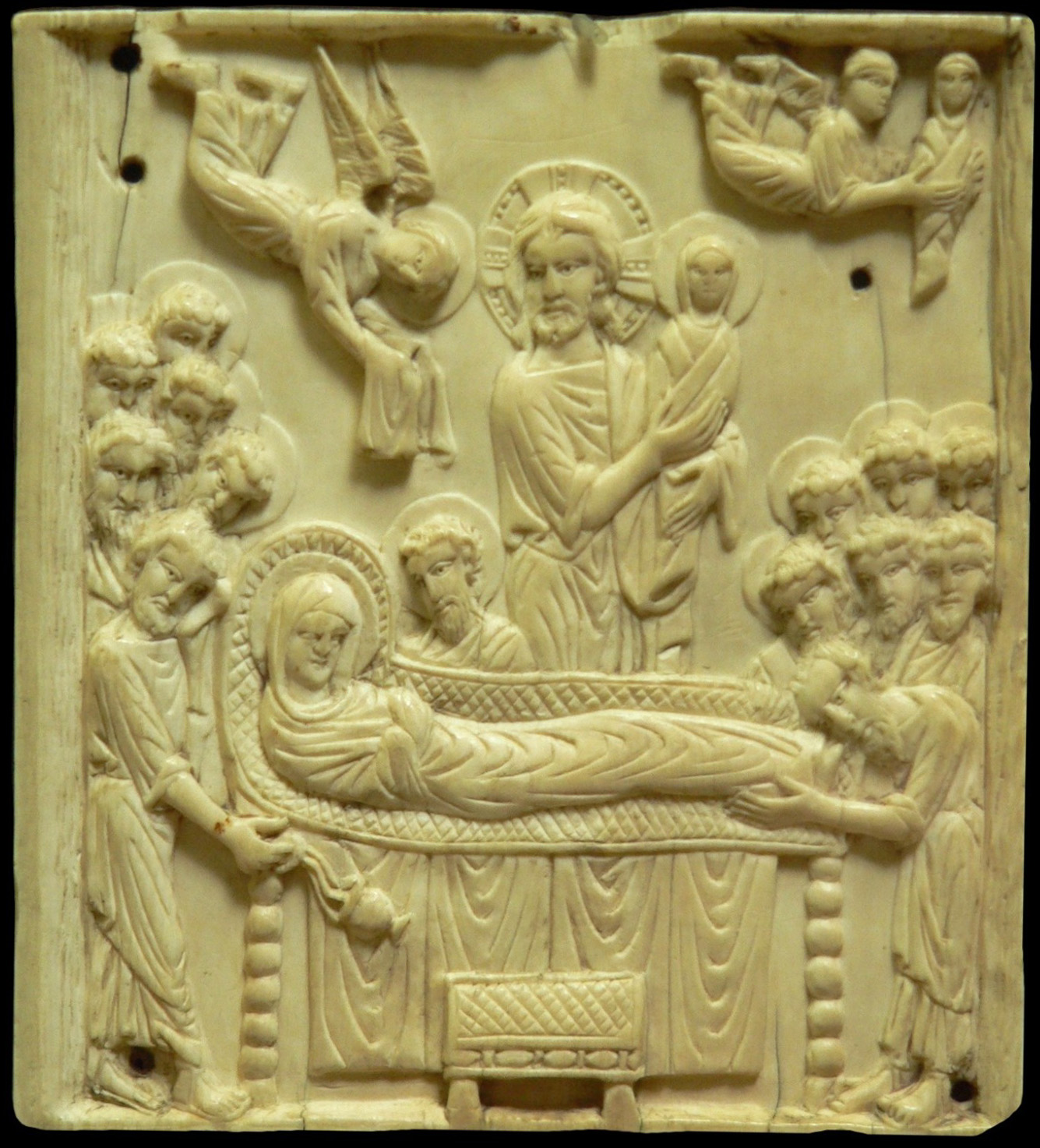
The Dormition: ivory plaque, late 10th to early 11th century (Musée de Cluny)

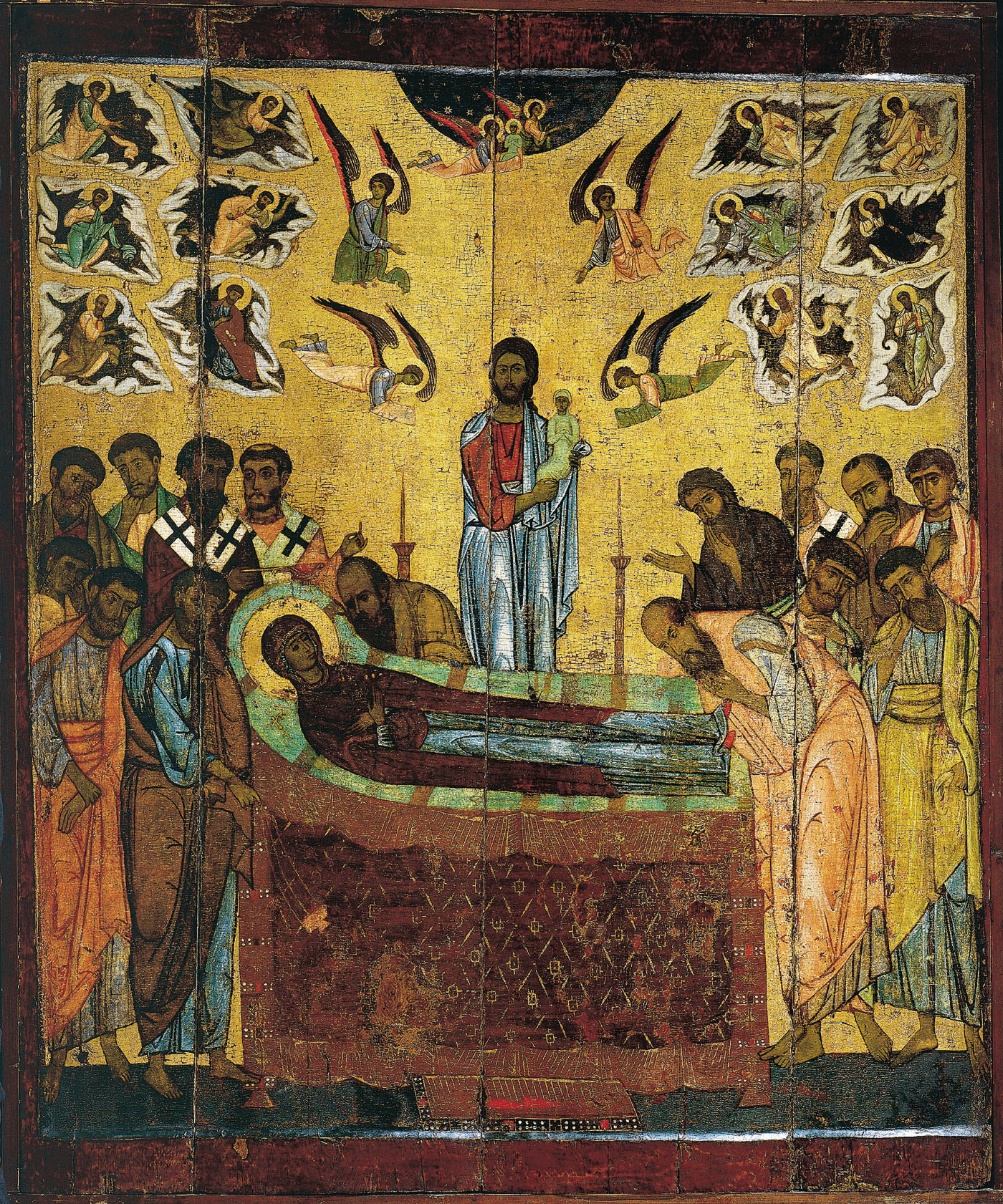
12th-century rendition of the Dormition by a Novgorod artist

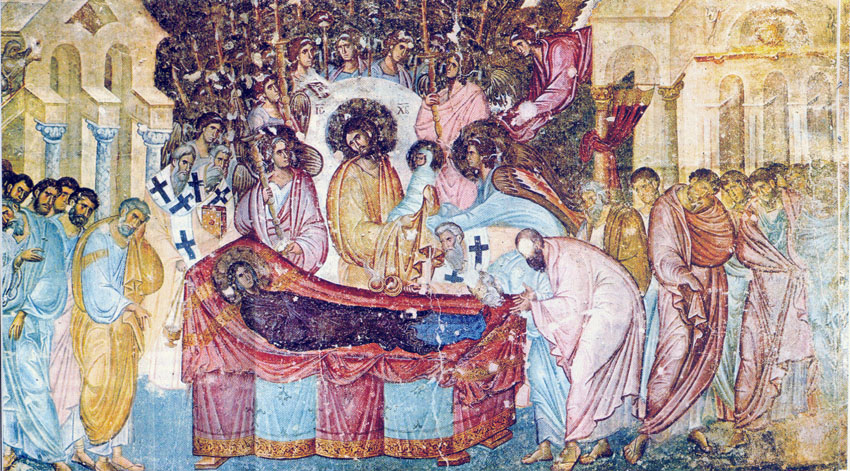
Uspenje presvete Bogorodice, 40-square-metre fresco from 1265, Sopoćani Monastery, Serbia

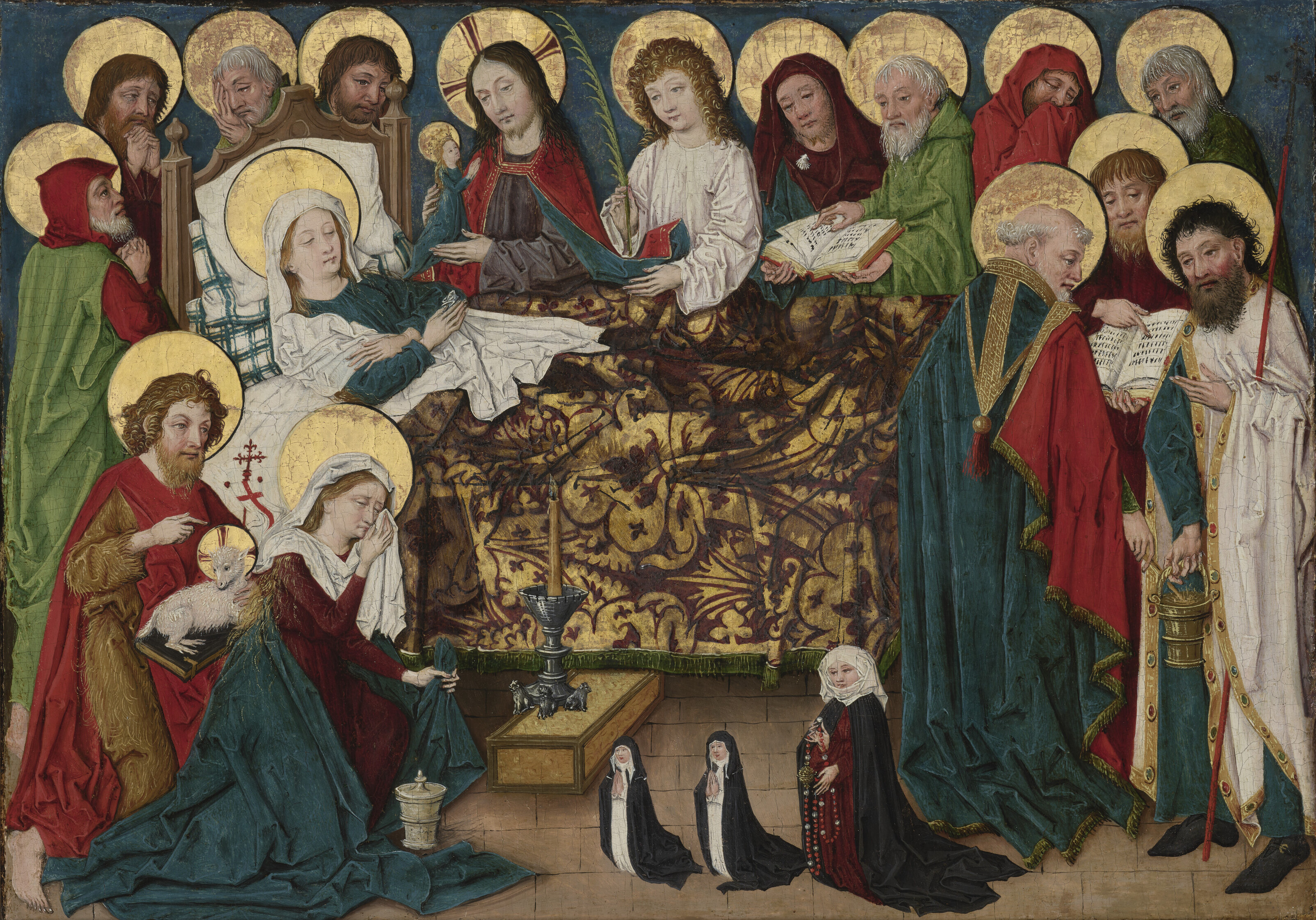
oil on panel, c. 1480-90, Master of the Drapery Studies, National Museum in Kraków

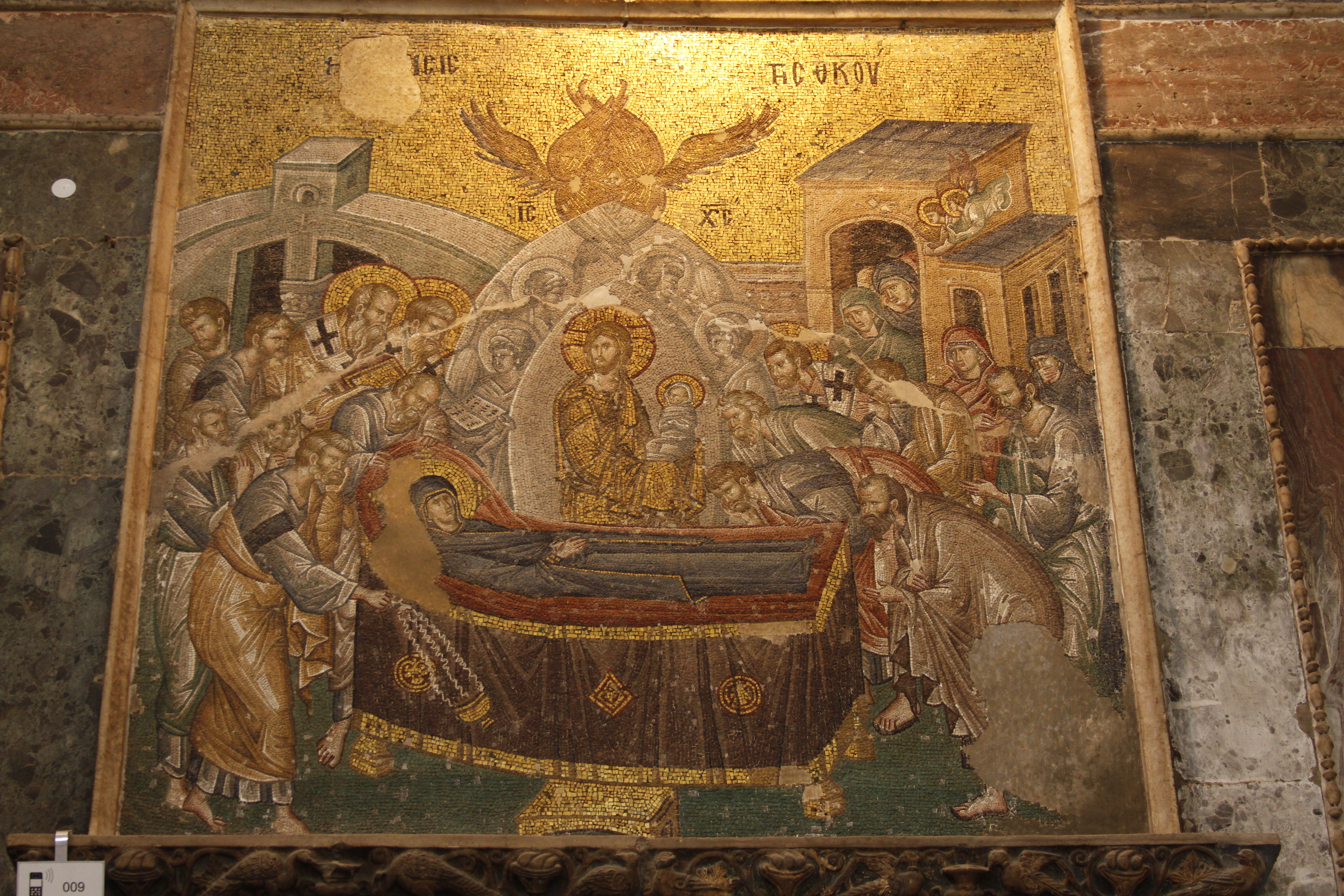
Koimesis Mosaic at the Chora Church, Constantinople

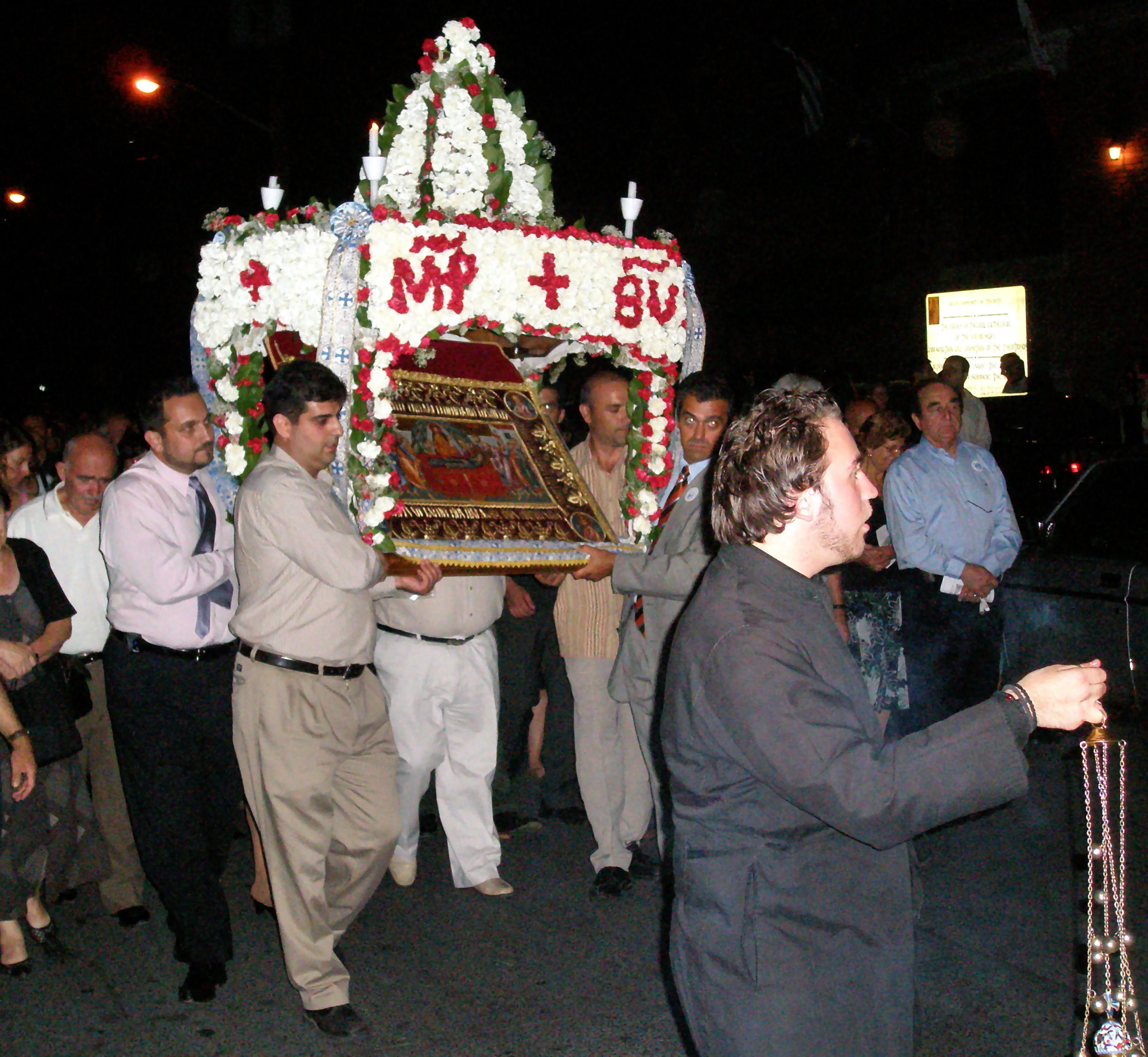
Procession of the Epitaphios of the Theotokos, Toronto

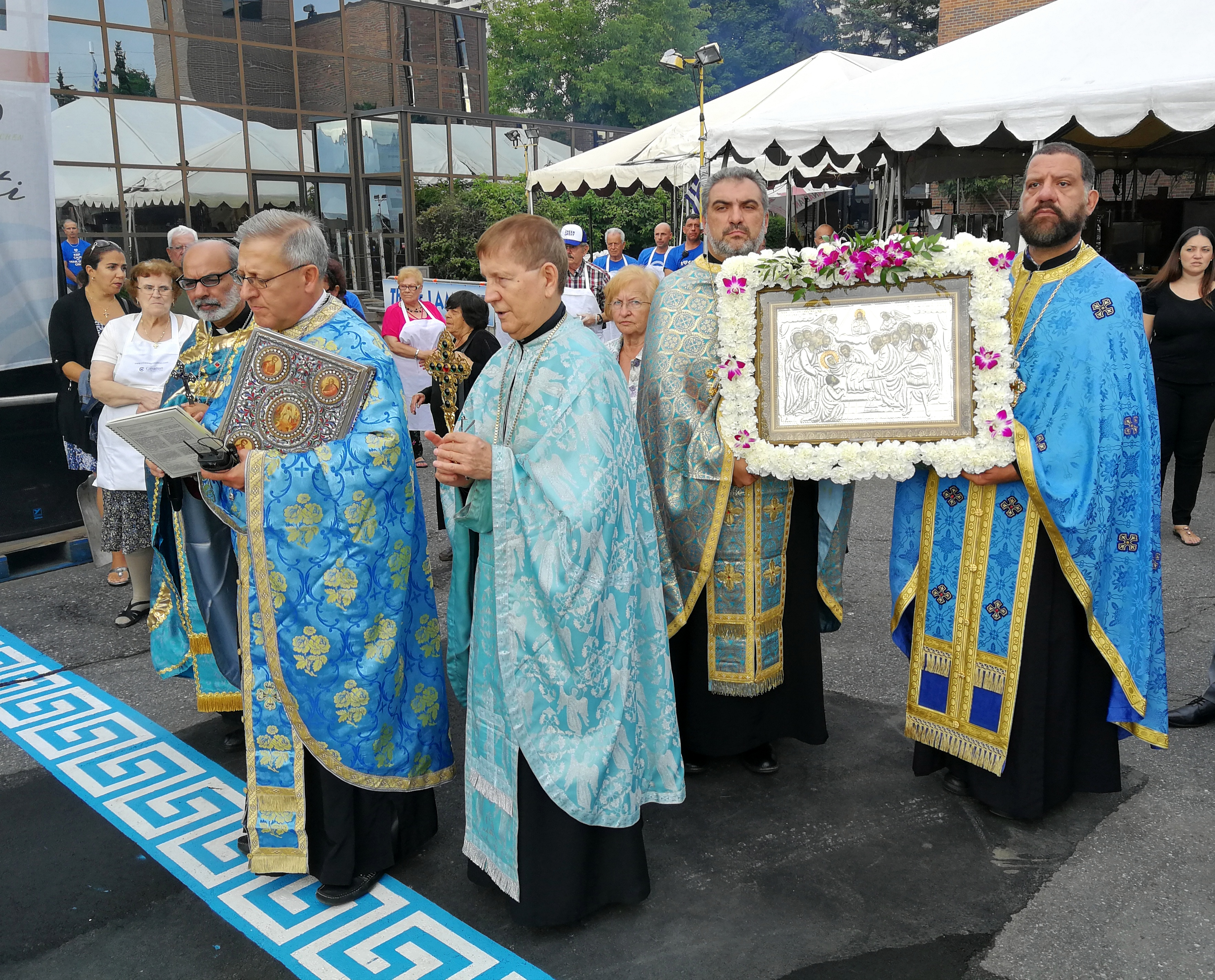
Procession of the Epitaphios of the Theotokos, Ottawa

== See also ==
- Assumption of Mary
- Cathedral of the Dormition of the Theotokos – many cathedrals, especially in Russia, are dedicated to this feast.
- Assumption Cathedral
- Death of the Virgin – the same subject in Western art
- Panagia Skripou Monastery
