= Melito of Sardis =

2nd-century Christian apologist and saint

Saint Melito of Sardis
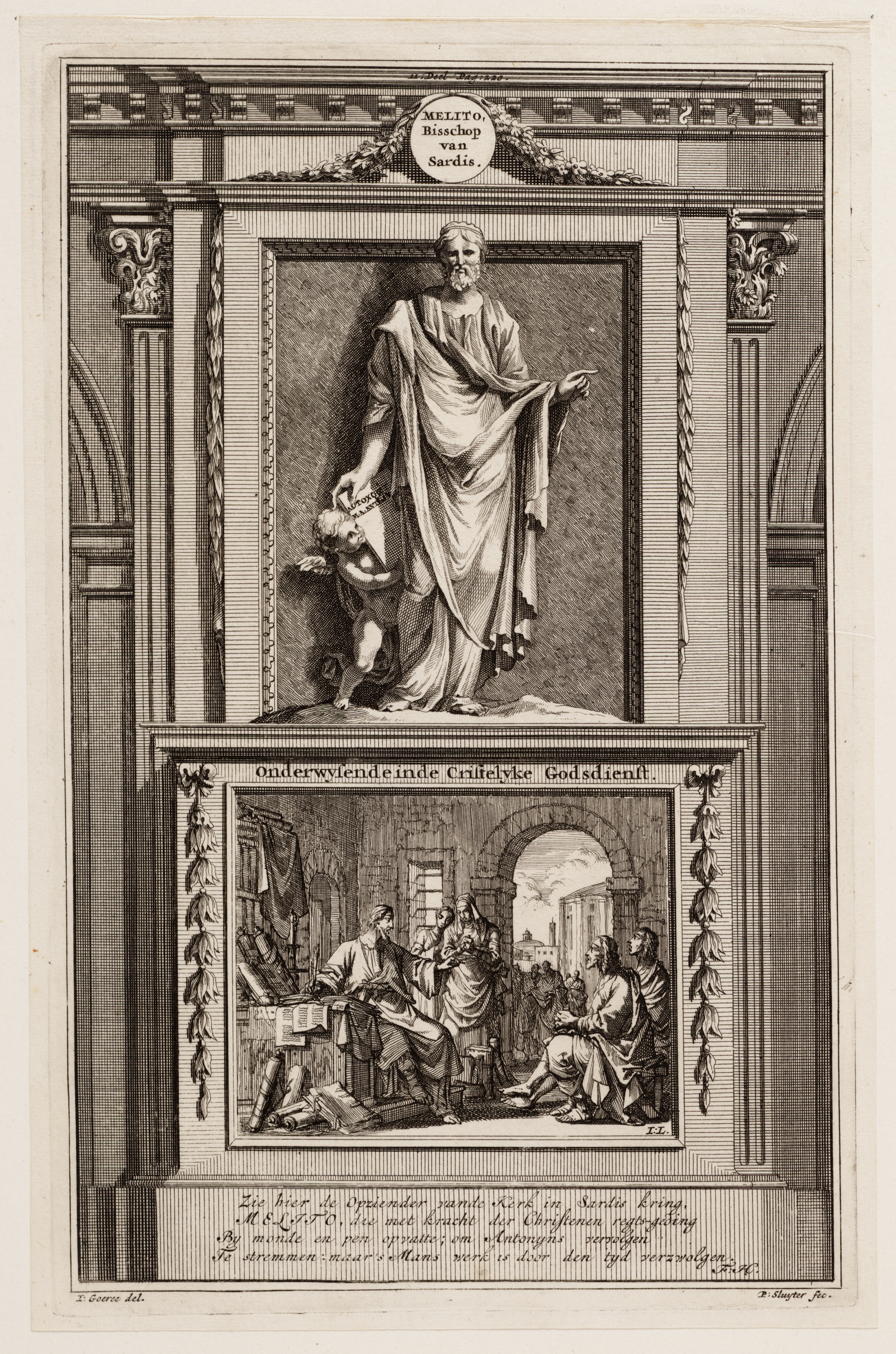

Apologist and Bishop of Sardis
- Born: c. 100
- Died: c. 180 (age 80)
- Venerated in: Catholic Church; Eastern Orthodox Church
- Canonized: Pre-Congregation
- Feast: 1 April

Melito of Sardis (Greek: Μελίτων Σάρδεων Melítōn Sárdeōn; died c. 180) was a Roman Christian prelate who served as Bishop of Sardis, near Smyrna in western Anatolia. He held a foremost place among the early Christian bishops in Roman Asia due to his personal influence and his literary works, most of which have been lost. What has been recovered, however, has provided a great insight into Christianity during the second century.

Jerome, speaking of the Old Testament canon established by Melito, quotes Tertullian to the effect that he was esteemed as a prophet by many of the faithful. This work by Tertullian has been lost, but Jerome quotes sections regarding Melito for the high regard in which he was held at that time. Melito is remembered for his work on developing the first Old Testament canon. Though it cannot be determined what date he was elevated to the episcopacy, it is probable that he was bishop during the controversy that arose at Laodicea in regard to the observance of Easter, a controversy that led to his writing his most famous work, an Apology for Christianity to Marcus Aurelius. Little is known of his life outside the works which were quoted or had been read by Clement of Alexandria, Origen, and Eusebius.

A letter of Polycrates of Ephesus to Pope Victor dated about 194 (Eusebius, Church History V.24) states that "Melito the eunuch [this is interpreted "the virgin" by Rufinus in his translation of Eusebius], whose whole walk was in the Holy Spirit", was buried at Sardis. His feast day is celebrated on April 1.

== Jewish and Hellenistic roots ==
Polycrates of Ephesus, a notable bishop of the time, was a contemporary of Melito, and in one of his letters preserved by Eusebius, Polycrates describes Melito as having lived fully in the Spirit. Jewish by birth, Melito lived in an atmosphere where Christianity bore a strong Jewish imprint. Though Melito's extant writings never quote directly from the New Testament corpus, it is thought that his orientation represents the Johannine tradition, and that his theological understanding of Christ often mirrored that of John. However, like most of his contemporaries, Melito was fully immersed in Greek culture. This Johannine tradition led Melito to consider the Gospel of John as the chronological timeline of Jesus's life and death. This in turn led to Melito's standpoint on the proper date of Easter discussed in Peri Pascha. For him, the date was the 14th of Nisan. He is often described, based on a passage in Eusebius, as a Quartodecimanist.

Formerly the capital of the Kingdom of Lydia, Sardis underwent a process of Hellenization due to the influence of Alexander the Great, and it had thus became a thoroughly Greek city long before Melito was born. Trained in the art of rhetorical argumentation, Melito is believed to have been greatly influenced by two Stoic philosophers in particular, namely, Cleanthes and Poseidonius. Melito was also proficient in the allegorical interpretation of Homer, a legacy of his being schooled by sophists. It is highly likely that his background in Stoicism fed into his writing and how he interpreted past events and figures of religious significance such as Moses and the Exodus. Both his Jewish and his Stoic background affected his opinion that the Christian Passover, celebrated during Holy Week, should be celebrated at the same time as the Jewish Passover. His belief in the Old Covenant being fulfilled in Jesus Christ also led to his opinion regarding the date of Easter.

== Peri Pascha ==
Written during the second century AD, and only coming to light within the modern world due to the efforts of Campbell Bonner in 1940, some have argued that Peri Pascha (On the Passover) is not a homily, but is a liturgy based on the haggadah, which is a retelling of the works of God at Passover. The Quartodeciman celebration mainly being a commemoration of Christ's passion and death, Melito stood by the belief that Christ died on the evening of the 14th, when the Passover meal was being prepared. F. L. Cross states that Melito's treatise on Pascha is “the most important addition to Patristic literature in the present century”. Aside from the liturgical function of the Peri Pascha, this early Christian document has traditionally been perceived as a somewhat reliable indicator concerning how early Christians felt toward Judaism in general. The Peri Pascha provides an accurate description of Christian feelings towards Jews at the time and their opinion of Judaism. The Jewish people are explicitly blamed for killing Christ. Melito does not blame Pontius Pilate for the crucifixion of Jesus Christ, and his presentation helped to feed and establish the anti-Jewish tropes that persist to this day. Melito is widely remembered for his supersessionism, a belief that the Jewish people fail to fulfill the Old Covenant due to their lack of belief in Jesus Christ. However, he was not satisfied with dismissing Judaism as misguided, and compared Jewish practice to a first draft that, in the wake of Christianity, ought to be "destroyed" or "dissolved." He closes with the fervid accusation "you smashed the Lord to the ground, you were razed to the ground. And you lie dead, while he rose from the dead.

== Quartodeciman controversy ==
Attracting the attention of persons such as Epiphanius of Salamis, John Chrysostom, and Pseudo-Hippolytus, Quartodeciman practices have encouraged many to deeply ponder questions pertaining to the duration of the period of fasting, and when it should end within the celebration of any Christian Passover. Another question which bothered many individuals was whether everyone ought to uniformly observe Easter on the same day. Melito thought that the Christian Passover should be on the 14th of Nisan, but the Council of Nicaea determined that Jesus Christ's resurrection from the dead should always be celebrated on a Sunday. Uniformity in church practice was thus the primary drive behind this initiative. Known for following a Johannine chronology, and for believing in a paschal lamb typology, Quartodeciman thought is constituted as such. One of the issues raised is that Quartodeciman thought is the idea that Christian Passover would be celebrated at the same time as Jewish Passover. Ultimately the Council of Nicea decided otherwise and agreed that it would always be on a Sunday.

== Apology to Marcus Aurelius ==
During the controversy in Laodicea over the observance of Easter, Melito presented an Apology for Christianity to Marcus Aurelius, according to Eusebius, in his Chronicon, during 169–170 AD. A Syriac translation of this apology was rediscovered and placed in a British museum where it was translated into English by William Cureton. In this apology, Melito describes Christianity as a philosophy that had originated among the barbarians, but had attained to a flourishing status under the Roman Empire. Melito asks the emperor to rethink the accusations against the Christians and to renounce the edict against them. Melito argues that Christianity had in no way weakened the empire which continued to grow despite the presence of Christianity. Complaining about how the godly are being persecuted and harassed by new decrees, Christians are openly robbed and plundered by those who are taking advantage of the said ordinances. The suffering of Christians at the time in regard to these decrees was mostly of property and taxations while not as much physical suffering. Certainly Christians were persecuted physically as well but in terms of the decrees they were openly robbed and considered to be incestuous and take part in ritualistic acts such as eating children. Melito aimed to dispel the suffering of the Christian people and to change the Greek opinion of them. Demonstrating how Christian thought first flourished among the Gentiles, and how it has benefited the empire, Melito tried to convince the emperor to rethink his current policies since Christianity only brought greatness and success to Rome. Reminding the emperor of the virtuous conduct of Hadrian, Melito called for an end to all violence toward the growing Christian communities within the empire.

== Melito's high Christology ==
Emphasizing, like John, the unity of Christ and the Father, Melito declared that Christ is at once God and a perfect man. Having two essences while being one and the same, his godhead was demonstrated by way of all of the signs and miracles he performed after being baptized. Successfully managing to hide his divinity from the world before that central event occurred with John the Baptist, Jesus felt the pangs of hunger just like everyone else. Writing against Marcion, Melito focused on Christ's divinity and humanity in order to counter the claim that Jesus was simply and uniquely divine; having no material counterpart. Melito does not anthropomorphize the divine nature of Christ and keeps the attributes of the divine nature and the human nature wholly separate. While he describes the attributes of each nature separately, he also speaks of the two natures of Christ combined. The form of speech used is that of two natures in one Christ. According to Melito, Jesus Christ was both entirely human and entirely divine.

== Old Testament canon ==
Melito gave the first Christian list of the canon in the Old Testament. In his canon he excludes the Book of Esther, Book of Nehemiah and all the Apocrypha. It is argued that Esdras is referring to another book which isn't the Book of Ezra, and Lamentations (that is not separately named in the canon) is left out. The standard reading tells us that Esdras is just Ezra, which would have likely included Nehemiah, and that Lamentations would have been included as part of the mentioning of Jeremiah. There is also debate on whether he includes Wisdom of Solomon. Scholars have argued that this is an alternative name for the Book of Proverbs however Eusebius mentions it as a separate book, so the standard reading would conclude that the Wisdom of Solomon is included in Melito's canon. Around 170 after traveling to The Levant, and probably visiting the library at Caesarea Maritima, Melito compiled the earliest known Christian canon of the Old Testament, a term he coined. A passage cited by Eusebius contains Melito's famous canon of the Old Testament. In Eklogai, six books of extracts from the Law and the Prophets concerning Christ and the Christian faith, Melito presented elaborate parallels between the Old Testament or Old Covenant, which he likened to the form or mold, and the New Testament or New Covenant, which he likened to the truth that broke the mold.

== Millennialism ==
It is thought by some that Melito, following the likes of Irenaeus, was a chiliast who expected a millennial reign of Christ on Earth. This impression is sometimes based upon information conveyed by Jerome and Gennadius. These ancient sources, however, are far from conclusive on Melito's position. Jerome nowhere mentions Melito in connection with millennialism, even if at Comm. on Ezek. 36 he does mention Tertullian, Lactantius, Victorinus of Petovium, Irenaeus, and Apollinaris of Laodicea as being chiliasts. Nor does Jerome suggest that Melito was a chiliast in his description of Melito's life and work in On Virtuous Men 24. The same is true for the source on which Jerome likely draws for his information on Melito: Eusebius of Caesarea's Church History 4.26.2–4. Gennadius (De Dogm. Eccl., Ch. 52) likely does not refer to Melito of Sardis at all in his reference to the Meletians but rather to Meletius of Lycopolis, who together with his followers may have been chiliasts.

== Death and legacy ==
In regard to the death of Melito, there is not much information preserved or recorded. Polycrates of Ephesus, in a letter addressed to Pope Victor (AD 196) preserved in Eusebius' history, says, "What shall I say of Melito, whose actions were all guided by the operations of the Holy Spirit? Who was interred at Sardis, where he waits the resurrection and the judgement?". From this it may be deduced that at some point prior to the date of this letter, Melito he had died at Sardis, the latter being the place of his interment.

Melito's reputation as a writer remained strong into the Middle Ages: numerous works were pseudepigraphically ascribed to him. Melito was especially skilled in the literature of the Old Testament, and was one of the most prolific authors of his time. Eusebius furnished a list of Melito's works. While many of these works are lost, the testimony of the fathers remains to inform us how highly they were viewed. Eusebius presents some fragments of Melito's works and some others are found in the works of different writers. Fragments of his works found preserved in a Syriac translation are now stored in the library of the British Museum. Cureton has translated some and others have been published in Kitto's Journal of Sacred Literature, vol. 15. Due to Melito's reputation, many works are falsely attributed to him due to the lack of recorded literature surrounding him.
