= Easter controversy =

Controversy over the correct date for Easter

The controversy over the correct date for Easter began in Early Christianity as early as the 2nd century AD. Discussion and disagreement over the best method of computing the date of Easter Sunday has been ongoing ever since and remains unresolved. Different Christian denominations continue to celebrate Easter on different dates, with Orthodox (Eastern) and Western Christian churches being a notable example.

== Quartodecimanism ==
Quartodecimanism (from the Vulgate Latin quarta decima in Leviticus 23:5, meaning fourteenth) is the practice of celebrating Easter on the 14th of Nisan at the same time as the Jewish Passover. Quartodecimanism caused two schisms, one headed by Blastus in Rome and one headed by Polycrates in the East.

== First Council of Nicaea in 325 ==
In 325 an ecumenical council, the First Council of Nicaea, established two rules: independence from the Jewish calendar, and worldwide uniformity. However, it did not provide any explicit rules to determine that date, writing only "all our brethren in the East who formerly followed the custom of the Jews are henceforth to celebrate the said most sacred feast of Easter at the same time with the Romans and yourselves [the Church of Alexandria] and all those who have observed Easter from the beginning." Shortly before the Nicean Council, in 314, the Provincial Council of Arles in Gaul had maintained that the Lord's Pasch should be observed on the same day throughout the world and that each year the Bishop of Rome should send out letters setting the date of Easter.

== Synod of Whitby in 664 ==
The Roman missionaries coming to Britain in the time of Pope Gregory I (590–604) found the British Christians adhering to a different system of Easter computation from that used in the Mediterranean basin. This system, on the evidence of Bede, fixed Easter to the Sunday falling in the seven-day period from the 14th to the 20th of its lunar month, according to an 84-year cycle. The limits of Nisan 14 – Nisan 20 are corroborated by Columbanus. The method used by the Roman Church was Nisan 15 – Nisan 21. The 84-year cycle, the lunar limits, and an equinox of March 25 also receive support from McCarthy's analysis of Padua, Biblioteca Antoniana, MS I.27. Any of these features alone could have led to occasional discrepancies from the date of Easter as computed by the Alexandrian method.

This 84-year cycle (called the latercus) gave way to the Alexandrian computus in stages. The Alexandrian computus may have been adopted in parts of the south of Ireland in the first half of the 7th century. Among the northern English, the use of the Alexandrian computus over the Britanno-Irish cycle was decided at the Synod of Whitby in 664. The Alexandrian computus was finally adopted by the Irish colonies in northern Britain in the early 8th century.

== Modern calls for a reform of the date of Easter ==
After the Gregorian reform of the calendar by promulgation in 1582, the Catholic Church continued to follow the same method for computing the date of Easter but the resulting date differed from that computed using the Julian calendar due to the difference in time regarding when the vernal equinox was deemed to occur and when the relevant full moon fell. The Protestant churches of the Christian West all eventually adopted the Gregorian calendar at various later stages. The Eastern Orthodox Church and the majority of the Christian East changed to the Revised Julian calendar in 1924 while some continue the older practice aligned to the Julian calendar.

Several attempts have sought to achieve a common method for computing the date of Easter.

In 1997 the World Council of Churches proposed a reform of the method of determining the date of Easter at a summit in Aleppo, Syria: Easter would be defined as the first Sunday following the first astronomical full moon following the astronomical vernal equinox, as determined from the meridian of Jerusalem. The reform would have been implemented starting in 2001, since in that year the Eastern and Western dates of Easter would coincide. This proposal, however, was never implemented.

== See also ==
- Computus
- Epact
- Sardica paschal table
- Gregorian calendar
- Reform of the date of Easter
