= Quartodecimanism =

Observing the Easter on the eve of 14 Nisan

Quartodecimanism (from the Vulgate Latin quarta decima in Leviticus 23:5, meaning fourteenth) is the name given to the practice of commemorating the death of Christ on the day of Passover, the 14th of Nisan according to biblical dating, on whatever day of the week it occurs. The Quartodeciman controversy in the Church was the question of whether to celebrate Easter on Sunday (the first day of the week), or at the time of sacrifice of the Passover lamb.

== History ==
=== Early Christianity ===
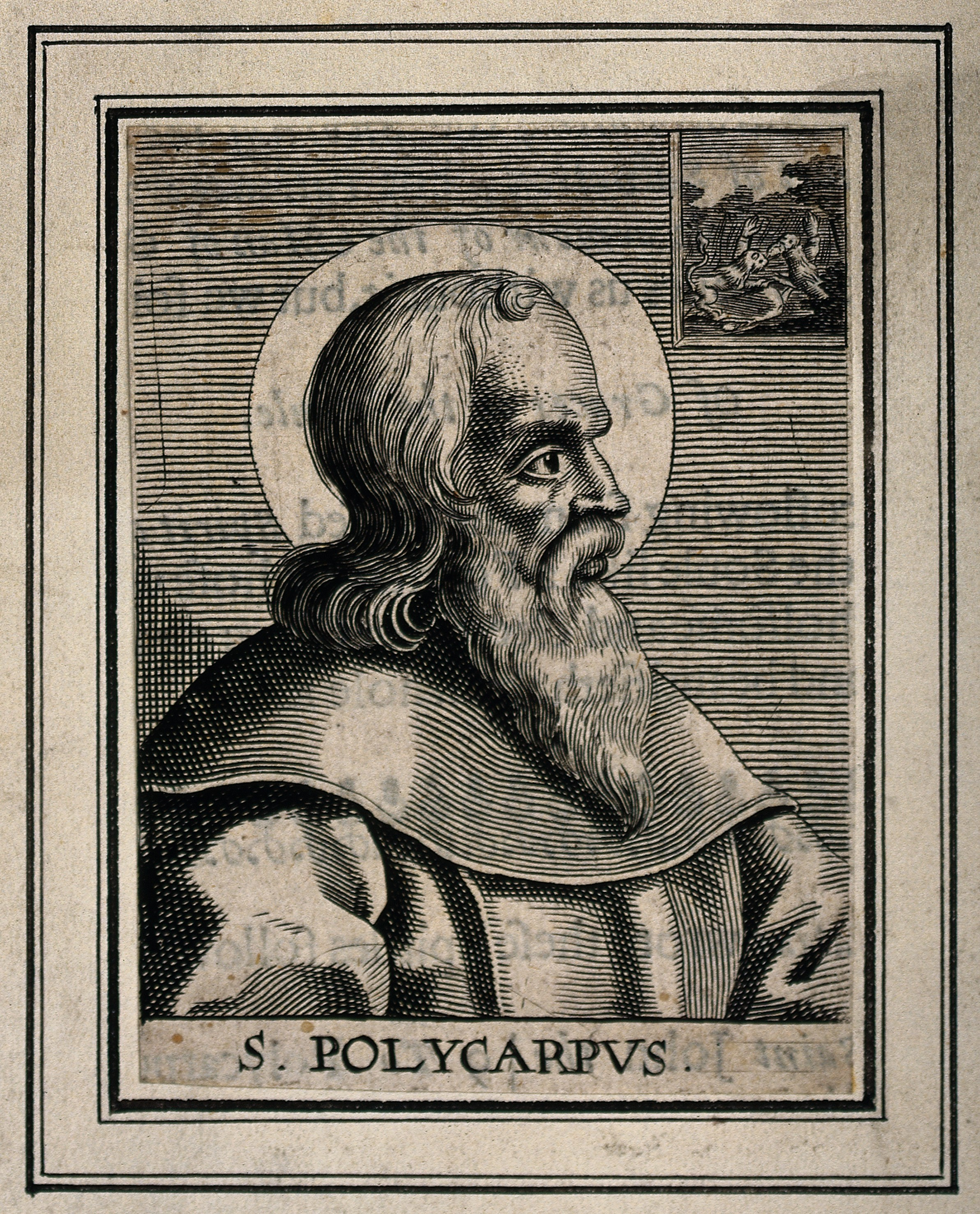
Saint Polycarp was a Quartodeciman.

There is scholarly disagreement on which tradition is the original. Some scholars believe that Sunday observance began before Quartodecimanism, while others have argued that Quartodecimanism was original. The Quartodecimans claimed that their traditions are inherited from the Apostles John and Philip, while western churches claimed that their views of Easter have been inherited from Paul and Peter. Quartodecimanism was popular in Asia Minor, Jerusalem and Syria, however it was rejected by churches in other regions. Polycarp, like other Asiatics, kept Easter on the fourteenth day of the month of Nisan. According to Eusebius, Polycarp claimed that his practice came from the apostle John. Some of the Montanists were also Quartodeciman. Montanism brought Quartodeciman practices to the west, for example Blastus was a Roman Montanist who was also a Quartodeciman. It is unclear if the Ebionites were Quartodeciman, however they probably observed Passover in addition to other Jewish festivals.

Melito of Sardis, Sagar of Laodicea, Papirius of Smyrna, perhaps Apollinaris of Laodicea and Polycrates of Ephesus held Quartodeciman views. The Didascalia likely drew from a Quartodeciman source. Some Novatians that spread into the east were Quartodecimans.

By the 4th century the influence of Quartodecimans declined; later they would even be persecuted.

The opponents of Quartodecimanism argued that it is a form of Judaizing.

=== Roman Schism ===
Blastus, a Montanist caused a schism in Rome about the date of Easter, argued that Christians must keep Easter at the same time commanded in Exodus for the Passover and gained a following in Rome, and was then accused of Judaizing by the Church. This schism in Rome likely influenced the hostility of Pope Victor I against Quartodecimanism.

=== Quartodeciman controversy ===
The Quartodeciman controversy arose because Christians in Jerusalem and Asia Minor observed Easter on the date of Passover, the 14th day of the first month of the Hebrew calendar (Nisan), regardless of the day of the week on which it occurred, while the churches in and around Rome celebrated Easter on the Sunday following first Full Moon following the vernal equinox, calling it "the day of the resurrection of our Saviour". The difference became an ecclesiastical controversy when the practice was condemned by synods of bishops.

==== Background ====
Of the disputes over the date when the Lord's Supper (Eucharist) should be celebrated, disputes known as Paschal/Easter controversies, the quartodeciman is the first recorded.

In the mid–2nd century, the practice in Asia Minor was for the pre-Paschal fast to end with a feast held on the 14th day of Nisan, when the barley was ripe after the new moon near the Jewish lunar month of Nisan (no matter the day of the week on which it occurred), the date on which the Passover sacrifice had been offered when the Second Temple stood, and "the day when the people put away the leaven". Those who observed this practice were called quartodecimani, Latin for "fourteenthers", because of holding their celebration on the 14th day of Nisan.

The practice had been followed by Polycarp, who was a disciple of John the Apostle and bishop of Smyrna (c. 69 – c. 155) - one of the seven churches of Asia, and by Melito of Sardis (d. c. 180). Irenaeus says that Polycarp visited Rome when Anicetus was its bishop (c. 68–153), and among the topics discussed was this divergence of custom, with Rome celebrating the Easter always on Sunday. Irenaeus noted:

Neither could Anicetus persuade Polycarp not to observe what he had always observed with John the disciple of our Lord, and the other apostles with whom he had associated; neither could Polycarp persuade Anicetus to observe it, as he said that he ought to follow the customs of the presbyters that had preceded him.

— Eusebius 1890, Book V Chapter 24

But neither considered that the disagreement required them to break off communion and initiate a schism. Indeed, "Anicetus conceded the administration of the Eucharist in the church to Polycarp, manifestly as a mark of respect. And they parted from each other in peace, both those who observed, and those who did not, maintaining the peace of the whole church."

Sozomen also wrote:

As the bishops of the West did not deem it necessary to dishonor the tradition believed to be handed down to them by Peter and by Paul, and as, on the other hand, the Asiatic bishops persisted in following the rules laid down by John the evangelist, they unanimously agreed to continue in the observance of the festival according to their respective customs, without separation from communion with each other. They faithfully and justly assumed, that those who accorded in the essentials of worship ought not to separate from one another on account of customs.

— Sozomen 1890, Book VII Chapter 19

A modern source says that the discussion between Polycarp and Anicetus in Rome took place within the framework of a synod.

Thus the churches in Asia appealed to the Apostle John in support of their practice, while Sozomen wrote that the Roman custom (observed, according to Irenaeus, since at least the time of Bishop Xystus of 115–25) was believed to have been handed down by the Apostles Peter and Paul, and Eusebius states that in Judea and Egypt the Sunday observance was also believed to have originated with the Apostles.

=== Condemnatory synods ===
According to Eusebius, in the last decade of the 2nd century a number of synods were convened to deal with the controversy, ruling unanimously that the celebration of Easter should be observed and be exclusively on Sunday.

Synods and conferences of bishops were convened, and drew up a decree of the Church, in the form of letters addressed to Christians everywhere, that never on any day other than the Lord's Day should the mystery of the Lord's resurrection from the dead be celebrated, and on that day alone we should observe the end of the Easter fast.

— Eusebius 1890, Book V Chapter 23

These synods were held in Palestine, Pontus and Osrhoene in the east, and in Rome and Gaul in the west. The council in Rome, presided over by its bishop Victor, took place in 193 and sent a letter about the matter to Polycrates of Ephesus and the churches of the Roman province of Asia. Within the same year, Polycrates presided over a council at Ephesus attended by several bishops throughout that province, which rejected Victor's authority and kept the province's paschal tradition.

Polycrates emphatically stated that he was following the tradition passed down to him:

We observe the exact day; neither adding, nor taking away. For in Asia also great lights have fallen asleep, which shall rise again on the day of the Lord's coming ... Among these are Philip, one of the twelve apostles, who fell asleep in Hierapolis; and his two aged virgin daughters, and another daughter, who lived in the Holy Spirit and now rests at Ephesus; and, moreover, John, who was both a witness and a teacher, who reclined upon the bosom of the Lord, and, being a priest, wore the sacerdotal plate. All these observed the fourteenth day of the Passover according to the Gospel, deviating in no respect, but following the rule of faith. And I also, Polycrates, the least of you all, do according to the tradition of my relatives, some of whom I have closely followed. For seven of my relatives were bishops; and I am the eighth. And my relatives always observed the day when the people put away the leaven. I, therefore, brethren, who have lived sixty-five years in the Lord, and have met with the brethren throughout the world, and have gone through every Holy Scripture, am not affrighted by terrifying words. For those greater than I have said 'We ought to obey God rather than man.'

— Eusebius 1890, Book V Chapter 24

=== Excommunication ===
On receiving the negative response of Polycrates, Victor attempted to cut off Polycrates and the others who took this stance from the common unity, but bishops including Irenaeus, bishop of Lugdunum in Gaul, interceded, recommending that Victor follow the more peaceful attitude of his predecessors. The attempted excommunication did not take effect, though it is unclear if Victor reversed his decision or his excommunication was simply ignored.

Thereupon Victor, who presided over the church at Rome, immediately attempted to cut off from the common unity the parishes of all Asia, with the churches that agreed with them, as heterodox; and he wrote letters and declared all the brethren there wholly excommunicate. But this did not please all the bishops. And they besought him to consider the things of peace, and of neighborly unity and love. Words of theirs are extant, sharply rebuking Victor. Among them was Irenaeus, who, sending letters in the name of the brethren in Gaul over whom he presided, maintained that the mystery of the resurrection of the Lord should be observed only on the "Lord's day" namely Easter. He fittingly admonishes Victor that he should not cut off whole churches of God which observed the tradition of an ancient custom.

— Eusebius 1890, Book V Chapter 24 see Cantalamessa 1993, pp. 33–37

=== Resolution ===
In the short following chapter of the account by Eusebius, a chapter headed "How All came to an Agreement respecting the Passover", he recounts that the Palestinian bishops Narcissus and Theophilus, together with the bishops of Tyre and Ptolemais, wrote a lengthy review of the tradition of Sunday celebration of Easter which believed "had come to them in succession from the apostles", and concluded by saying:

Endeavor to send copies of our epistle to every church, that we may not furnish occasion to those who easily deceive their souls. We show you indeed that also in Alexandria they keep it on the same day that we do. For letters are carried from us to them and from them to us, so that in the same manner and at the same time we keep the sacred day.

— Eusebius 1890, Book V Chapter 25

Historically, there had been a debate about when quartodecimanism disappeared and in particular whether it disappeared before or after the first ecumenical council (Nicaea I) in 325. According to Mark DelCogliano, "the older opinion persists" but Duchesne's opinion "has gained widespread acceptance." According to DelCogliano, "by the early 4th century all Christians were celebrating Easter on a Sunday. Accordingly, it was not the quartodeciman practice that Constantine sought to eliminate, but rather the so-called 'Protopaschite' practice which calculated the paschal full moon according to the Jewish lunar calendar and not the Julian solar calendar".

As shown, for instance, by the Sardica paschal table, it was quite common at that time that the Jewish calendrical year started before and after the equinox according to Exodus 12:2 and Deuteronomy 16:1. In case the previous year had started after the equinox, two Passovers would be celebrated in the same solar year (the solar New Year was starting on March 21). Note: (The word month being Hebrew Chodesh which literally means New Moon which is referenced in Deuteronomy 16:1). Since the 3rd century this disorder of the Jewish calendar of the time was lamented by several Christian writers, who felt that the Jews were often using a wrong lunation as their Nisan month and advocated the introduction of an independent computus by the Christians.

In a letter to the bishops who had not been present, Emperor Constantine I said that it had been decided to adopt a uniform date, rejecting the custom of the Jews, who had crucified Jesus and whose practice often meant that two passovers were celebrated in the same solar year: (Even though there is a commandment to keep a second passover in Numbers 9:10-12 if found unclean to keep the first)

It was resolved by the united judgment of all present, that this feast ought to be kept by all and in every place on one and the same day. For what can be more becoming or honorable to us than that this feast, from which we date our hopes of immortality, should be observed unfailingly by all alike, according to one ascertained order and arrangement? And first of all, it appeared an unworthy thing that in the celebration of this most holy feast we should follow the practice of the Jews, who have impiously defiled their hands with enormous sin, and are, therefore, deservedly afflicted with blindness of soul. For we have it in our power, if we abandon their custom, to prolong the due observance of this ordinance to future ages, by a truer order, which we have preserved from the very day of the passion until the present time. Let us then have nothing in common with the detestable Jewish crowd; for we have received from our Saviour a different way. A course at once legitimate and honorable lies open to our most holy religion. Beloved brethren, let us with one consent adopt this course, and withdraw ourselves from all participation in their baseness... being altogether ignorant of the true adjustment of this question, they sometimes celebrate Pascha (Passover) twice in the same year. Why then should we follow those who are confessedly in grievous error? Surely we shall never consent to keep this feast a second time in the same year... And let your Holinesses' sagacity reflect how grievous and scandalous it is that on the self-same days some should be engaged in fasting, others in festive enjoyment; and again, that after the days of Pascha(Easter) some should be present at banquets and amusements, while others are fulfilling the appointed fasts. It is, then, plainly the will of Divine Providence (as I suppose you all clearly see), that this usage should receive fitting correction, and be reduced to one uniform rule.

—

== Legacy ==
It is not known how long the Nisan 14 practice lasted. The church historian Socrates of Constantinople knew of quartodecimans who were deprived of their churches by John Chrysostom, and harassed in unspecified ways by Nestorius, both bishops of Constantinople. This indicates that the Nisan 14 practice, or a practice that was called by the same name, lingered into the 4th century.

Because this was the first-recorded Paschal/Easter controversy, it has had a strong influence on the minds of some subsequent generations. Wilfrid, the 7th-century bishop of York in Northumbria, styled his opponents in the Paschal/Easter controversy of his day "quartodecimans", though they celebrated Pascha (Easter) on Sunday. Many scholars of the 19th and 20th centuries thought that the dispute over Pascha (Easter) that was discussed at Nicaea was between the Nisan 14 practice and Sunday observance. According to one account, "A final settlement of the dispute was one among the other reasons which led Constantine to summon the council at Nicaea in 325. At that time, the Syrians and Antiochenes were the solitary champions of the observance of the 14th day. The decision of the council was unanimous that Pascha (Easter) was to be kept on Sunday, and on the same Sunday throughout the world, and that 'none hereafter should follow the blindness of the Jews'". A new translation, published in 1999, of Eusebius' Life of Constantine suggests that this view is no longer widely accepted; its view is that the dispute at Nicaea was between two schools of Sunday observance: those who followed the traditional practice of relying on Jewish informants to determine the lunar month of the Nisan in which Passover would fall, and those who wished to set it using Christian computations using the spring equinox on the solar calendar. Laurent Cleenewerck suggests that the East-West schism could even be argued to have started with Victor's attempt to excommunicate the Asian churches. Despite Victor's failure to carry out his intent to excommunicate the Asian churches, many Catholic theologians point to this episode as evidence of papal primacy and authority in the early Church, citing the fact that none of the bishops challenged his right to excommunicate but rather questioned the wisdom and charity of doing so. From the Orthodox perspective, Victor had to relent in the end and we see that the Eastern Churches never grant him presidency over anything other than his own church, his own synod. Cleenewerck points out that Eusebius of Caesarea simply refers to Victor as one of the "rulers of the Churches", not the ruler of a yet unknown or unformed "universal Church". As the date of observance of the Resurrection of Christ as being on the Sunday day of the week rather than the 14th day of the month was not resolved by Papal authority it was only finally resolved by an Ecumenical Council. Epiphanius of Salamis even called Quartodecimanism a heresy.

The rejection of Bishop Anicetus' position on the quartodeciman by Polycarp, and later Polycrates' letter to Pope Victor I, has been used by Orthodox theologians as proof against the argument that the Churches in Asia Minor accepted the Primacy of the Bishop of Rome and the teaching of Papal supremacy.

Jehovah's Witnesses and Bible Students celebrate the Memorial of Christ's death on Nisan 14, as it begins at sunset, while the Living Church of God keeps the quartodeciman Passover on the evening beginning Nisan 14.

Table of (Gregorian) dates of Easter 2015–2030
| Year | Full Moon | Jewish Passover (Note: Jewish Passover is on Nisan 15 of its calendar. It commences at sunset preceding the date indicated (as does Easter by some traditions).) | Astronomical Easter (Note: Astronomical Easter is the first Sunday after the astronomical full moon after the astronomical March equinox as measured at the meridian of Jerusalem according to the WCC proposal.) | Gregorian Easter | Julian Easter |
|---|---|---|---|---|---|
| 2015 | April 4 | | April 5 | | April 12 |
| 2016 | March 23 | April 23 | March 27 | | May 1 |
| 2017 | April 11 | | April 16 | | |
| 2018 | March 31 | | April 1 | | April 8 |
| 2019 | March 20 | April 20 | March 24 | April 21 | April 28 |
| 2020 | April 8 | April 9 | April 12 | | April 19 |
| 2021 | March 28 | | April 4 | | May 2 |
| 2022 | April 16 | | April 17 | | April 24 |
| 2023 | April 6 | | April 9 | | April 16 |
| 2024 | March 25 | April 23 | March 31 | | May 5 |
| 2025 | April 13 | | April 20 | | |
| 2026 | April 3 | April 2 | April 5 | | April 12 |
| 2027 | March 22 | April 22 | March 28 | | May 2 |
| 2028 | April 9 | April 11 | April 16 | | |
| 2029 | March 29 | March 31 | April 1 | | April 8 |
| 2030 | April 17 | April 18 | April 21 | | April 28 |

== See also ==
- Anti-Judaism
- Celtic Christianity
- Celtic Rite
- Christian Torah-submission
- Christian views on the Old Covenant
- Easter controversy
- Expounding of the Law
- New Covenant
- Paschal mystery
- Peri Pascha
- Supersessionism
