= Dios (philosopher) =

Dios was an ancient Greek philosopher of uncertain date. Certain Pythagorean writings on aesthetics are ascribed to him. Two fragments found in Stobaeus under the title On Beauty (Περὶ καλλονῆς) are written in an artificial Doric Greek (pseudo-Doric), which was popular among pseudonymous Pythagorean authors. Dios's style is perhaps the most archaizing in the Pythagorean corpus. The fragments in Stobaeus come to some thirty lines of prose. They concern "the physical beauty of young men as a source of [eudaimonia]". Philosophically, the excerpt is not noticeably Pythagorean.

Given the artificiality of its language, the fragments attributed to Dios are "obviously ... unreliable". Possibly, the pseudonym Dios was intended to evoke the father of Hesiod, who lived in the 7th century BC. The writings, however, are much later, perhaps as late as the Hellenistic period. According to Hellanikos of Lesbos, Dios the father of Hesiod was descended from Orpheus. Dios (also called Endios or Odios) is among the Pythagoreans mentioned in Iamblichus' Vita Pythagorica (who probably derived his information from Aristoxenus).

A wise saying in a Coptic collection is attributed to a certain Dios, described as a student of the legendary Linos of Thrace. He should probably be identified with the obscure Pythagorean. The saying is found in the Vienna parchment fragment K944, copied at the White Monastery in the 10th or 11th century AD. It states simply, "Diligence (μελετή) is everything."
