= Theophilus, bishop of Caesarea =

Bishop of Caesarea (died 196)

Saint Theophilus (Greek: Θεόφιλος; died c.196) was a bishop of Caesarea Maritima and teacher of Clement of Alexandria. Eusebius says Theophilus was well known.

Along with Narcissus of Jerusalem, he presided over the Synod of Caesarea which discussed the Paschal controversy. He is known for his opposition to the Quartodecimans. He also endorsed celebrating Christmas on 25 December.

He is commemorated on 5 March and his name means "Love of The God".

== See also ==
- Clement of Alexandria

Preceded by Cornelius (possibly Cornelius the Centurion)	Bishop of Caesarea c. 189	Succeeded by Theoctistus
