= Papirius of Smyrna =

Bishop of Smyrna

Papirius of Smyrna (2nd century) was the successor of Polycarp as the bishop of Smyrna. Little information is known about him. He was mentioned by Polycrates of Ephesus, as Papirius defended quartodecimanism against keeping Easter on the Sunday after 14 Nisan. At the end of his life, Papirius experienced martyrdom.
