= Polycrates of Ephesus =

2nd century bishop of Ephesus

Polycrates of Ephesus (/pəˈlɪkrəˌtiːz/; Greek: Πολυκράτης; fl. c. 130 – 196) was an Early Christian bishop at Ephesus. Polycrates convened a synod to establish Quartodecimanism as the official position on Easter for Asia. Composition of his letter has been dated to between AD 186 and 195.

The fragments of his letter to Pope Victor concerning Quartodecimanism provide a few details of his life. Polycrates came from a family at the center of the Christian community at Ephesus: he relates that seven of his relatives were bishops of the church in Ephesus, and he was the eighth. He also mentions that at the time he writes his letter to Victor, Polycrates had been "in the service of the Lord 65 years". Victor was inclined to excommunicate the churches of Asia, but a number of bishops advised him not to do this, including Irenaeus, pointing out that this was an ancient and unbroken tradition handed down to them from such important Christian figures as the apostles Philip and John. Victor eventually agreed to keep peace amongst the communities and not to excommunicate the churches of Asia.

== Quartodeciman controversy ==
When Pope Victor wanted to set an official practice of Easter on the whole Christian world, to celebrate Easter on Sunday, Polycrates writing in the name of the entire Asian church, argued that the apostles taught to celebrate the Passover (Holy Communion) on the 14th day of Nisan. In his letter, he appeals to the authority of Polycarp of Smyrna, Thraseas of Eumenia, Sagaris, Papirius and Melito, all of whom were Quartodecimans.

Despite Polycrates convening a synod in Ephesus to declare Quartodecimanism official, this observance eventually died out. By the time of the First Council of Nicaea, Easter was agreed to be celebrated on a Sunday.
