= Pseudo-Melitus =

Pseudo-Melito is the designation used for the anonymous authors of texts falsely or erroneously attributed to Melito of Sardis. Among the works attributed include "The Passion of John", an account found only in Latin which is grouped among the Acts of John. The author of a Latin account of the Assumption of Mary also identifies themself as Melito.
