= Pseudo-Evodius =

Coptic homilist (fl. 6th–8th century)

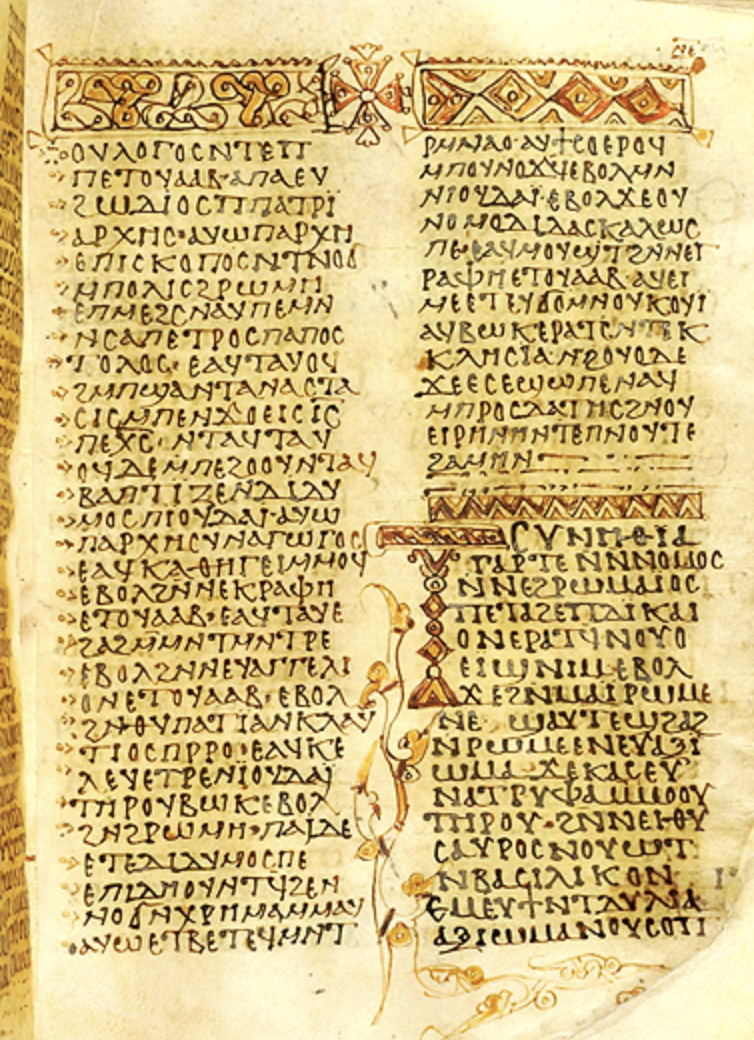
The start of the Coptic Homily on the Passion and Resurrection in M.595, attributed to Evodius of Rome

Pseudo-Evodius is the author of three Coptic language Christian works that were probably created at some point in the 6th–8th centuries. The author pseudepigraphically identifies himself as Evodius of Rome and "successor of Peter", which is almost certainly a reference to the 1st-century bishop Evodius. Not very much remains of early records of Evodius, but older sources generally placed him as Bishop of Antioch, not Rome. It is not known whether the author made a mistake and thought that Evodius succeeded Peter in Rome rather than Antioch, or intentionally moved him as part of an appeal to Roman authority, or if a genuine Egyptian Christian tradition existed that directly claimed Evodius went to Rome at some point.

The three works of New Testament apocrypha are all homilies. They have been given titles by later scholars as the Homily on the Dormition of the Virgin, Homily on the Passion and Resurrection, and Homily on the Life of Jesus and His Love for the Apostles. They are "apostolic memoirs", a genre that flourished in Egyptian Christianity.

== Authorship and date ==
The surviving manuscripts of Pseudo-Evodius are written in the Coptic language, the probable original language and the language of most Egyptian Christians in the era. They appear to be written in the 6th, 7th, or 8th centuries. Similarities in theme and their writing style suggest the same author behind all three, not separate authors attributing their work to Evodius. Very little is known of the original bishop Evodius, nor of Egyptian beliefs (if any) on him; he may have merely been a venerated person to emphasize the antiquity of the views within the homilies as going back to the Apostolic Age.

Tito Orlandi suggests a 7th century date after the Arab conquest of Egypt (639–642 CE), as he argues that the homilies include subtle anti-Islamic polemics made in response to it. Stephen Shoemaker suggests a 6th century date of around 550 CE on the grounds of the author seemingly being unaware of a Coptic tradition that the Virgin Mary's body remained on earth for 206 days before being taken up to heaven, and that this tradition became prominent in the 550–700 era, making such a later date less likely.

Almost nothing is known of Pseudo-Evodius. Within the framework of the story, Pseudo-Evodius cryptically says he is a foreigner to Palestine, yet "kin" to Jesus. The author uses quite a number of Greco-Coptic loanwords from Koine Greek; he also uses some Latin loanwords, a rarity in Coptic texts. Some of the advanced legal jargon used in the Homily on the Passion and Resurrection suggests he might have had some training in law. He also seems prone to ramble, self-consciously mentioning this, and goes on digressive rants at times in his works. The author might have been used to living in a monastic context, as the homilies routinely refer to the listening audience as "brothers" and Peter is referred to as apa ('father'), a common honorific title in monastic cultures.

== Homily on the Dormition of the Virgin ==
But our teacher, Jesus, said to us, 'Raise my mother's body upon a bier and crown it well with palms and fragrant branches. And sing before it the hymn that I taught you when I rose from the dead until [you reach] the place where I will order you to stop.' And when the Savior had said these things, he got on the chariot with his virgin mother, and the angels of God sang hymns before him until they reached heaven gloriously and honorably, while we were watching them.

— Homily on the Dormition of the Virgin 22

The Homily on the Dormition of the Virgin is a homily on the Dormition of the Virgin. A belief seen most commonly in Eastern Christianity was that when Mary, mother of God died, she did so via falling asleep and peacefully ascending into heaven. The homily gives an expansion of this story, although it moves Mary's death earlier compared to other accounts, sticking it shortly before the Ascension of Jesus during the period in which the Risen Jesus was on Earth. A chariot of light arrives attended by a multitude of angels; Mary's soul it put into the chariot; and Jesus personally drives the chariot into heaven. The apostles move Mary's body to the Valley of Josaphat, a traditional site identified with Mary's death in other stories. A crowd appears; angels later take Mary's body and fly it to heaven, too, and place it beneath the Tree of Life. The homily then concludes with the apostles declaring a feast day on which to celebrate Mary and her dormition, 21 Tobi.

There are at least eight manuscripts extant of the homily, which can be divided into three versions: a Sahidic Coptic version (likely the earliest of the surviving manuscripts), a Bohairic Coptic version, and a version in both Sahidic and Bohairic.

The middle section of the homily contains extended violent anti-Jewish polemics, including Jesus castigating "ignorant" and "lawless" Jews for their refusal to believe him, and an incident in the Bohairic version where a crowd of angry Jews attack the apostles and try to steal Mary's body, although these Jews eventually relent and convert after a miracle blinds them. Stephen Shoemaker, who wrote a comparative analysis of various versions of the Dormition legend, writes that "for its sheer quantity of anti‐Jewish invective, the St. Michael homily stands apart as among the most particularly anti‐Jewish of the ancient Dormition traditions."

== Homily on the Passion and Resurrection ==
Whenever the gentile or the Jew tells me "the God Jesus did not rise", I myself reprove his stupidity thus: You godless one, "truly are the sight of the eyes trusted more than the hearing of the ears," as the wise Paul once said.

— Homily on the Passion and Resurrection 3

The Homily on the Passion and Resurrection is an apocryphon on the trial, death, and resurrection of Jesus. It is set during the reign of Emperor Claudius, and more specifically set during Claudius' expulsion of Jews from Rome, an event whose details are unclear which lead to various interpretations of it in literature. Evodius identifies himself as "Archbishop of Rome" in the story he recounts, which emphasizes the innocence of the Romans in the death of Jesus and the crimes of the Jews. It is loosely reminiscent of the Acts of Pilate, better known in the form it reached in the Gospel of Nicodemus.

Evodius introduces himself and describes the occasion: an Easter service that includes the baptism of a Jew named Didymus. He mentions the "Alexander romance" (the belief that Alexander the Great visited the Jewish Second Temple to pay obesiance to the God of Abraham) but quickly veers into an anti-Jewish polemic, citing the Massacre of the Innocents, one of the Sibylline Oracles, and the cult of Astarte as evidence. In the homily's version of the Passion of Jesus, the Sanhedrin beat Jesus while procurator Pontius Pilate treats him respectfully and attempts to arrange his release. While Pilate suggests the thief Barabbas be crucified in Jesus's stead, he eventually goes along with the Sanhedrin's demand to order the crucifixion of Jesus. The text also veers into a defense of apocrypha and other non-canonical works as useful and important due to the gospels not covering every detail, a somewhat metatextual defense of the work as useful despite not being one of the canonical gospels.

Mystical explanations of the different times of day on Good Friday and how they relate to Jesus's suffering and earlier biblical prefigurings are given. A backstory is given of both the evil thief and good thief, Demas and Kestes in this version, who were crucified with Jesus. The centurion who witnesses Jesus's death converts to Christianity on the spot. Evodius seems to imply he tried to take the body of Jesus himself, but was prevented by hostile Jews. Instead, Joseph of Arimathea takes the body and buries it, in text loosely based on the Matthew 27.

The narrative shifts to the third person and says that Evodius's sermon recounted so far has whipped the Roman Christians into a frenzy, eager for vengeance upon the guilty Jews. Evodius holds the crowd back saying that the story is not finished. Exactly three days later, Mary Magdalene and other women arrive and find Jesus's tomb empty, with guards asleep and an archangel waiting for them. Mary tells the other disciples, and Jesus appears to Mary, then Evodius himself, then the other disciples. The sermon then calls for compassion and bodily discipline.

There are seven manuscripts of the homily extant. Only one is complete: M.595, a parchment manuscript held by the Morgan Library & Museum, created in the 9th century. It was part of a cache of Coptic manuscripts found in 1910 at the ruins of the Monastery of Saint Michael in Hamouli, Egypt and acquired for J. P. Morgan in 1911. The other six manuscripts preserve only fragments of the text, with the earliest dating to the 8th century.

Similar to the Homily on the Dormition of the Virgin, the work is virulently anti-Jewish, with fierce attacks on the Jews in every page as if it was a legal suit against them. It also emphasizes that the Romans are "philanthropists" who "establish justice at all times." The work makes clear that Pontius Pilate was a good proto-Christian who was essentially innocent, and the Jews were guilty in the death of Jesus. If the homily really was written after the Arab conquest of Egypt, then it is possible this was a coded message of unity between Chalcedonian Christianity favored by Byzantine Greeks (still of the "Roman" Empire) and Miaphysite Christianity favored by many Egyptians, that they should work together against their true enemy in the non-Christian Jews and Muslims.

== Homily on the Life of Jesus and His Love for the Apostles ==
Saint John went to the devil. He said to him, "What are you doing with these nets and what do you catch in this place?" The devil replied, "I heard it is said about you and your brothers that you are fishers, men who catch fish. I came here to see your master today. Here I am in this place—me, my servants, and my nets. Call your brothers too, so that they join you here with their nets, and let us cast them in this place. The one who can catch fish in this place is the master. It is no miracle to catch fish in the water. The miracle is to catch them in the desert."

— Homily on the Life of Jesus and His Love for the Apostles 59–60

The Homily on the Life of Jesus and His Love for the Apostles, also called Homily on the Passion and Resurrection 2, is another homily on the topic of Jesus's actions and life. No single manuscript contains it in its entirety; it has been reconstructed in eclectic style drawing from fragments in three incomplete manuscripts. The manuscripts are originally from the White Monastery in Egypt, but were since further split into pages and divided among various holders. Evodius's name is never mentioned in the surviving fragments, but the introduction to the work is incomplete, suggesting that a missing section is where the author probably identified themself. The work shares thematic parallels, verbatim expressions, prominence given to Peter, and shared rare words with the other two homilies that Pseudo-Evodius wrote, hence it being included as part of his works.

It begins with an introduction by the homilist and then a series of questions by Thomas the Apostle ("Doubting Thomas") on the nature of the resurrection as well as Jesus's other activities, such as the multiplication of the loaves and fishes and the resurrection of Lazarus. Roman officials attempt to crown Jesus as king of Judea, to both Herod and Jesus's frustration. Even Pontius Pilate is said to already be a supporter of Jesus, considering him King of the Jews (presumably a reference to John 19:19). The homily then expands on an episode loosely derived from Matthew 16 describing Jesus in the wilderness. Jesus retreats to the desert and praises Peter as the first among the apostles. The devil, having failed to get Jesus to accept an earthly crown, challenges John, the disciples, and Jesus to a fishing contest in the desert, accompanied by his own fishing demons. Jesus naturally wins. Humiliated, the devil runs away after John throws a stone at him. Bartholomew the Apostle requests to see the devil, but the surviving manuscript breaks off here, leaving the rest of the content unknown.

Timothy Pettipiece argues that the earliest section shows some connection with the Questions of Bartholomew, Book of Bartholomew, and Gospel of Nicodemus in structure and style, in particular its depiction of Lazarus in the underworld seemingly echoing traditions of the Harrowing of Hell. If the author really was living in an Egyptian monastery, which were usually situated away from crowded river cities and in the desert, it is possible that the fishing tournament was metaphorical for God and the Devil fishing for the monks themselves in the desert. This would make it a reference to the "fishers of men" line from the gospels. John throwing a stone at the devil is a motif seen in the Stoning of the Devil in the Islamic hajj, although the nature of any connection is difficult to hypothesize.
