= Pope Victor I =

Head of the Catholic Church from c. 189 to 199

Pope Saint Victor I
- Bishop of Rome
- Church: Catholic Church
- Papacy began: 189
- Papacy ended: 199
- Predecessor: Eleutherius
- Successor: Zephyrinus

Personal details
- Born: Roman Africa, Roman Empire (Leptis Magna)
- Died: 199 Rome, Italy, Roman Empire

Sainthood
- Feast day: 28 July or 11 January

Pope Victor I (died 199) was a Roman African prelate of the Catholic Church who served as the Bishop of Rome in the late second century. The dates of his tenure are uncertain, but one source states he became pope in 189 and gives the year of his death as 199. He was born in the Roman Province of Africa. He was later considered a saint. His feast day is celebrated on 28 July as that of "St Victor I, Pope and Martyr". He was of Berber origin.

== Biography ==
The primary sources vary over the dates assigned to Victor's episcopate, but indicate it included the last decade of the second century. Eusebius puts his accession in the tenth year of Commodus (i.e. AD 189), which is accepted by Lipsius as the correct date. Jerome's version of the Chronicle puts his accession in the reign of Pertinax, or the first year of Septimius Severus (i.e. 193), while the Armenian version puts it in the seventh year of Commodus (186). The Liber Pontificalis dates his accession to the consulate of Commodus and Glabrio (i.e. 186), while the Liberian Catalogue, a surviving copy of the source the Liber Pontificalis drew upon for its chronology, is damaged at this point.

Concerning the duration of his episcopate, Eusebius, in his Ecclesiastical History, does not state directly the duration of his episcopate, but the Armenian version of Eusebius' Chronicle gives it as 12 years. The Liberian Catalogue gives his episcopate a length of nine years two months and ten days, while the Liber Pontificalis states it was ten years and the same number of months and days; the Felician Catalogue something over ten. Finally, Eusebius in his History (5.28) states Zephyrinus succeeded him "about the ninth year of Severus", (201), while the Liber Pontificalis dates it to the consulate of Laternus and Rufinus (197). Lipsius, considering Victor in connection with his successors, concludes that he held office between nine and ten years, and therefore gives as his dates 189–198 or 199.

According to an anonymous writer quoted by Eusebius, Victor excommunicated Theodotus of Byzantium for teaching that Christ was a mere man. However, he is best known for his role in the Quartodeciman controversy. Prior to his elevation, a difference in dating the celebration of the Christian Passover/Easter between Rome and the bishops of Asia Minor had been tolerated by both the Roman and Eastern churches.

The churches in Asia Minor celebrated Easter on the 14th of the Jewish month of Nisan, the day before Jewish Passover, regardless of what day of the week it fell on, as the Crucifixion had occurred on the Friday before Passover, justifying this as the custom they had learned from the apostles; for this the Latins called them Quartodecimans. Synods were held on the subject in various parts—in Judea under Theophilus of Caesarea and Narcissus of Jerusalem, in Pontus under Palmas, in Gaul under Irenaeus, in Corinth under its bishop, Bachillus, at Osrhoene in Mesopotamia, and elsewhere—all of which disapproved of this practice and consequently issued by synodical letters declaring that "on the Lord's Day only the mystery of the resurrection of the Lord from the dead was accomplished, and that on that day only we keep the close of the paschal fast" (Eusebius H. E. v. 23).

Despite this disapproval, the general feeling was that this divergent tradition was not sufficient grounds for excommunication. Victor alone was intolerant of this difference, and severed ties with these ancient churches, whose bishops included Polycrates of Ephesus; in response he was rebuked by Irenaeus and others, according to Eusebius.

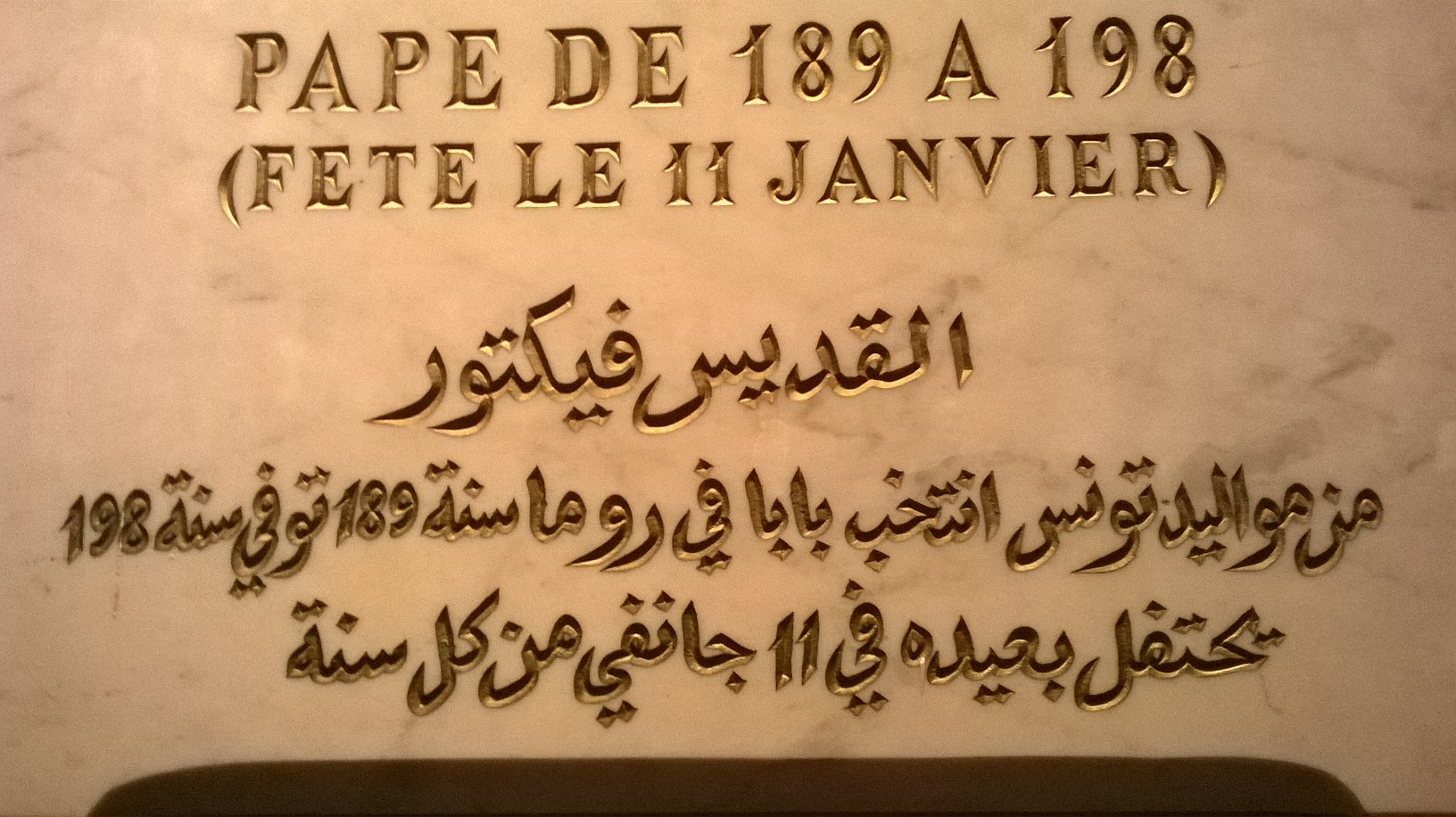
Bilingual plaque in the Cathedral of Saint Vincent de Paul, Tunis, commemorating Victor I.

== See also ==
- List of Catholic saints
- List of popes

== Literature ==
- Josef Rist. "VICTOR I.". Biographisch-Bibliographisches Kirchenlexikon (BBKL) (in German).
- Handl A. (2016). Viktor I. (189?-199?) von Rom und die Etablierung des "monarchischen" Episkopats in Rom. Sacris Erudiri: a Journal on the Inheritance of Early and Medieval Christianity, 55, 7-56.

Titles of the Great Christian Church
Preceded by Eleuterus	Bishop of Rome; 189–199	Succeeded by Zephyrinus
