= Aleppo Easter dating method =

Proposal for reforming the date of Easter

The World Council of Churches proposed a reform of the method of determining the date of Easter at a summit in Aleppo, Syria, in March 1997.

== Calculations ==
Under the proposal, Easter would be defined as the first Sunday following the first astronomical full moon following the astronomical vernal equinox, as determined from the meridian of Jerusalem. The phrase "the first full moon after the equinox" is taken exactly: they each are instantaneous astronomical events; if the full moon occurs after the equinox, it is the paschal full moon, even if they occur on the same day. An example would be the full moon at 04:26 Jerusalem time (UTC+02:21) on 21 March 2019, after the equinox at 00:41 Jerusalem time the same day.

The reform would have been implemented starting in 2001, the first year in which the eastern and western dates of Easter would coincide after this method was proposed in 1997. While for eastern Christians, the date of Easter would change roughly 70% of the time, assuming a start date of 2001, the first difference for western Christians would have been in 2019, where the Aleppo method gives 24 March (as opposed to 21 April under the Gregorian method). However, if one begins calculations in 1997, there is a difference in the following year: the Aleppo method gives Easter Sunday as 19 April 1998; in this case western Christians (who celebrated on 12 April that year) would have had to change their date while eastern Christians would not, a phenomenon which would also apply in 2049, 2106, 2143, 2147, 2150, 2174, 2201 etc. This effectively means that a change to the Aleppo rules would have brought slightly fewer changes for Orthodox churches than adopting the Gregorian method.

The proposal has the effect of slightly widening the range of dates on which Easter could be celebrated. While the current extremes are 22 March and 25 April, the range would widen by one date on each side. These new dates, however, would be extremely uncommon: commencing calculations from 1997, the first occurrence of Easter on 26 April would be in 2201 (a year in which under the Gregorian method Easter falls on 19 April), while the first occurrence of Easter on 21 March would not be until the year 2877 (a year in which under the Gregorian method Easter falls on 25 April). The Aleppo method would make it possible for Candlemas and Shrove Tuesday to coincide, as Ash Wednesday would fall on 3 February if Easter fell on 21 March in a common year; and also for Lætare Sunday to occur in the month of February, which is not currently possible, as an Easter of 21 March would position Laetare Sunday on 28 February (or on 29 February if the 21 March Easter is occurring in a leap year). A 21 March Easter in a common year would also make a January date for Shrove Sunday; and a 26 April Easter in any year would make a March date for Sexagesima Sunday.

In the 21st and 22nd centuries, it is the years in which the paschal full moon on the Gregorian tables falls on its latest possible date (18 April) — the year 2019 and every nineteenth year after that — when the Aleppo method gives Easter approximately a month earlier than the Gregorian. The gradually accumulating gap between the Gregorian algorithms and the astronomical equinox and full moon means that in these years, the true full moon in March occurs just after the equinox; while the equivalent full moon in the Gregorian algorithm falls on 20 March (the approximated equinox), meaning that the paschal full moon is delayed until the following month. In the year 2000, however, this is not the case. One might think, based on the occurrences in 2019 and every nineteenth year after that, that the Aleppo method would give 26 March as Easter Sunday for 2000. However, the gap between the Gregorian algorithms and the astronomical equinox and full moon had not yet widened enough to place the true March full moon after the equinox; in 2000, a full moon occurred at 06:55 Jerusalem time on 20 March, before the March equinox at 09:56 Jerusalem time the same day; as a result, the paschal full moon was not until the following month (as it is defined as the first full moon after the equinox), and the date given for Easter 2000 by the Aleppo method was therefore 23 April, the same as by the Gregorian method.

In the year 2045, astronomical Easter will be on 2 April, that is one week earlier than both current methods calculate, but it would also coincide with Jewish Passover. This is a case previous reformers tried to avoid – Easter should always come after Passover.

== Acceptance ==
The proposal is not without controversy. Some Orthodox Christians tend not to look favorably upon the roughly one-in-five occurrence of Easter on or before the first day of Passover in the Aleppo method because, if Easter is not the Sunday after Passover, there is a conflict with the Gospels (despite the Orthodox practice often not having Easter on the Sunday after the first day of Passover in the majority of years when there is more than seven days' difference between the first day of Passover and Easter Sunday), though others note it was the intention of the Nicene formula to separate the date of the Christian feast of Easter from the date for the Jewish feast of Passover.

Table of (Gregorian) dates of Easter 2001–2025
| Year | Full Moon | Jewish Passover (Note: Jewish Passover is on Nisan 15 of its calendar. It commences at sunset preceding the date indicated (as does Easter by some traditions).) | Astronomical Easter (Note: Astronomical Easter is the first Sunday after the astronomical full moon after the astronomical March equinox as measured at the meridian of Jerusalem according to the WCC proposal.) | Gregorian Easter | Julian Easter |
|---|---|---|---|---|---|
| 2001 | 8 April | | 15 April | | |
| 2002 | 28 March | | 31 March | | 5 May |
| 2003 | 16 April | 17 April | 20 April | | 27 April |
| 2004 | 5 April | 6 April | 11 April | | |
| 2005 | 25 March | 24 April | 27 March | | 1 May |
| 2006 | 13 April | | 16 April | | 23 April |
| 2007 | 2 April | 3 April | 8 April | | |
| 2008 | 21 March | 20 April | 23 March | | 27 April |
| 2009 | 9 April | | 12 April | | 19 April |
| 2010 | 30 March | | 4 April | | |
| 2011 | 18 April | 19 April | 24 April | | |
| 2012 | 6 April | 7 April | 8 April | | 15 April |
| 2013 | 27 March | 26 March | 31 March | | 5 May |
| 2014 | 15 April | | 20 April | | |
| 2015 | 4 April | | 5 April | | 12 April |
| 2016 | 23 March | 23 April | 27 March | | 1 May |
| 2017 | 11 April | | 16 April | | |
| 2018 | 31 March | | 1 April | | 8 April |
| 2019 | 20 March | 20 April | 24 March | 21 April | 28 April |
| 2020 | 8 April | 9 April | 12 April | | 19 April |
| 2021 | 28 March | | 4 April | | 2 May |
| 2022 | 16 April | | 17 April | | 24 April |
| 2023 | 6 April | | 9 April | | 16 April |
| 2024 | 25 March | 23 April | 31 March | | 5 May |
| 2025 | 13 April | | 20 April | | |

== Implementation ==
This reform has not been implemented. It would have relied mainly on the co-operation of the Eastern Orthodox Church, since the date of Easter would change for them immediately; whereas for the western churches, the new system would not differ from that currently in use until 2019 (again, assuming a start date of 2001; and not taking into account the aforementioned situation in 1998 should calculations begin from the proposal of the method in 1997). Though Roman Catholic, Eastern Orthodox, and Lutheran leaders have responded positively to the proposal over the years, the reform has yet to be adopted.
