= Sagar of Laodicea =

Greek bishop and saint (died 175)

Saint Sagar

Martyr and Bishop of Laodicea
- Died: 175
- Venerated in: Roman Catholic Church, Eastern Orthodox Church
- Canonized: pre-congregation
- Feast: 6 October

Saint Sagar or Sagaris was a martyr of the early Christian church. He was supposedly a disciple of St. Paul; it is known that he was Bishop of Laodicea, Phrygia. He suffered martyrdom during the reign of Emperor Marcus Aurelius. Sagar was quoted by Polycrates because he was a quartodeciman.

His feast day is 6 October.
