= Prophets in Christianity =

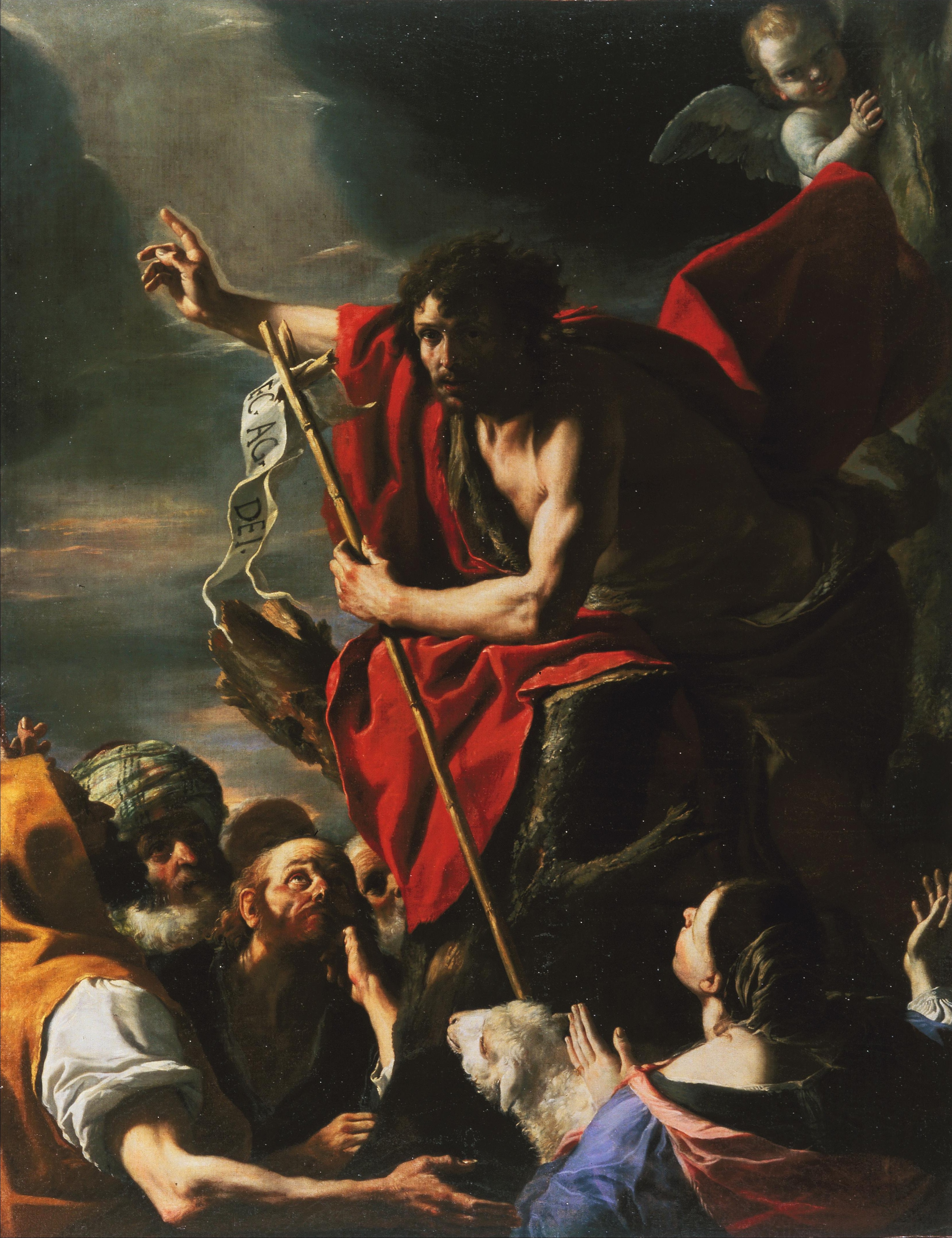
St. John the Baptist Preaching, c. 1665, by Mattia Preti

In Christianity, a prophet is a person whom Christians believe is chosen and called by the one God as a messenger. Many prophets, including ones to come in the future, are mentioned in the Old Testament and New Testament of the Christian Bible, and numerous people throughout history have claimed to be prophets, though none are accepted as such by mainstream denominations.

The first list below consists of only those individuals that have been clearly defined as prophets, either by explicit statement or strong contextual implication (e.g. the purported authors of the books listed as the major prophets and minor prophets) along with the biblical reference to their office. The second list consists of those individuals who are recorded as having had a visionary or prophetic experience, but without a history of any major or consistent prophetic calling. The third list contains the names of those described in the Bible as prophets, but who are presented as either misusing this gift or as fraudulent. The final list consists of post-biblical individuals regarded as prophets and of post-biblical individuals who are claimed to have had visionary or prophetic experience.

== Main list ==
Name	Book	Chapter/Verse
Adam	Genesis	2:19–23
Lamech, father of Noah	Genesis	5:28–29
Noah	Genesis	7:1
Melchizedek	Genesis	14:18–24
Ishmael	Genesis	16:11
Lot	Genesis	19:11–14
Abraham	Genesis	20:7
Isaac	Genesis	26:2–7
Jacob	Genesis	28:11–16
Joseph	Genesis	37:5–11
Jethro	Exodus	2:18
Aaron	Exodus	7:1
Miriam	Exodus	15:20
Moses	Deuteronomy	34:10
Joshua	Joshua	1:1
Deborah	Judges	4:4
Gideon	Judges	6–8
Samuel	1 Samuel	3:20
Gad	1 Samuel	22:5
Nathan	2 Samuel	7:2
Ahijah	1 Kings	11:29
Shemaiah	1 Kings	12:22
Jehu	1 Kings	16:7
Elijah	1 Kings	18:36
Micaiah	1 Kings	22:9
Elisha	2 Kings	9:1
Isaiah	2 Kings	19:2
Huldah	2 Kings	22:14
Iddo	2 Chronicles	13:22
Azariah	2 Chronicles	15:1–8
Oded, father of Azariah	2 Chronicles	15:8
Hanani	2 Chronicles	16:7
Zechariah, son of Jehoiada	2 Chronicles	24:20
Oded	2 Chronicles	28:9
Asaph	2 Chronicles	29:30
Job	Job	1:1
Jeremiah	Jeremiah	20:2
Urijah	Jeremiah	26:20
Ezekiel	Ezekiel	1:3
Hosea	Hosea	1:1
Joel	Joel, Acts	1:1, Acts 2:16
Amos	Amos	1:1
Obadiah	Obadiah	1:1
Jonah	Jonah, 2 Kings	1:1, 2 Kings 14:25
Micah	Micah	1:1
Nahum	Nahum	1:1
Habakkuk	Habakkuk	1:1
Zephaniah	Zephaniah	1:1
Haggai	Haggai	1:1
Zechariah, son of Berechiah	Zechariah	1:1
Malachi	Malachi	1:1
Daniel	Matthew	24:15
Anna	Luke	2:36–38
John the Baptist	Luke	7:28
Philip the Evangelist	Acts	8:26
Paul the Apostle	Acts	9:20
Agabus	Acts	11:27–28
Simeon Niger	Acts	13:1
Lucius of Cyrene	Acts	13:1
Manahen	Acts	13:1
Judas Barsabbas	Acts	15:32
Phillip's daughters	Acts	21:8, 21:9
Silas	Acts	15:32
David	Hebrews	11:32
Enoch	Jude	1:14
John of Patmos	Revelation	1:1–3

=== Unnamed prophets ===
Name	Book	Chapter/Verse
A prophet	Judges	6:8–10
A man of God from Judah	1 Kings	13:1
An old prophet from Bethel	1 Kings	13:11
A prophet	1 Kings	20:13, 22
A prophet	2 Chronicles	25:15–16
Two witnesses	Revelation	11:3

== Biblical people with claimed prophetic experiences ==
Name	Book	Chapter/Verse
Eldad	Numbers	11:26
Medad	Numbers	11:26
Saul, the first king to unite Israel	1 Samuel	10:10
Solomon	1 Kings	3:5
Eliezer	2 Chronicles	20:37
Jahaziel	2 Chronicles	20:14
Elihu	Job	32–35
King Nebuchadnezzar of Babylon	Daniel	2:1
Joseph, legal father of Jesus	Matthew	1:20
Mary, mother of Jesus, mother of John the Baptist	Luke	1:26–28
Elisabeth, mother of John the Baptist	Luke	1:41
Zechariah, father of John the Baptist	Luke	1:67
Joachim	Luke	3:23
Simeon of Jerusalem	Luke	2:25, 26
Ananias of Damascus	Acts	9:10–18

=== Men of God ===
Name	Book	Chapter/Verse
The seventy elders of Israel	Numbers	11:25
A man of God	1 Samuel	2:27–36
A man of God	1 Kings	20:28
One of the sons of the prophets	1 Kings	20:35–42
A man of God	2 Chronicles	25:7–9

== False prophets and prophets of Baal ==
Name	Book	Chapter/Verse
The false prophets of Baal	1 Kings	18:13–40
Zedekiah, son of Chenaanah	1 Kings	22:24
Shemaiah son of Delaiah	Jeremiah	6:10
Noadiah	Jeremiah	6:14
Hananiah	Jeremiah	28:5
Ahab, son of Kolaiah	Jeremiah	29:21–23
Zedekiah, son of Maaseiah	Jeremiah	29:21
Shemaiah the Nehelamite	Jeremiah	29:24
Simon Magus	Acts	8:9–24
Elymas (a.k.a. Bar-Jesus)	Acts	13:6–12
Antichrists	1 John	2:18–19
Jezebel (not to be confused with the Jezebel of the Old Testament)	Revelation	2:20
The false prophet	Revelation	16:13, 19:20, 20:10

== Claimed post-biblical prophets ==
The following persons are considered by some Christians to be prophets, or to have had prophetic experiences.

Name	Time Period	Description
Ammia of Philadelphia	fl. late 1st – early 2nd century AD	
Quadratus of Athens	2nd century	sometimes considered one of the seventy apostles
Montanus, Prisca, and Maximilla	2nd century	founders of Montanism
Quintilla	3rd century	founder of an offshoot movement from Montanism
Iarlaithe mac Loga	6th century	founder of the School of Tuam
Merlin	6th century	likely invented by Geoffrey of Monmouth from older legends, first appears in the Prophetiae Merlini
Palladius of Embrun	6th century	Bishop of Embrun
Columba	521–597	credited with spreading Christianity in Scotland
Saint Malachy	1094–1148	Archbishop of Armagh and author of the Prophecy of the Popes
James Salomoni	1231–1314	
Joan of Arc	1412–1431	
Nostradamus	1503–1566	
Justus Velsius	1510–1571	Dutch faith healer who debated against John Calvin
Eleanor Davies	1590–1652	
Ann Bathurst	17th century	member of the Philadelphians
Martha Hatfield	17th century	Puritan
John Bull and Richard Farnham	17th century	claimed to be the two witnesses of the Book of Revelation
Margareta i Kumla	17th century	claimed to have seen angels and demons fight over her soul
John Robins	17th century	Ranter rescued from Roundhead recourse by recanting his revelations
Anne Wentworth	17th century	persecuted by Baptists
John Reeve	1608–1658	co-founder of Muggletonianism
Lodowicke Muggleton	1609–1698	co-founder of Muggletonianism
Mary Cary	1621–1653	supporter of the Fifth Monarchists
Eva Margareta Frölich	1650–1692	Millennialist, pietist author and critic of the Church of Sweden
Emanuel Swedenborg	1688–1772	founder of Swedenborgianism
Joanna Southcott	1750–1814	author of prophecies kept in a box to be opened in times of national crisis, claimed judgement day would happen in 2004
Public Universal Friend	1752–1819	preacher who claimed to have died and been reborn without gender
George Rapp	1757–1847	founder of the Harmony Society
John Ward	1781–1837	claimed successor of Joanna Southcott
William Miller	1782–1849	founder of Adventism
John Wroe	1782–1863	founder of the Christian Israelite Church
Bernhard Müller	1788–1834	founder of an offshoot from the Harmony Society, that would later start the Germantown Colony
Helena Ekblom	1790–1859	Swedish preacher who was put in an asylum for refusing to comply with the Church of Sweden's doctrines
Joseph Smith	1805–1844	founder of the Latter Day Saint movement
Hong Xiuquan	1814–1864	founder of the Taiping Heavenly Kingdom
John Bosco	1815–1888	founder of the Salesians of Don Bosco
Mary Baker Eddy	1821–1910	founder of Christian Science
Ellen G. White	1827–1915	co-founder of the Seventh-day Adventist Church
John Alexander Dowie	1847–1907	founder of the Christ Community Church
Nona L. Brooks	1861–1945	founder of the Church of Divine Science
William Irvine	1863–1947	co-founder of the Two by Twos movement
Siener van Rensburg	1864–1926	advisor to Koos de la Rey, influenced the Suidlanders
E. W. Kenyon	1867–1948	possible line of transmission between the New Thought and Word of Faith movements
Helena Konttinen	1871–1916	a "sleeping preacher" who started a revivalist movement
Felix Manalo	1886–1963	founder of the Iglesia ni Cristo
Padre Pio	1887–1968	Catholic saint, purportedly predicted the papacy of John Paul II
William M. Branham	1909–1965	influence on televangelism
A. A. Allen	1911–1970	Pentecostal evangelist and faith healer
Kenneth Hagin	1917–2003	pioneer of the Word of Faith movement
Oral Roberts	1918–2009	considered the godfather of the charismatic movement, founder of the Oral Roberts Evangelistic Association and Oral Roberts University
T. L. Osborn	1923–2013	Pentecostal evangelist and musician
Pat Robertson	1930–2023	chairman of the Christian Broadcasting Network, host of The 700 Club, noted for controversial statements
David Wilkerson	1931–2011	author of The Cross and the Switchblade and founder of the Teen Challenge
Reverend Ike	1935–2009	noted for his slogan "You can't lose with the stuff I use!"
Kenneth Copeland	born 1936	televangelist, noted as an advocate of prosperity theology and for claiming to have ended the COVID-19 pandemic
Robert Tilton	born 1946	televangelist noted for his prosperity theology infomercials and questionable fundraising practices
Roch Thériault	1947–2011	founder of a polygamous doomsday cult called the Ant Hill Kids
John Paul Jackson	1950–2015	author noted for dream interpretation
Benny Hinn	born 1952	televangelist noted for faith healing and prosperity theology
David Koresh	1959–1993	leader of the Branch Davidians during the Waco siege
Creflo Dollar	born 1962	televangelist noted for prosperity theology
T. B. Joshua	1963–2021	televangelist and founder of Synagogue, Church of All Nations
Joshua Iginla	born 1969	televangelist, prosperity theology preacher, and megachurch pastor
Jeremiah Omoto Fufeyin	born 1972	founder of the Christ Mercyland Deliverance Ministry, criticized for flamboyant ministry
Daniel Obinim	born 1977	minister noted for controversial actions and statements

== See also ==
- Bible prophecy
- List of Book of Mormon prophets
- Old Testament messianic prophecies quoted in the New Testament
- Prophets in Judaism
- Prophets and messengers in Islam
- Table of prophets of Abrahamic religions
