= Apollonius of Ephesus =

Late 2nd/early 3rd century Greek eccelesiastical writer

Apollonius of Ephesus (Greek: Ἀπολλώνιος; fl. 180–210) was an anti-Montanist Greek ecclesiastical writer, probably from Asia Minor.

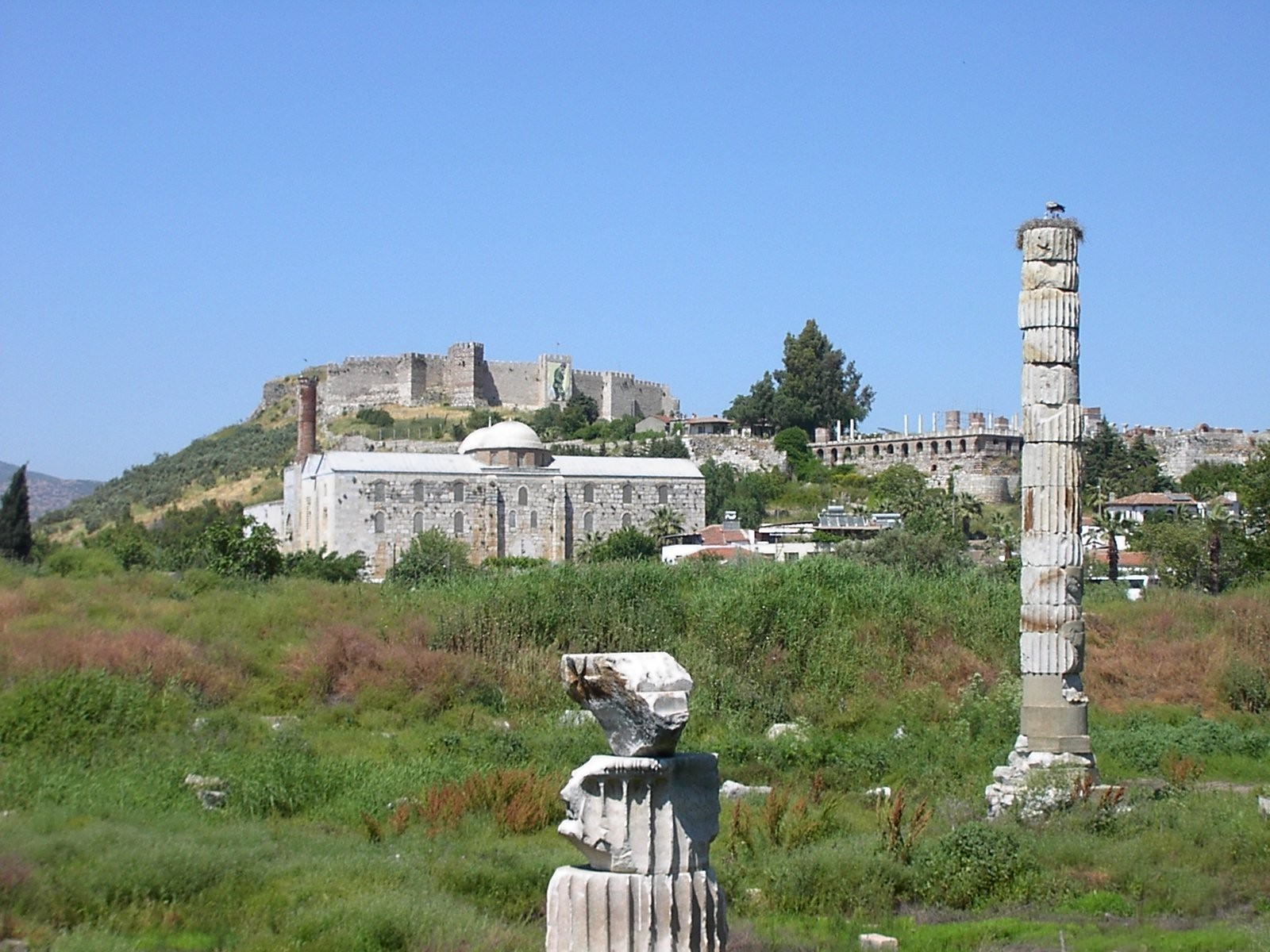
Site of the Temple of Artemis in Ephesus.

He was thoroughly acquainted with the Christian history of Ephesus and the doings of the Phrygian Montanists. The unknown author of Praedestinatus says he was a Bishop of Ephesus. However, the lack of support from other Christian writers makes this testimony doubtful. He undertook the defense of the Church against Montanus, and followed in the footsteps of Zoticus of Comanus, Julian of Apamaea, Sotas of Anchialus, and Apollinaris of Hierapolis.

His work is cited by Eusebius, and is praised by Jerome, but has been lost, and not even its title is known. It most likely argued the falsity of the Montanist prophecies and recounted the lives of Montanus and his prophets. It also gave currency to the report of their suicide by hanging, and threw light on some of the adepts of the sect, including the apostate Themison, and the pseudo-martyr Alexander.

Themison, having evaded martyrdom by means of money, posed as an innovator, addressing a letter to his partisans after the manner of the Apostles, and finally insulted Jesus and Christianity. Alexander, a notorious thief, publicly condemned at Ephesus, had himself adored as a god.

Based on Eusebius, it is known that Apollonius spoke in his work of Zoticus, who, along with Julian of Apamea, had tried to exorcise Maximilla, but had been prevented by Themison, and of the martyr-Bishop Thraseas, another adversary of Montanism. He likely gave the signal in it for the movement of opposition to Montanism which the reunion of the first synods developed.

At all events, he recalls the tradition according to which Jesus had advised the Apostles not to go far from Jerusalem during the twelve years immediately following his Ascension, a tradition known to Clement of Alexandria from the apocryphal Praedicatio Petri. Moreover, he recounts the restoration to life of a dead man at Ephesus by John the Apostle, whose Apocalypse he knew and quotes.

He takes rank among the opponents of Montanism with the "Anonymous" of Eusebius, with Miltiades and with Apollinaris. Eusebius says his work constituted "an abundant and excellent refutation of Montanism". St. Jerome qualified it as "a lengthy and remarkable volume". It did not therefore pass unnoticed, and roused some feeling among the Montanists since Tertullian felt it necessary to reply to it.

After his six books peri ekstaseos, in which he apologized for the ecstasies into which the Montanist prophets fell before prophesying, Tertullian composed a seventh especially to refute Apollonius; he wrote it also in Greek for the use of the Asiatic Montanists.
