= Ammia of Philadelphia =

Early Christian prophetess

- Born: 1st century CE (Note: Ammia's birth in the 1st century CE is deduced from her activity in the early to mid-2nd century CE, as she succeeded Quadratus (who flourished in the 120s CE) and preceded the Montanist movement (which began in the 160s CE). This timeline indicates she was already an established figure by the early 2nd century CE.)
- Occupation: Prophetess
- Years active: Late 1st century – early 2nd century CE

Ammia of Philadelphia (Note: /ˈæmiəəvfɪləˈdɛlfiə/ AMee-ə əv fil-ə-DEL-fee-ə; Ancient Greek: Ἀμμία ἡ προφῆτις ἐν Φιλαδελφείᾳ, Ammía hē prophêtis en Philadelphíā) (fl. late 1st–early 2nd century AD), also known as Ammia the Prophetess (Note: Derived from Ancient Greek: Ἀμμία ἡ προφῆτις), was an early Christian prophetess in the Christian community of Philadelphia, located in the Roman province of Asia (Alaşehir, Turkey).

She was one of the few women in the early church formally recognized as a prophetess, noted for her contributions to the prophetic tradition and her role in shaping early Christianity. Acknowledged by the historian Eusebius, she is regarded as a successor to the apostolic prophetic ministry, adhering to orthodox traditions and contributing to the foundation of the early Christian churches of Asia.

== Ministry ==
Ammia was a prophetess who was well-recognized in antiquity and referred to as "Ammia in Philadelphia" by Church historian Eusebius (4th century CE) in Ecclesiastical History, (Chapter XVII.—Miltiades and His Works). Catholic Answers mentions that "[she] must have belonged to the primitive Church of Philadelphia," linking her association with the early Christian community there. Eusebius listed her as part of a distinguished group of prophets, among Agabus, Judas Barsabbas, Silas, the daughters of Philip, and Quadratus, many of whom are referenced in the Book of Acts. Ammia was regarded as a successor to the prophetic tradition established by figures like Philip's daughters, New Testament prophetesses active in the 60s CE. While Philip's daughters were prominent in their time, Ammia later "succeeded them in fame," gaining reverence throughout Asia Minor.

Ammia was active in the church from the late 1st to early 2nd century CE, contributing significantly to the prophetic tradition during Christianity's formative years in Asia Minor. She flourished between approximately 100 and 160 CE, with her influence as a prophetess widely recognized in the first half of the 2nd century. Scholars such as Christine Trevett and W.M. Ramsay align her ministry with the period following Quadratus, who was active in the 120s CE, and suggest she may have been succeeded by the Montanist prophets in the 160s. Dr. Catherine Kroeger notes that the first preserved mention of Ammia dates to around 160 CE.

Ammia was acknowledged within the orthodox Christian tradition, which emphasized adherence to mainstream Christian beliefs. Additionally, this view was supported by Eusebius, whom he identifies her as one who "prophesied under the New Convenant". This recognition sets her apart from contemporaries like Priscilla and Maximilla, who were associated with Montanism, a movement later deemed heretical. Despite this distinction, the Montanists attempted to claim Ammia and Quadratus as predecessors in the prophetic gift. They sought to connect their movement to the established tradition of prophecy within the early church.

Ammia's prophetic practice was noted for its measured and composed approach. This contrasted sharply with the ecstatic and frenzied style of Montanist prophets, which Eusebius criticized as deviating from established traditions.

== Legacy ==
=== Late Antiquity account ===
Eusebius references Ammia as part of a lineage of distinguished prophets in early Christianity.

Eusebius quotes Miltiades, a contemporary critic of Montanus, who writes:

"They cannot show that one of the old or one of the new prophets was thus carried away in spirit. Neither can they boast of Agabus, or Judas, or Silas, or the daughters of Philip, or Ammia in Philadelphia, or Quadratus, or any others not belonging to them." "For if after Quadratus and Ammia in Philadelphia, as they assert, the women with Montanus received the prophetic gift, let them show who among them received it from Montanus and the women. For the apostle thought it necessary that the prophetic gift should continue in all the Church until the final coming. But they cannot show it, though this is the fourteenth year since the death of Maximilla."

=== Scholarship ===
Biblical scholar Dr. Alastair Kirkland highlights the significance of Ammia being consistently identified as a local prophetess from Philadelphia, the first major town after Hierapolis on the route from the interior to the coast at Smyrna. He points out that this reflects the local pride tied to her role.

Ammia of Philadelphia remains an enigmatic figure in early Christian history. According to Dr. Lyn M. Kidson, she was "unknown now but well known enough by ancient audiences," highlighting her significance in antiquity despite the lack of detailed information about her life. Mitchell Locklear similarly notes that "little is known" about her, emphasizing the scarcity of historical records.

Anne Jensen compares Ammia and Anonyma of Caesarea, noting that Anonyma is the last documented female prophetess in the extant sources and the only one in the mainstream church about whom more is known than Ammia.

== See also ==
- List of Christian women of the early church
- Women in Church history
- Prophets in Christianity
- Montanism
- Philadelphia (Asia Minor)
- Book of Acts
- Book of Revelation (Philadelphia is mentioned)
