= Quintilla =

3rd century Phrygian Christian Montanist prophetess

Quintilla (fl. 3rd century) was a Phrygian Christian prophetess within the movement known as Montanism. The sect of the Quintillians was named after her.

Although her exact dates are unknown, Quintilla was probably not a contemporary of the Three—Montanus, Maximilla and Priscilla, the first generation of Montanist prophets—but was active some decades later, after the Three were dead. This would place her in the 3rd century AD. Epiphanius of Salamis, a strong opponent of Montanism, provides the only surviving account of Quintilla's Christophany in his Panarion, part 49. He had heard it attributed both to her and to Priscilla, but the former is more probable. His account is generally regarded as authentic. While in Pepuza, Christ in the form of a woman in a bright robe visited her in a dream, imparted wisdom to her and revealed that Pepuza was a holy place where the New Jerusalem would descend. This should probably be interpreted as Christ manifested in the form of the church above bringing wisdom to his church on earth.

There are no books nor any collections of sayings attributed to Quintilla, but her followers kept her memory and her doctrine alive long after her death. Epiphanius says that they came to Pepuza for their initiation rites. They had women clergy, which they defended by appealing to Miriam's status as a prophet and the daughters of Philip. Epiphanius also says that they believed that Eve was wise to have eaten the fruit of the Tree of Knowledge. If this last report is accurate, it suggests that later Quintillians had adopted certain Gnostic teachings.

For Epiphanius, the Quintillianists are synonymous with the Priscillianists, Phrygians and Pepuzians and a sister sect of the Artotyrites and Tascodrugites. Augustine of Hippo and John of Damascus also mention Quintillians among the Montanist sects. According to the Praedestinatus, which was probably composed during the papacy of Sixtus III (432–440), there were two churches at Pepuza, one dedicated to Priscilla and another dedicated to Quintilla.
