= Thraseas =

Saint Thraseas

Martyr and Bishop of Eumenia
- Died: 170; Smyrna (modern-day İzmir, Turkey)
- Venerated in: Roman Catholic Church, Eastern Orthodox Church
- Canonized: Pre-congregation
- Feast: 27 October

Saint Thraseas (? – 170) was a martyr under the reign of Emperor Marcus Aurelius. Prior to his death he served as Bishop of Eumenia, Phrygia, in Asia Minor.

== Background ==
Eumenia was a titular see of Phrygia Pacatiana in Asia Minor. The city was founded by Attalus II Philadelphus (159–138 B.C.) at the sources of the Cludrus, near the Glaucus, and named after his brother Eumenes. Numerous inscriptions and many coins remain to show that Eumenia was an important and prosperous city under Roman rule. As early as the third century its population was in great part Christian, and it seems to have suffered much during the persecution of Diocletian.

== History ==
In a synodal letter written by Polycrates of Ephesus about the year 190, he speaks of seven of his relatives who had been bishops before him. Besides these he mentions Polycarp and Papirius of Smyrna, Thraseas of Eumenea, Sagaris of Laodicea and Melito of Sardes (Eusebius, "Hist. Eccles.", v, 24, 2 sq.)

Thraseas was a Quartodeciman Christian leader, in Asia Minor in the second century. Quartodecimans kept Passover on the 14th of Aviv (also known as Nisan), in spite of the preferences of Roman Bishops who preferred a Sunday date which ultimately became Easter Sunday. Eusebius recorded that around 195 A.D. Polycrates of Ephesus, wrote a letter to Pope Victor I regarding the dating of Easter.

In the letter, Thraseas is mentioned chronologically between Polycarp (155) and Sagaris (under Sergius Paulus, 166–67). The date of Thraseas is therefore about 160. Polycrates mentions that Thraseas was among those who observed the Passover on the date that was handed down from scriptures and the Apostle John, and thus, that he did not change to Sunday when some in Rome did.

Eusebius also wrote that Apollonius of Ephesus spoke in his work of Zoticus, who had tried to exorcise Maximilla, but had been prevented by Themison; and of the martyr-Bishop Thraseas, another adversary of Montanism.

Although he was from Eumenia, Thraseas was, according to Polycrates and Jerome, martyred in Smyrna.

The Life of Polycarp, attributed to St. Pionius, lists Thraseas of Eumenia, as a martyr who was buried at Smyrna. Mention is made of a burial at the cemetery in Smyrna to the cemetery in front of the Ephesian Royal gate, that took place near where recently a myrtle tree sprung up after the burial of the body of Thraseas the martyr.

== See also ==
- Easter controversy
