= Oded =

Oded (Hebrew: עודד) is a masculine given name from Hebrew, meaning "encouragement".

== People with this name ==
- Oded Baloush, Israeli footballer
- Oded Brandwein (born 1988), Israeli-Polish professional basketball player in the Israeli Premier League
- Oded Burla (1915–2009), Israeli writer, poet and artist
- Oded Davidoff (born 1967), Israeli film director
- Oded Elkayam (born 1988), Israeli footballer
- Oded Fehr (born 1970), Israeli actor
- Oded Galor (born 1953), Israeli economist
- Oded Gavish (born 1989), Israeli footballer
- Oded Golan (born 1951), Israeli engineer, entrepreneur, and antiquities collector
- Oded Goldreich (born 1957)
- Oded Ha-Carmeili, later Eddie Carmel (1936–1972), Israeli-born entertainer with gigantism and acromegaly, popularly known as "The Jewish Giant"
- Oded Liphshitz, Israeli playwright
- Oded Lipschits (born 1963), Israeli archaeologist and historian
- Oded Lowengart, Israel professor of marketing
- Oded Menashe (born 1969), Israeli actor and magician
- Oded Kattash (born 1974), Israeli basketball player and coach
- Oded Machnes (born 1956), Israeli football player
- Oded Schramm (1961–2008), Israeli-American mathematician

In the Bible, there were two people called Oded:

- Oded (father of Azariah)
- Oded (prophet)
