= Askos (pottery vessel) =

Ancient Greek pottery vessel

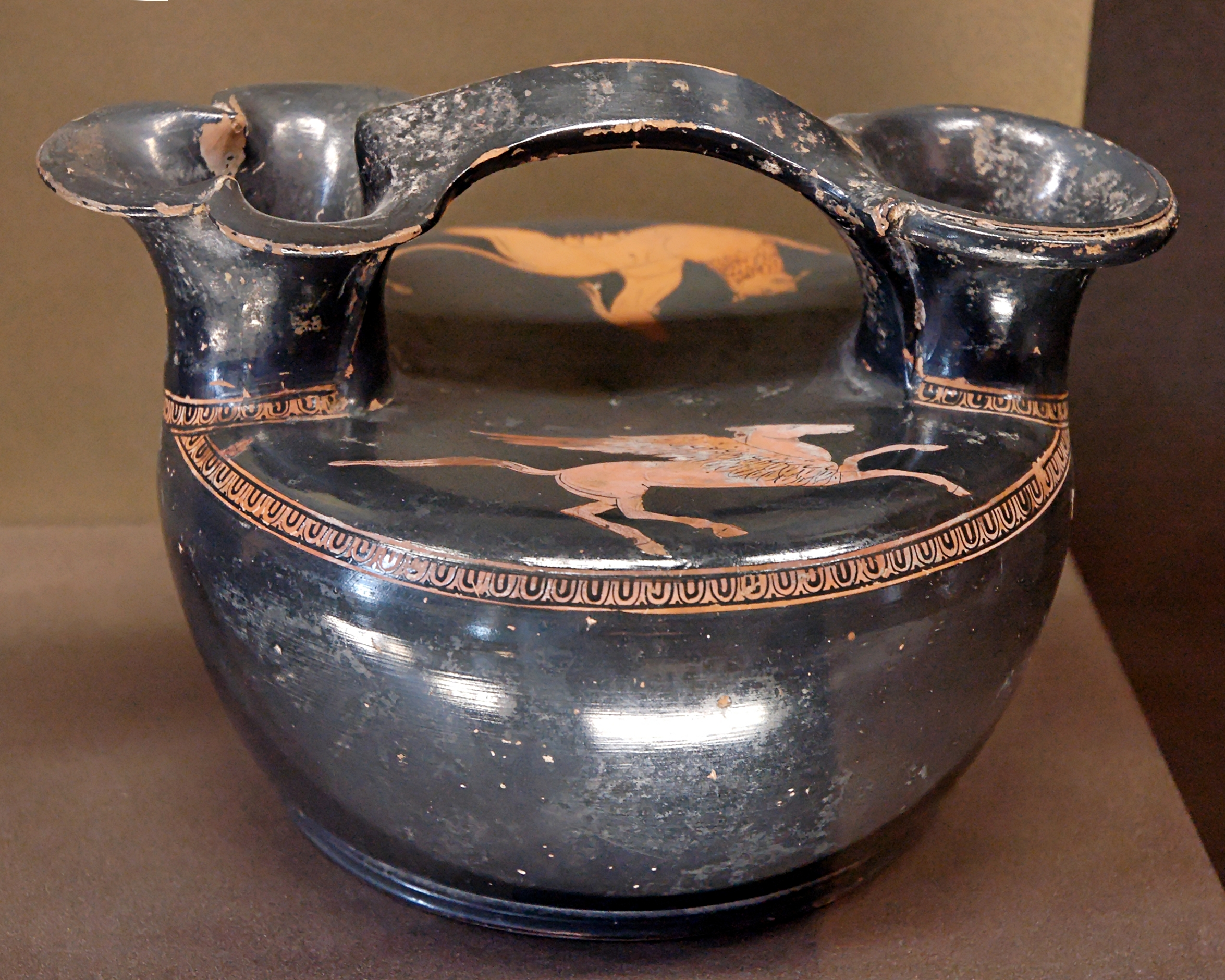
An unusually large Etruscan askos at the Louvre, showing Pegasus on side A and Chimera on side B

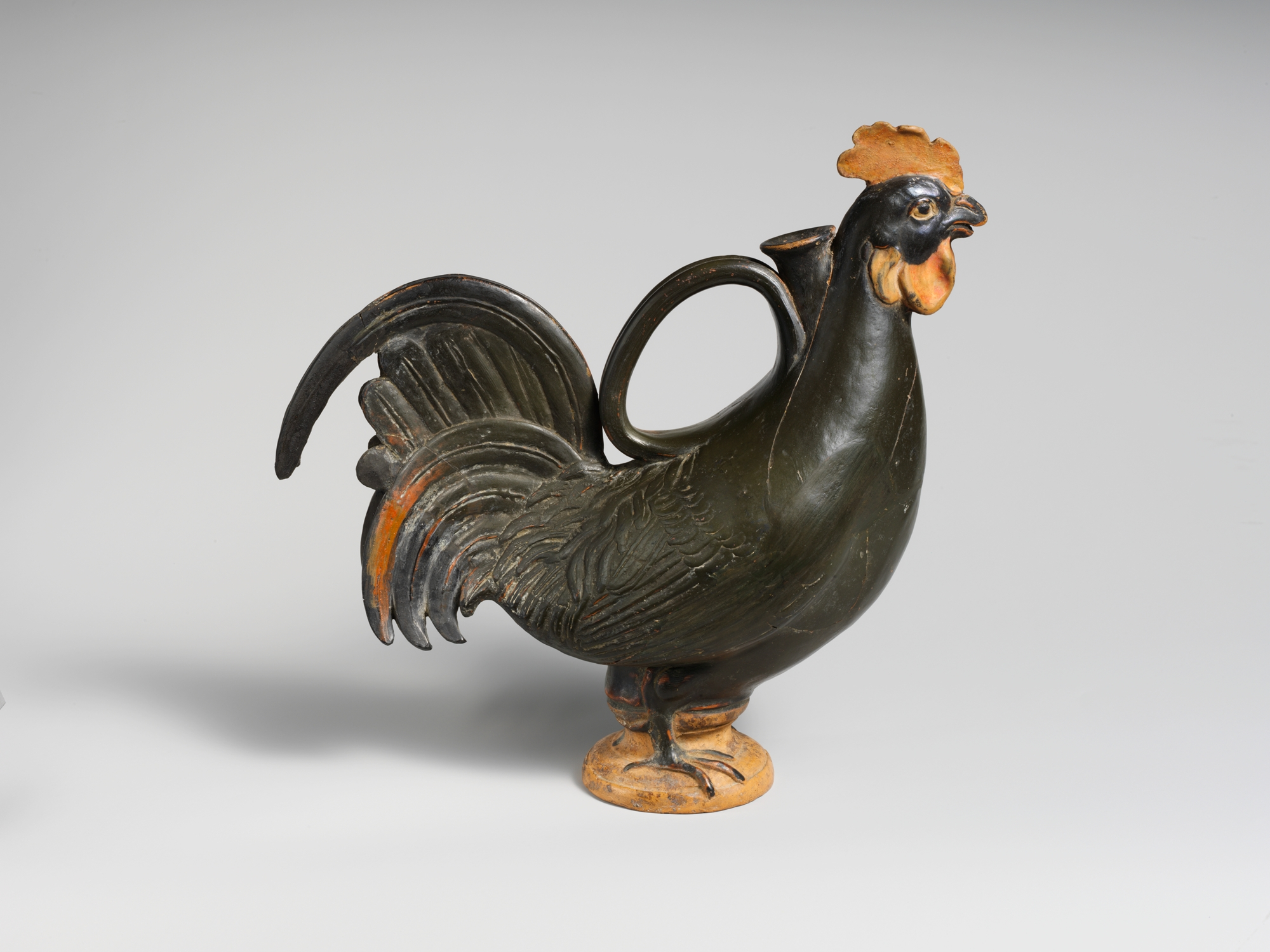
Etruscan askos in the form of a rooster, 4th century BC, Metropolitan Museum of Art, New York

Askos (Ancient Greek: ἀσκός "tube"; plural: ἀσκοί - askoi) is the name given in modern terminology to a type of ancient Greek pottery vessel used to pour small quantities of liquids such as oil. It is recognisable from its flat shape and a spout at one or both ends that could also be used as a handle. They were usually painted decoratively like vases and were mainly used for storing oil and refilling oil lamps.

These were extensively traded in and around the Mediterranean. An example of this is UC47602 in the Petrie Museum's collection, which is a Black Glazed vessel with an almost metallic appearance and was originally produced in Greece (the main production was in Attica), Etruria, and was excavated in Memphis.

The original meaning of ἀσκός is wineskin. The early Christian sect of the Ascitae takes its name from them. The Ascodrugitae, however, are unrelated except in a folk etymology.
