= Cicely Johnson =

English religious writer

- Died: after 1636/7
- Writing career
- Subject: Religious conversion
- Notable work: Fanatical Reveries
- Literary movement: Follower of Richard Farnham and John Bull

Cicely Johnson (after 1636/7) was an English woman living in Colchester. Her account of her conversion while under the influence of John Bull and Richard Farnham was discovered in John Rylands University Library in Manchester hundreds of years after she wrote it, in about 1636/7.

== Life ==
Johnson was said to have had a fair education as she could read, but it isn't known where or when she was born or her name at birth. By 16/17/8 she had arrived in Colchester with her husband Thomas. Her husband's job is not clear but he was skilled enough to have apprentices. Cicely and Thomas had three of their children baptised in the now demolished St Nicholas's church in Colchester in 1620, but by 1636 they had their daughter Sarah baptised at St James the Great, Colchester.

Johnson was a keen follower of preachers including Francis Liddell who was in Colchester from 1619 to 1628, and later, Richard Maden. Maden recommended John Knowles as his replacement. Knowles was a preacher from 1635 until 1637 when he was removed due to his nonconformity. Knowles was a popular Cambridge puritan. Johnson says that Knowles encouraged her to record the details of her religious conversion. Johnson was a follower of Richard Farnham and John Bull who were later arrested for their heresy.

Johnson and her husband were questioned by the authorities concerning their communication with the self-proclaimed prophet John Bull on 19 June 1636. In 1636 or 1637, she wrote an account of her conversion; this untitled work was later derogatively called "Fanatical Reveries". This account was discovered with a similar account by Rose Thurgood in the John Rylands University Library in the 21st century. No further details of her life are known.

Johnson's writing was transcribed at the time by "E.A" (maybe Elizabeth Addington who was another follower) along with several other related texts and it survived in the papers of the Gurney family. It was purchased in 1936 and only later gained scholarly attention when it was found in the "Gurney Miscellenea" at John Rylands University Library.
