= Timothy of Constantinople =

Early Christian scholar in Constantinople

Last page of Timothy's heresiography, from Bodleian MS Barocci 173, from an 11th-century Byzantine legal miscellany

Timothy of Constantinople (Greek: Τιμόθεος; fl. c. 600/700 (Note: His activity is usually dated to around 600, but it has been argued that he wrote in the early eighth century. Lieu places him in Constantinople during the reign of Heraclius (610–641).)) was a Chalcedonian Christian heresiologist and presbyter of the church of Hagia Sophia in Constantinople. He wrote a treatise in Greek on Christian heresies from a Chalcedonian perspective, On Those Who Enter the Church, or On the Reception of Heretics. (Note: Known by the Latin title De iis qui ad ecclesiam accedunt sive de receptione haereticorum.) This pastoral work is best described as "a handbook on the procedure for admitting heretics to the church".

Timothy classifies heresies based on the requirements for admission that the orthodox church placed on their members. In his first category were those heretics who would need to be baptised before they could be accepted into the church; in the second, those who needed to be anointed but not baptised; and in the third, those who only needed to abjure all heresy (including their own former beliefs) by pronouncing an anathema. The same three categories were used by Theodore the Studite writing one or two centuries later.

In the first class, Timothy lists Manichaeans, Tascodrugites, Ebionites, Valentinians, Basilidians, Montanists, Eunomians, Paulianists, Photinians, Marcellians, Sabellians, Simonians, Menandrians, Cerinthians, Saturninians, Carpocratians, Marcosians, Apelleasts, Theodotians, Elcesaites, Nepotians, Marcionites, Artotyrites, Saccophori, Apotactics, Encratites, Hydroparastatae, Nicolaitans, Melchisedechites, Pelagians and Caelestians. (Note: List drawn from Lieu, except for Marcionites, Artotyrites, Saccophori, Apotactics, Encratites, Hydroparastatae, Nicolaitans and Melchisedechites, drawn from Migne (1865).) These are mostly early heresies, many of them Gnostic sects. They represent theoretical problems more than actual ones, since few of them would have been active in Timothy's time. For this reason, Timothy does not distinguish between "elect" and "hearers" among the Manichaeans. He is interested in Manichaeism as a set of beliefs and not a practising sect. (Note: The earlier Commonitorium sancti Augustini, for example, required baptism for the admission of an elect but not a hearer.) He does provide a valuable list of Mani's works. Theodore the Studite, taking a more practical stance, lists only the Manichaeans, Tascodrugites and Marcionites in his first class.

Timothy's second class includes Quartodecimans, Novatianists, Arians, Pneumatomachi and Apollinarians.

Timothy's third class includes the major anti-Chalcedonian sects of Nestorians and Miaphysites, a collection of sects he calls Marcianists and also the Melitians, who he says commit no error but schism. His list of Marcianists includes Messalians, Euchites, Enthusiasts, Choreuts, Lampetians, Adelphians and Eustathians. He does not name any contemporary event in connection with these sects, possibly because they were all extinct by his time. Timothy gives two slightly different lists of the miaphysite sects. The first is a list of sixteen groups Timothy labels theopaschite and the second is a list of "the schismatics called diacrinomenoi", (Note: "Hesitants", those who hesitated to endorse the Council of Chalcedon (451).) which contains twelve groups. Together the two lists name the Eutychians, including the Dioscorians and Petrites; Acephali, who are subdivided into three sects; (Note: These are the Anthropomorphites, Barsanuphians and Esaianists.) Julianists, who are subdivided into three sects; (Note: Timothy equates Julianists and Gaianites.) and Severans or Theodosians, who are subdivided into eight factions (Agnoetae, Condobaudites, Niobites, two groups of Tritheists (Note: These were the Philoponians and the Cononites.) and the factions adhering to the patriarchs Damian, (Note: The Damianists were also called Angelites.) Peter and Paul). He recognized Jacob of Serugh as orthodox.

Several sects mentioned by Timothy, such as the Melchisedechites, he describes as having Jewish practices, including sabbatarianism, celebration of new moons and delaying baptism.

Some passages of Timothy are preserved only by quotation in the Pandects of the 11th-century monk Nikon of the Black Mountain.

== Editions ==
- Jean-Baptiste Cotelier (ed.), Ecclesiæ græcæ monumenta, Vol. 3 (Paris: 1686), pp. 377–420 (De receptione haereticorum) and 420–424 (Ex Niconis pandecte).
- Jacques Paul Migne (ed.), Patrologia Graeca, Vol. 86 (Paris: 1865), I, cols. 12–69 (De iis qui ad ecclesiam accedunt sive de receptione haereticorum) and 70–74 (Ex Niconis pandecte).
