= Alexander of Hierapolis =

Alexander of Hierapolis may refer to two different bishops of two different cities:

- Alexander of Hierapolis (Phrygia) (fl. 253), a bishop of Hierapolis in Phrygia (modern Pamukkale)
- Alexander of Hierapolis (Syria) (fl. 431), a Nestorian bishop of Hierapolis Bambyce in Syria (modern Manbij)
