= Rose Thurgood =

English religious author (b. c. 1602)

Rose Thurgood (born c. 1602) was an English religious writer, known as the author of one of the earliest English conversion narratives, "A Lecture of Repentance" (1637/8).

"A Lecture of Repentance" follows Thurgood's fall from a member of the king's court, to a woman in financial destitution, through the financial tumult of her "bad husband", and the following religious awakening. Presented in an epistolary and autobiographical format, the "Lecture" exhibits how Thurgood reacted to her change in fortune within her religion: opening with a revitalisation in religious zeal, she subsequently begins to "rage & swell" at God's judgement of her, then fearing herself damned for her "debt bill" of sins.

During this despair, she encounters the religious dissenters, John Bull and Richard Farnham who preach the lack of agency of man on his fate, before God's divine grace and judgement. Initially outraged at their opinions, Thurgood comes to accept them. With her financial troubles continuing, and struck with a "burning fever", Thurgood finds herself receiving a revelation from God, pronouncing her one of his chosen few. The "Lecture" then concludes, with her poverty unrelieved but content in her knowledge that, though she has little, God "hath [...] given mee Christ".

The "Lecture" has been the subject of some scholarship, much from Naomi Baker. Its status as a "unique opportunity to hear the voice of a seventeenth-century woman living in extreme poverty", has been examined. With this, the accompanying evidence of the lives of lower-class Puritans has been discussed: referring to the way these dissenters would have read the Bible, understood Calvinist theories of agency, and reconciled their femininity within religion.

== Biography ==
Rose Thurgood was born around 1602, as one of seven children. She later associated with the Colchester prophets Richard Farnham and John Bull, perhaps suggesting an origin in the Essex town. With no less than three elder sisters, she learned fine needlework while young and took an interest in contemporary fashion. She apparently associated with the king's court, socialising with its "Knights and Ladies, of great account".

After her marriage, and the birth of at least four children (the eldest, named Mary), Thurgood's high social status decayed, as she and her family began to regress into "extreame povertie and want". The precise cause or timing of this bereavement is not given, with Thurgood blaming it on her "bad husband", but the turbulent economic climate of the early-17th-century would have made such financial fluctuations typical. She was forced into work as her husband sold off his "land and living", leaving her and her children hungry. This extreme turn in fortune made her question God's benevolence or existence, leading a personal experience with radical Nonconformist preachers, and later self-proclaimed prophets, John Bull and Richard Farnham.

Thurgood eventually reconciled her faith with an ascetic view towards her material privation. Thurgood later, in her "Lecture", pointed to a "sweet flash" on 4 November 1635/6 as the turning point of her faith, likely upon prompting from millenarian preachers to identify such a divine revelation. By 1636/7 she composed the "Lecture of Repentance", which she is now best known for, and is the main source of her life. After this point, nothing is known of her life.

== "A Lecture of Repentance" (1636/7) ==
=== Content ===
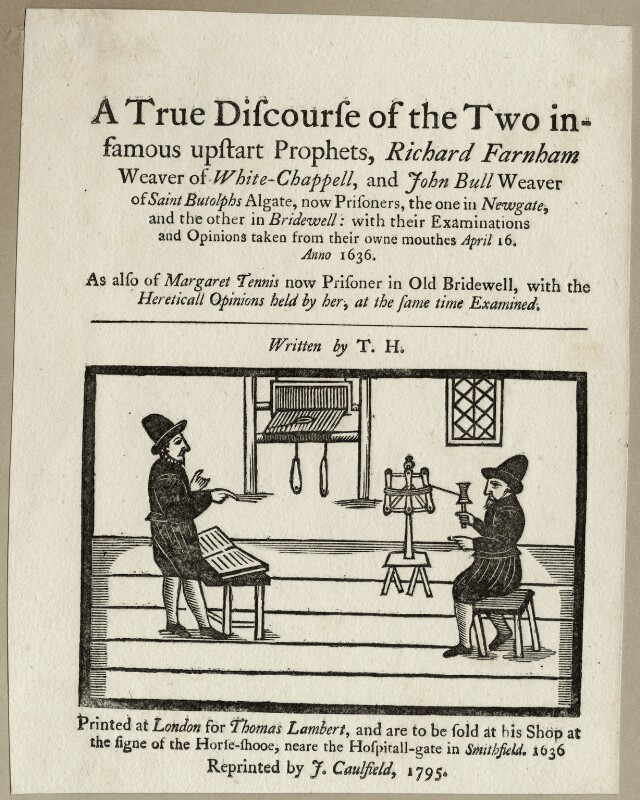
John Bull and Richard Farnham, depicted on a 1636 pamphlet woodcut. Bull and Farnham played a significant part in Thurgood's development as a Puritan.

"A Lecture of Repentance" is Thurgood's only surviving work, presented as a conversion narrative in an epistolary form. The "Lecture" is introduced as a letter from Thurgood to her mother, who she had not seen for ten years, later adding to this address, her "sisters & friends or whatsoever thou art". The "Lecture" was transcribed by an 'E. A.' (possibly Elizabeth Addington, wife of John Bull, Thurgood's spiritual advisor.) in a volume of transcriptions, now preserved in John Rylands Library, Manchester. This volume also contains another early Puritan conversion narrative, by Cicely Johnson, and several petitions of Richard Farnham. According to early modern literature scholar, Abigail Shinn, "Thurgood may have been somewhat restricted from publishing due to their gender and [...] social class". Thurgood's narrative is one of the earliest surviving examples of an English conversion narrative.

The narrative of the "Lecture" concerns Thurgood's fall into poverty, loss of faith, and subsequent Puritan awakening and reconciliation. She briefly touches on a time in London, where she "worke fine workes with [her] needle" and mingled "not with people of themeaner sort, but with them, that belonged to the kings court", "knights and Ladies of great account". The narrative is thereon predominated by her "bad husband", who unwisely sells off his land, leaving her family in poverty, and how "the poorer hee was the worse hee was". Living in "extreame povertie and want", Thurgood declined into requiring her own "poore labours" to feed her, now malnourished, young children, dreading their starvation. She begins by "goe[ing] to Church oftner than I was wont to doe" but eventually, this despair is realised in frustration with God:

And I now seeing my selfe in this extreme povertie & want and all my household was sicke agayne [...] Then I began to rage & swell at God himselfe, saying to my selfe, what a God is this, what doth he minde to doe with my Children, surely they will dye [...] And I said to a neighbour of myne, that I could not abide this life any longer [...] I would not live to see my children starve.

Thurgood, heaped upon with financial calamity, begins to see "a garison of Devills gaping with open mouth for mee", believing her fated damnation, as the "Devill came with my debt bill, and my whole debt was to paye", with her fortune as recompense for her sins. She records that, after this, and two years before she composed the narrative, she came across the religious dissenters, Bull and Farnham, who preached a radical Calvinist doctrine of the believer as powerless before God, with God solely responsible for their fate and conversion, and allowing "noe doubting" of God. They told Thurgood:

that God heard none of my prayers; what none of my prayers (said I to them). Noe none of my prayers, said they to mee; For what you received it was of Gods mercy towards you, and nott for your praying [...] Then said I to them, you shall never make mee believe that, but God heard my prayers; so home I came, very angry I was with them, to thinke how hott they were against mee for my praying.

Thurgood's immediate response was outrage at these Nonconformist teachings but she eventually came to internalise them: "Theise and such words would they saye when I talked with them, but now I cared not what they said to mee, though I were angry before with them: for now my desire was to understand and knowe the Grounds of Religion". This despair continued for a year after her exposure to this radical doctrine, going as far to threatening to "goe from my husband" to an incredulous neighbour. Thurgood recalls one particular episode where she lay in bed with a "burning fever", tormented by the cries of her malnourished family, and feeling as if she could 'not abide this life any longer'. However, at 8 AM, on 4 November 1635/6, she experienced a revelation, as she "felt a sweet Flash coming over my heart, and suddenly withall theise words were pronounced in my heart: Thy name is written in the booke of Life: Thou hast that white stone, and a newe name" - indicating her status as one of the chosen few of God.

The "Lecture" concludes with Thurgood content, though without material improvement. She summarises that: "though God hath taken from mee my wealth and sent mee povertie; yet hath hee given mee Christ and through him I receive all fulns [fullness]". She thanks those who have given her financial support, in feeding the "hard & hungrie stomaks" of her family.

=== Scholarship ===
The exceptionally low social status of a surviving English author has been remarked upon. According to Naomi Baker, a major scholar of Thurgood's work, Rose Thurgood's narrative is remarkable in giving "a rare and fascinating glimpse into the lives of puritan women in the early decades of the seventeenth century", "particularly significant as an almost unique opportunity to hear the voice of a seventeenth-century woman living in extreme poverty"; "economic desperation was by no means an exceptional experience in England in the first decades of the seventeenth century, yet texts articulating the agony of a woman who 'could not abide this life any longer' because she 'would not live to see [her] children starve' are extremely rare from this period".

Baker has published several critical analyses of Thurgood's "Lecture of Repentance", often alongside Cicely Johnson's similar conversion narrative. Baker cites Thurgood's concurrent use of the Geneva Bible and King James Bible as evidence of "a somewhat more complicated picture of the use of the two versions of the Bible by English Puritans" than had previously been considered. Baker also discusses the "teleological structure" Thurgood presents of her life, autobiography allowing her to "impose an artificial coherence onto material events", with its structure pivoted on her divine revelation, and all prior narration leading up to it. In a 2004 paper, Baker examines the "concepts of agency" in Thurgood's work, seeing it through the lens of Calvinism and the concomitant "death of the self", with Thurgood's ideas testifying "that historically constrained subjectivities, even those structured around the 'death' of the self, are not synonymous with a lack of agency".

== Sources ==
- Baker, Naomi (2003a). "The Devil and the Debt Bill: Poverty, Theology and the Self in Rose Thurgood's "a Lecture of Repentance" (1636-37)". Literature and Theology. 17 (3): 324–340. doi:10.1093/litthe/17.3.324.
- Baker, Naomi (2003b). "Use of the Geneva and King James Bibles in Rose Thurgood, "a Lecture of Repentance" (1636–1637) and Cicely Johnson, "Fanatical Reveries" (c. 1636–1637)". Notes and Queries. 50 (2): 172–175. doi:10.1093/nq/500172.
- Baker, Naomi (2004). "Counterfeiting nature: constructing agency in the life writings of Rose Thurgood and Cicely Johnson". Women's Writing. 11 (3): 331–346. doi:10.1080/09699080400200235. S2CID 219614014.
- Baker, Naomi (2007). "Thurgood, Rose (b. c. 1602), religious writer". Oxford Dictionary of National Biography (online ed.). Oxford University Press. doi:10.1093/ref:odnb/66708. (Subscription, Wikipedia Library access or UK public library membership required.)
- Baker, Naomi (2012). "Johnson, Cicely and Thurgood, Rose". The Encyclopedia of English Renaissance Literature. Vol. 2. Wiley-Blackwell. ISBN 9781405194495.
- Lynch, Kathleen (2012). Protestant Autobiography in the Seventeenth-Century Anglophone World. Oxford: Oxford University Press. ISBN 9780199643936.
- Shinn, Abigail (2018). Conversion Narratives in Early Modern England: Tales of Turning. Springer. ISBN 9783319965772.
- "John Rylands Library, English MS 875". Archives Hub.
