= Blastus (Montanist) =

Blastus was a 2nd-century leader of the Roman Montanists, a presbyter in Rome and a Quartodeciman, however likely born in Alexandria. Blastus caused a schism in Rome about Easter and gained many followers. Some scholars have argued that the hostility of Pope Victor I against the Quartodecimans, was caused by Blastus' schism. Blastus argued that Christians must keep Easter at the same time commanded in the Book of Exodus. Blastus was accused of judaizing the Church by pseudo-Tertullian. Irenaeus wrote a letter to Blastus called "on Schism" which is no longer extant.

Eusebius mentions Blastus along with Florinus stating:

Others, of whom Florinus was chief, flourished at Rome. He fell from the presbyterate of the Church, and Blastus was involved in a similar fall. They also drew away many of the Church to their opinion, each striving to introduce his own innovations in respect to the truth.

== See also ==
- Florinus
- Montanus
- Miltiades (Christian)
