= Iarlaithe mac Loga =

Irish saint

Saint Iarlaithe mac Loga
- St Jarlath by Harry Clarke
- Died: 26 December, c. 540
- Venerated in: Roman Catholic Church; Eastern Orthodox Church
- Feast: 6 June (currently); 25 or 26 December (earlier)
- Patronage: Archdiocese of Tuam

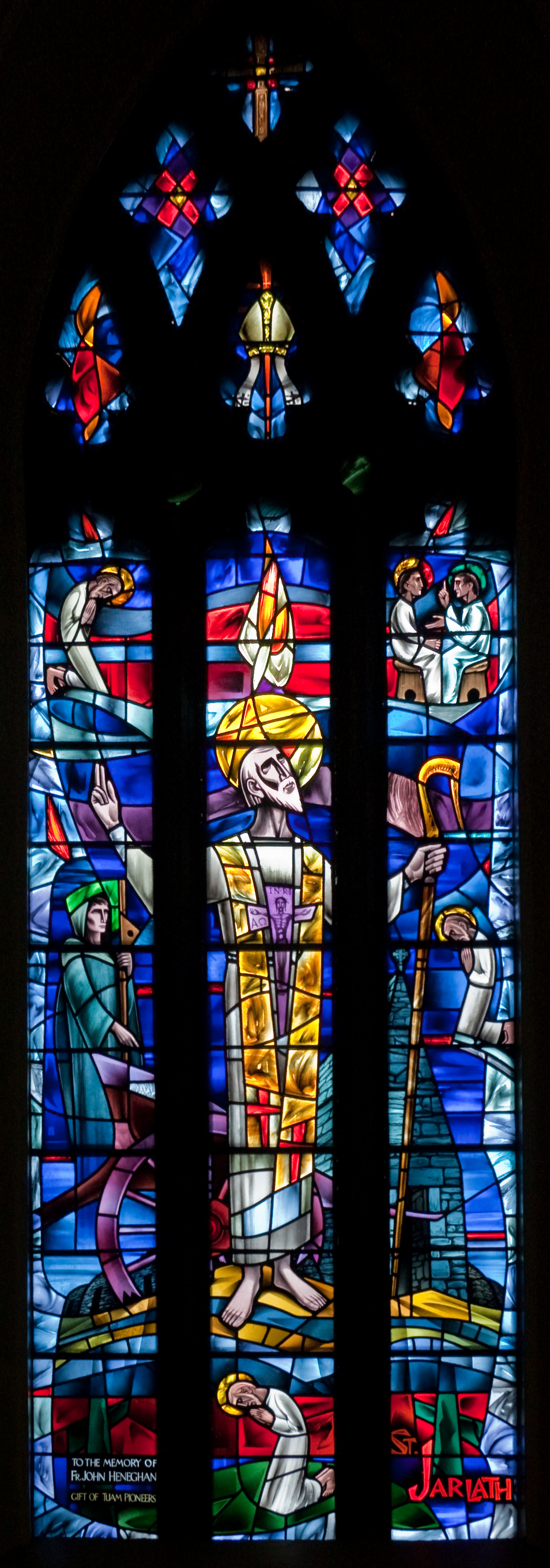
Jarlath as depicted in a stained glass window of Tuam Cathedral, designed by Richard King in 1961

Iarlaithe mac Loga (Irish pronunciation: [ˈiəɾˠl̪ˠahə mˠək ˈl̪ˠɔgə]; fl. 6th century), also known as Jarlath (/ˈdʒɑːrləθ/), was an Irish priest and scholar from Connacht, remembered as the founder of the monastic School of Tuam and of the Archdiocese of Tuam, of which he is the patron saint. No medieval biography of Jarlath is extant, but sources for his life and cult include genealogies, martyrologies, the Irish Lives of St Brendan of Clonfert, and a biography compiled by John Colgan in the 17th century.

== Background ==
The Irish genealogies record the existence of two saints named Jarlath: Jarlath son of Lugh (Iarlaithe m. Loga), founder of Tuam, and Jarlath son of Trian (Iarlaithe m. Trena), bishop of Armagh.

Jarlath of Tuam is said to have belonged to the Conmhaicne, who ruled over the greater part of what would become the parish of Tuam. The other saint is said to have belonged to the Dál Fiatach in east Ulster. He (which one?) is identified as the third Bishop of Armagh, that is after Patrick's heir Benignus and the Annals of Ulster and Innisfallen record his death in the year 481.

In the two Irish Lives of Brendan, possibly of the 12th century, Jarlath is called a son of Lug, son of Trén, son of Fiacc, son of Mochta, and the First Life in the Book of Lismore continues the pedigree by calling Mochta a son of Bresal, son of Siracht, son of Fiacha the Fair. Both Lives substitute Imchada for Mochta and on this basis, Séamus Mac Mathúna argues that they go back to an original which conflates the genealogy of Iarlaithe mac Loga with that of his namesake in Armagh.

Dónall Mac Giolla Easpaig suggests that the saints could refer to one and the same person:

[...] both are given as the third bishop of Armagh [...] placename evidence from the Tuam area would tend to corroborate [this] view [...] the evidence suggests that there was a strong Patrician and, consequently, a strong Armagh influence in the Tuam area from the earliest Christian period [...] the fact that Iarlaithe was a bishop like Benignus of Kilbennan and Felartus of Donaghpatrick, would further indicate that Tuam [...] would have predated Brendan of Clonfert by almost a century.

== Brendan's Irish Lives ==
Jarlath appears briefly as a prominent figure in the medieval Irish Lives of Brendan of Clonfert. Brendan is said to have visited Connacht to study under the famous Jarlath. One day, when Jarlath was in his old age, Brendan advised his mentor to leave the school and to depart in a newly built chariot until its two hind shafts broke, because there would be the place of his resurrection (esséirge) and that of many after him. Because Jarlath acknowledged the divinity and superior wisdom of his pupil, saying "take me into thy service for ever and ever", he gladly accepted his advice. His travel did not take him very far, as the shafts broke at Tuaim da Ghualann ("Mound of two shoulders"), that is, at Tuam.

Jarlath died, "full of days", on 26 December, circa 540, aged about 90 years old.

In attributing a leading role to St Brendan in the foundation of Tuam, the Lives suggest that the see of Tuam was united with but subordinate to that of Annaghdown.

Tuam achieved the status of the principal see of Connacht only in 1152 at the Synod of Kells-Mellifont, while Annaghdown became an independent diocesan seat at the Synod of Dublin in 1192. In this light, the assertion in the Lives has been read as reflecting circumstances in the 12th century.

== Foundation of Tuam ==
Jarlath's broken wheel on Tuam Coat of Arms

John Colgan drew up a memoir of the saint in his Acta Sanctorum Hiberniae (1645). Jarlath is said to have studied under St Benignus at Kilbennen, disciple of St Patrick.

Afterwards, he founded his first monastery at Cluainfois (Cloonfush), near Tuam, while his principal seat came to be at Tuam. His monastic school is said to have attracted scholars from all parts of Ireland, including such students as Brendan of Ardfert and Colman of Cloyne. On the significance of the place-name Tuam, Dónall Mac Giolla Easpaig posits:

"[t]he first element in the placename Tuaim Dá Ualann/Ghualann referred to a pagan burial-ground similar to that designated by the second element of Cluain Fearta (see Clonfert). If so Tuam offers another example of an early church being built on or near a pre-Christian sacred site."

Despite his fame, Jarlath left Cloonfush to study under Enda of Aran around 495. In the 520s, he retired to Tuam. He chose Tuam because the wheel of his chariot broke there. Jarlath is included in the second order of Irish saints, which implies that he must have lived prior to the year 540.

A poem ascribed to Cuimmín of Coindeire, which is also cited in Ó Cléirigh's Martyrology of Donegal, states that Jarlath was known for his generosity and devotion to prayer ("three hundred genuflexions every night, and three hundred genuflexions every day"). In the Martyrology of Donegal, he is credited with having predicted the names of his successors, including those of three 'heretical' bishops and one Máel. Similarly, his hagiography in the "Great Synaxaristes of the Orthodox Church" records that as a result of his great asceticism and devotion to prayer he was granted the gift of prophecy.

== Feast-day ==
Saint Jarlath's feast day is 6 June, which is the date of the translation of his relics to a church specially built in his honour next to the Cathedral of Tuam. His remains were encased in a silver shrine, from which the 13th-century church gained the name Teampul na scrín, that is the "church of the shrine", a perpetual vicarage united to the prebend of Kilmainemore in 1415. In a note added to the Félire Óengusso and in other martyrologies, Jarlath's feast-day was recorded as 25 or 26 December.

== Jarlath in the 21st century ==
The first St Jarlath's Festival in Tuam, organised by the Energise Tuam community group, was organised for Saturday 7 June 2008. This included a pageant/parade from Tuam Cathedral through the streets of the town, a school's art competition to raise awareness of the saint and local cultural heritage, and street entertainment.

St Jarlath's broken wheel is a heraldic symbol of Tuam, and is included on the crest of many local organisations, including Tuam Town Council.

St Jarlath Road, a residential street in Cabra in Dublin 7 is named in his honour.

== Parishes named after St Jarlath ==
Oakland, California
Yarragon, Australia
Jos, Plateau State, Nigeria
The church of St Jarlath in Chicago, Illinois was demolished in 1969.

== See also ==
- School of Tuam
- St. Jarlath's College
- Aed Ua Oisin

Preceded by New creation	Abbot of Tuam c. 520? - c.540	Succeeded by Nuada ua Bolcain

== Primary sources ==
- Óengus of Tallaght (1905). Stokes, Whitley (ed.). The Martyrology of Oengus the Culdee. Henry Bradshaw Society. Vol. 29. London.
- Martyrology of Donegal, ed. J.H. Todd and W. Reeves, The Martyrology of Donegal, a calendar of the saints of Ireland. Dublin, 1864. [pp. 348–9 (26 December)]
- Poem ascribed to Cuimmín, ed. and tr. Whitley Stokes, "Cuimmín's poem on the saints of Ireland." ZCP 1 (1897). pp. 59–73.
- Colgan, John. Acta Sanctorum Hiberniae. Leuven, 1645. 308–10.
- The First Irish Life of St Brendan
  - ed. and tr. Whitley Stokes, Lives of Saints from the Book of Lismore. Anecdota Oxoniensia, Mediaeval and Modern Series 5. Oxford, 1890. pp. 99–116, 247–61. Based on the Book of Lismore copy.
  - ed. and tr. Denis O’Donoghue, Brendaniana. St Brendan the Voyager in Story and Legend. Dublin, 1893. Partial edition and translation, based on the Book of Lismore as well as copies in Paris BNF celtique et basque 1 and BL Egerton 91.
- The Second Irish Life of St Brendan (conflated with the Navigatio). Brussels, Bibliothèque Royale de Belgique 4190–4200 (transcript by Mícheál Ó Cléirigh)
  - ed. and tr. Charles Plummer, Bethada náem nÉrenn. Lives of the Irish saints. Oxford: Clarendon, 1922. Vol. 1. pp. 44–95; vol 2.
- Great Synaxaristes of the Orthodox Church: (in Greek) Ὁ Ἅγιος Ζαρλάθιος Ἐπίσκοπος Τούαμ Ἰρλανδίας. 6 Ιουνίου. ΜΕΓΑΣ ΣΥΝΑΞΑΡΙΣΤΗΣ.(in Greek)

== Secondary sources ==
- "Energise Tuam". Archived from the original on 9 October 2008.
- Charles-Edwards, T.M. (2007). "Connacht, saints of (act. c.400–c.800)", Oxford Dictionary of National Biography. Oxford University Press, Sept 2004: January 2007; accessed 14 December 2008.
- Mac Giolla Easpaig, Dónall (1996). "Early Ecclesiastical Settlement Names of County Galway", Galway: History and Society. Interdisciplinary essays on the history of an Irish county, ed. Gerard Moran. Dublin: Geography Publications. pp. 795–815.
- Mac Mathúna, Séamus (2006). "The Irish Life of Saint Brendan: Textual History, Structure and Date", The Brendan Legend. Texts and versions, ed. Glyn Burgess and Clara Strijbosch. Leiden, Boston: Brill, pp. 117–58.
