= Euchites =

Christian group from Mesopotamia

The Euchites or Messalians were a Christian sect from Mesopotamia that spread to Asia Minor (modern-day Turkey) and Thrace. The name 'Messalian' comes from the Syriac ܡܨܠܝܢܐ, mṣallyānā, meaning 'one who prays'. The Greek translation is εὐχίτης, euchitēs, meaning the same.

== History ==
They are first mentioned in the 370s by Ephrem the Syrian, Epiphanius of Salamis, and Jerome, and are also mentioned by Archbishop Atticus of Constantinople, Theodotus of Antioch, and Archbishop Sisinnius I of Constantinople. They were first condemned as heretical in a synod in 383 AD (Side, Pamphylia), whose acta was referred to in the works of Photius. Their leader was supposedly a man named Peter who claimed to be Jesus. Before being stoned for his blasphemies, he promised his followers that after three days he would rise from his tomb in the shape of a wolf, attracting the title of Lycopetrus or Peter the Wolf. The mainstream Christian leaders believed it was not the man Peter who would come out of the grave, but a devil in disguise.

They continued to exist for several centuries, influencing the Bogomils of Bulgaria (who are called Lycopetrians in an abjuration formula of 1027) and, thereby, also influencing the Bosnian Church and Catharism.

Michael Psellos, a Byzantine monk, accused Bogomils and Euchites of orgiastic practices, incest, and homosexuality. Furthermore, he argued that children born from these promiscuous activities were brought before a Satanic assembly after eight days, offered up to Satan and then cannibalistically eaten. This cannibalistic act was supposedly a parody of baptism. Euthymios Zigabenos, a later Byzantine monastic writer, would make the same accusations. Such charges have a long history, and historians debate whether they are truthful to any degree: the idea of these unholy acts can be traced back further to alleged practices of certain Gnostic sects; indeed, a similar literary tradition regarding heresies seems to have been brought into existence well before the Christian era, during the reign of the Seleucid ruler Antiochus IV Epiphanes.

Modern scholarship has also questioned whether a coherent heretical movement existed behind these condemnations, and has emphasised instead the friction in the Eastern Church caused by Messalianism's "ascetical practices and imagistic language far more characteristic of Syriac Christianity than of the imperial Church centred on Constantinople".

== Teachings ==
The sect's teaching asserted that:

1. The essence (ousia) of the Trinity could be perceived by the carnal senses.
2. The Threefold God transformed himself into a single hypostasis (substance) in order to unite with the souls of the perfect.
3. God has taken different forms in order to reveal himself to the senses.
4. Only such sensible revelations of God confer perfection upon the Christian.
5. The state of perfection, freedom from the world and passion, is therefore attained solely by prayer, not through the church, baptism and or any of the sacraments, which have no effect on the passions or the influence of evil on the soul (hence their name, which means "Those who pray").

Messalians taught that once a person experienced the essence of God they were freed from moral obligations or ecclesiastical discipline. They had male and female teachers, the "perfecti", whom they honored more than the clergy. The condemnation of the sect by John Damascene and Timothy of Constantinople expressed the view that the sect espoused a sort of mystical materialism. Their critics also accused them of incest, cannibalism and "debauchery" (in Armenia, their name came to mean "filthy") but scholars reject these claims.

== In Mandaean texts ==
Gelbert (2013, 2023) suggests that in the Ginza Rabba (Right Ginza 9.1), the Mandaic term minunaiia ("Mnunaeans" or "Minunaeans") is actually a reference to the Messalians or Euchites.

== See also ==
- Marcianists (Messalian sect)
- Martyrians (Messalian sect)
- Athinganoi
- Carpocratians
- Constantine Chrysomalus
- Timothy of Constantinople

== Bibliography ==
- Lossky, Vladimir (1983). The vision of God. Crestwood, N.Y: St. Vladimir's Seminary Press. ISBN 0-913836-19-2. OCLC 10145807.
- Plested, Marcus (2004). The Macarian legacy : the place of Macarius-Symeon in the Eastern Christian tradition. Oxford Theological Monographs. Oxford New York: Oxford University Press. ISBN 0-19-926779-0. OCLC 56319750.
- Obolensky, Dimitri (2004) [1948]. The Bogomils: A Study in Balkan Neo-Manichaeism. Cambridge University Press. ISBN 978-0-521-60763-6.
- Runciman, Steven (1947). The Medieval Manichee: A Study of the Christian Dualist Heresy. Cambridge University Press.
