= School of Tuam =

The school of Tuam was founded by Jarlath. During the eleventh century, it rivalled Clonmacnoise as the centre of Celtic art.

It was founded when Brendan told Jarlath to go eastward from Cluainfois (now Cloonfush); where the wheel of his chariot should break on the journey "there you shall build your oratory, for God will that there shall be the place of your resurrection, and many shall arise in glory in the same place along with you". Soon after Jarlath departed Cluainfois, his chariot broke down on the site of the present Protestant cathedral (formerly Catholic) in Tuam, where he built his church and monastic school.

After the death of Jarlath there is little in the national annals about the school of Tuam. There is reference in the Annals of the Four Masters, under date 776, to the death of an Abbot of Tuam, Nuada O'Bolcan. Under the same date in the Annals of Ulster, there is reference to the death of Ferdomnach of Tuaim da Ghualann. At the year 969 is set down the death of Eoghan O Cleirigh, Bishop of Connacht, but more distinct reference to a Tuam prelate is found in 1085, when the death of Aedh O Hoisin is recorded. The Four Masters call him Comarb of Jarlath and High Bishop of Tuam.
