= Marcianists =

Messalian sect

The Marcianists were a sect of Messalians founded by Marcian of Pontus in the sixth century. They were regarded as heretics by Chalcedonian Christians.

Sophronius of Jerusalem, in his Synodical Letter, names their leader as Lampetius, a follower of Marcian. He is described as having a sect of his own, the Lampetianoi, by Timothy of Constantinople and Maximus the Confessor. Timothy, writing probably towards 600, classifies the Messalians, Euchites, Enthusiasts, Choreuts, Adelphians and Eustathians as Marcianist sects. He says that Marcian was a moneychanger during the reigns of Justinian I (527–565) and Justin II (565–574). He does not name any contemporary event in connection with the Marcianists, possibly because the sect was extinct by his time. Timothy's description of Marcianism shows that they rejected charity and believes that misfortune reflected a lack of the Holy Spirit:

They say neither to give alms to the beggar, nor to the widow, nor to the orphan, nor to those in difficult circumstances, nor to those afflicted with leprosy, nor to those who have encountered thieves, barbarian invasion or any other misfortune. Rather they should keep it all for themselves because those other (unfortunates) are really poor in the spirit.

In the 590s, John of Chalcedon and Athanasius of Isauria condemned for Marcianism fled from Constantinople to Rome to appeal their cases to Pope Gregory the Great. It is clear from Gregory's letters that the heresy of Marcianism was unknown in Rome. Gregory absolved John of heresy in 595 and Athanasius in 596, although had to first denounce a book in his possession containing Manichaean errors. The emperor Maurice was accused by a Constantinopolitan mob of being a Marcianist in 602, a fact recorded by both Theophylact Simocatta and Theophanes the Confessor. This accusation may have referred to the emperor's refusal to ransom captives from the war with the Avars in 598–599.
