= Diocese of Hierapolis =

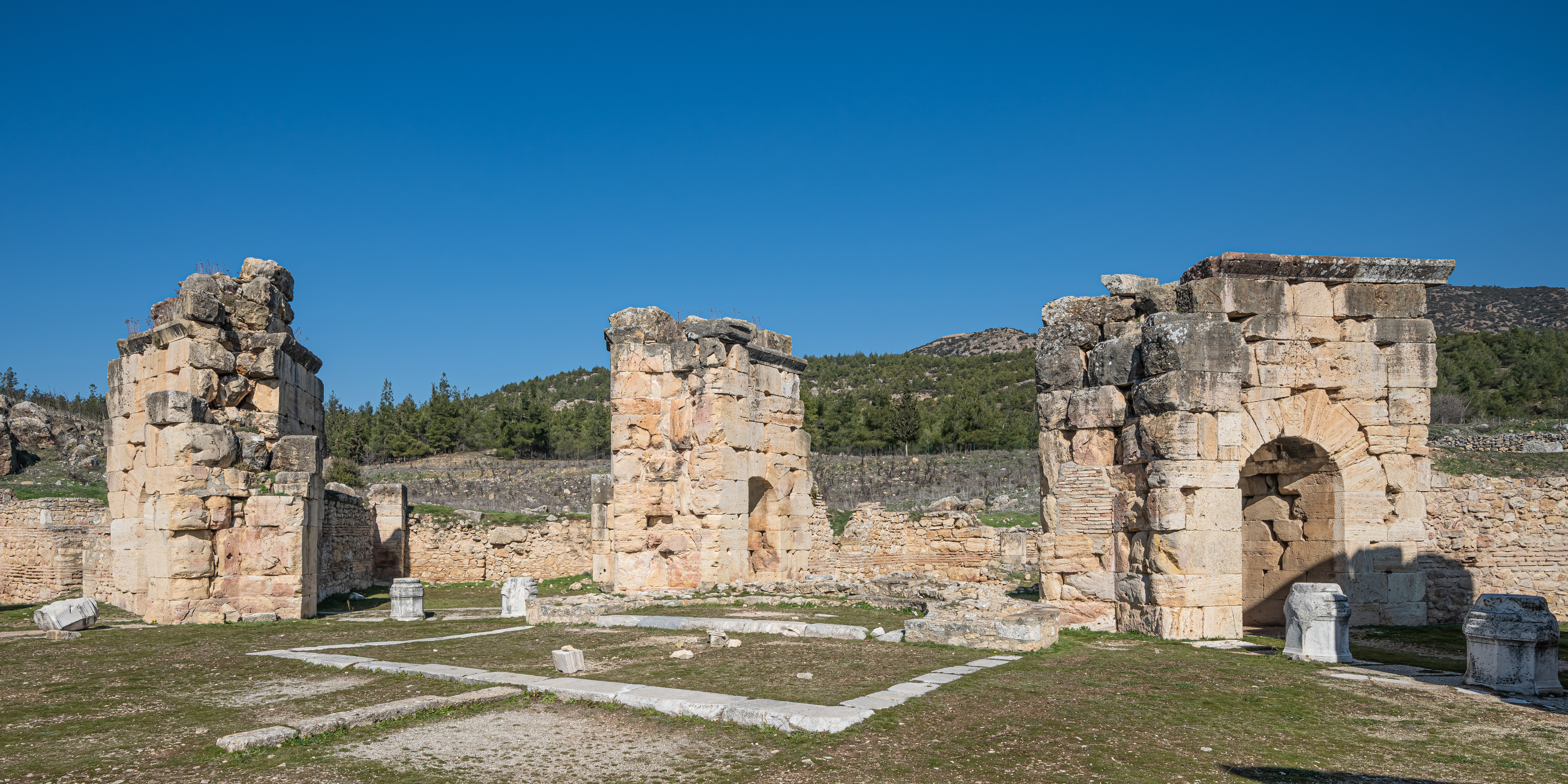
Ruins of the martyrium

The diocese of Hierapolis, was a Christian bishopric in Phrygia (modern central Turkey).

Through the influence of the Christian apostle Paul, a church was founded at Hierapolis while he was at Ephesus. The Christian apostle Philip spent the last years of his life here. The town's martyrium was alleged to have been built upon the spot where Philip was crucified in AD 80. His daughters were also said to have acted as prophetesses in the region.

During the 4th century, Christianity had become the dominant religion and begun suppressing other faiths in the area. A see of the province of Phrygia Pacatiana, the Byzantine emperor Justinian I raised the bishop of Hierapolis to the rank of metropolitan bishop in 531. The city's Roman baths were transformed into a Christian basilica. During the Byzantine period, the city continued to flourish and also remained an important centre for Christianity. Tiberiopolis was a suffragan see.

In 1370, due to its decline, Hierapolis was assumed by the metropolitanate of Kotyaion, and in 1385, by the metropolitanate of Philadelphia.

== Bishops ==
=== Residential bishops ===
- Philip the Apostle
- Papias fl 155AD.
- Apollinaris Claudius (fl. 170)
- Alexander of Hierapolis (fl. 253)
- Abercius II
- Flaccus
- Lucius, attendee at the First Council of Constantinople
- Abeneatius, attendee at the Council of Ephesus
- Stephen, attendee at Council of Ephesus
- Abercius III, attendee at Council of Chalcedon
- Philip
- Auxanon, attendee at the Second Council of Constantinople
- Sisinnius (fl. 680)
- Ignatius (fl. 870)
- Nicon
- Arseber (fl. 997)
- un-named bishop at the Synod of 1066
- George

=== Titular Catholic bishops ===
- Antonio de Alexandria, O.F.M. † (31 Jul 1346 Appointed - 25 May 1349 Appointed, Archbishop of Durrës (Durazzo))
- Johann Ludwig von Windsheim, O.S.A. † (3 Aug 1468 Appointed - 19 Nov 1480 Died)
- Goswin Haex von Loenhout, O. Carm. † (15 May 1469 Appointed - 31 Mar 1475 Died)
- Guillaume Thurin, O.P. † (31 Aug 1478 Appointed - )
- Johann Schlecht, O.S.A. † (10 Sep 1481 Appointed - 31 Jul 1500 Died)
- Fr. Gonçalo de Amorim, O.P. † (19 Jun 1518 Appointed -, 14 June 1518 Appointed, titular Bishop of Titiopolis)
- Vincenzo Scevola, O.P. † (21 May 1528 Appointed - )
- Andrés de Oviedo, S.J. † (23 Jan 1555 Appointed - 22 Dec 1562 Succeeded, Patriarch of Ethiopia)
- João da Rocha, S.J. † (6 Mar 1623 Appointed - )
- Meletiy Smotrytskyi † (5 Jun 1631 Appointed - 6 Jan 1634 Died)
- Antonio Tasca † (26 Dec 1726 Ordained Bishop - 22 Dec 1736 Died)
- Carlo Maria Lomellino † (18 Apr 1742 Appointed - )
- Daniel Murray † (30 Jun 1809 Appointed - 11 May 1823 Succeeded, Archbishop of Dublin)
- Ramón Montero † (13 Mar 1826 Appointed - 15 Mar 1830 Confirmed, Bishop of Coria)
- Paul François Marie Goethals, S.J. † (5 Feb 1878 Appointed - 25 Nov 1886 Appointed, Archbishop of Calcutta)
- Concetto Focaccetti † (23 May 1887 Appointed - 26 Sep 1889 Died)
  - Carolus Aslanian † (23 Sep 1890 Appointed - Jun 1897 Died)
- Julien-François-Pierre Carmené † (24 Mar 1898 Appointed - 23 Aug 1908 Died)
- Louis-François Sueur † (1 Dec 1908 Appointed - 7 Oct 1914 Died)
- Celso Benigno Luigi Costantini (22 Jul 1921 Appointed - 9 Sep 1922 Appointed, Titular Archbishop of Theodosiopolis in Arcadia)
- Louis Couppé, M.S.C. † (18 Dec 1925 Appointed - 20 Jul 1926 Died)
- Alban Goodier, S.J. † (1 Oct 1926 Appointed - 13 Mar 1939 Died)
- Lorenzo Maria Balconi, P.I.M.E. † (3 Aug 1939 Appointed - 10 Apr 1969 Died)
