= Themiso =

Themiso was a late second-century or an early third-century Montanist leader and perhaps the successor of Montanus after the death of Montanus and the woman prophets. Apollinaris of Laodicea mentioned Themiso, saying that he wrote a letter, for which he seemed to have claimed divine inspiration and the authority of the apostles, which was directed towards the wider church, in which he presented Montanist tenets as authoritative. The letter of Themiso along with other Montanist writings, however circulated widely within the sect and were read in services during public worship.

== See also ==
- Blastus
- Miltiades
