= Zoticus of Comana =

Italian Roman Catholic saint

Saint Zoticus

Martyr and Bishop of Comana
- Died: 204
- Venerated in: Roman Catholic Church Eastern Orthodox Church
- Canonized: Pre-congregation
- Feast: 21 July

Zoticus (Greek: Ζωτικός) was a 3rd-century martyr and bishop of Comana (also spelled Conana or Comama). Zoticus is known for his opposition to the Montanist heresy. He died in 204 a martyr. A life of Zoticus, the Vita Zotici, was written during the reign of Michael IV (1034–41). The town of Saint-Zotique, Quebec is named for him, as is Rue St Zotique in Montreal.

== Biography ==
Zoticus of Comana is sometimes identified with Comana in Cappadocia, but other sources dispute this identification, and suggest a Comana in Italy. Zoticus is known for his opposition to the Montanist heresy. Sometime in the 3rd century Bishop Zoticus and Bishop Julian of Apamea went to a town called Pepuza to exorcize demons from Maximilla. While in Papuza they muzzled the followers of Themiso to stop them from spreading falsehood, and Zoticus tried to prove Maximilla why Montanism was wrong. Zoticus' exorcism was stopped by followers of Themiso. Zoticus became a martyr during the persecution of Septimius Severus, around the year 204.
