= Tascodrugites =

Early Christian sect in Galatia

The Tascodrugites (Note: Also anglicized Tascodrogians or Ascodrogians.) (Greek: Τασκοδρούγιται, Taskodrougitai; (Note: The Greek spelling Τασκοδρούγγιται, Taskodroungitai, is sometimes encountered in modern sources, but is not attested.) Latin Tascodrugitae, Tascodrugi) were a sect active in Galatia in the fourth and fifth centuries AD, and possibly as late as the ninth. Ancient sources present them variously as Gnostics or heterodox Christians. Most likely they were Montanists.

== Name ==
The term Tascodrugites is a nickname referring to their custom during prayer to place a finger to the nose or mouth, at the same time observing the profoundest silence. The practice is attested in Epiphanios's Panarion, Augustine's De haeresibus and Philastrius's Diversarum haereseon liber. Epiphanios derives the name from the non-Greek words τασκός, taskos, and δρουγγός, droungos, which he translates in Greek, respectively, as πάσσαλος, passalos, meaning "peg", and ῥύγχος, rhunchos, meaning "snout". He thus makes them identical with the sect called Passalorynchites. Both names mean "peg-noses". Christine Trevett translates it "nose-peggers" or "nose-gaggers"; Frank Williams as "nose-pickers"; (Note: Katz objects to "nose-pickers".) and Philip Amidon as "peg snouts".

The roots taskos and droungos given by Epiphanius are of Celtic origin. They are in fact the only attested Galatian words that are not personal or place names. (Note: There is one other attested Galatian word (ὗς, hus, "kermes oak"), but as it is not of Celtic origin, it is a borrowing into Galatian.) Joshua Katz suggests that Epiphanios erred in his translation and that the first element should be read as Celtic *tasko-, "badger", making the name of the sect mean "badger-snouts". Against the consensus that the roots of Taskodrougitai are Galatian, Paul McKechnie suggests they are Phrygian.

The name sometimes appears without the initial consonant. (Note: For an overview of the primary sources and the variant names, see Holder 1904, cols. 1745–1748.) Jerome in his commentary on Galatians refers to them as Ascodrobi. Philastrius calls them Ascodrugitae and a novel (law) of the Emperor Theodosius II (31 January 438) calls them Ascodrogi. In Theodoret, they are the Ἀσκοδρούτοι, Askodroutoi, and in John of Damascus Ἀσκοδρούπιτοι, Askodroupitoi. (Note: Katz gives Theodoret's spelling as Ἀσκοδρούπιται, Askodroupitai.) Philastrius seems to confuse the Ascodrugitae with the Ascitae mentioned by Augustine. In a folk etymology, he connects their name to Greek ἀσκός, askos (wineskin). Katz suggests a distant relationship to the Hittite word āšku-, meaning "mole". In his view, these phonologically similar words for badger and mole were widely borrowed as a pair into various languages, and sometimes used interchangeably since both referred to [fossorial animals with long noses. In Galatian, the heretics could thus be referred to indiscriminately as "badger-noses" or "mole-noses", giving rise to two similar and interchangeable but etymologically distinct names.

The Passalorynchites (Passalorinchitae, Passalorynchitae) are mentioned by Philastrius, Jerome and Augustine, who proposes the alternative name Dactylorynchitae from Greek δάκτυλος, daktulos, finger.

== Beliefs and practices ==
Theodoret says that the Tascodrugites ridiculed the sacraments (refusing baptism), rejected the creeds and repudiated all divine revelation, including the Bible. He describes them as Gnostics—believing in knowledge as the only means of salvation—and connects them to the Marcosians. Epiphanios, on the other hand, considered them a branch of Montanism, possibly a late manifestation of Quintillianism. They were sometimes charged with denying the incarnation of Christ. They seem to have had a special interest in Revelation. Although sometimes connected with Phrygian paganism, they are better identified as a late sect continuing an apocalyptic tendency more common in early Christianity.

Epiphanios records that the Tascodrugites ritually pricked infants with needles at "a certain feast". This may refer to ritual tattooing or scarification, perhaps in deliberate contradistinction to the "mark of the beast". The habit which gave them their name—finger-to-nose gesture—is labeled by Epiphanios as mere "affected righteousness". It has been interpreted in several ways: as a hand covering the face in contrition during prayer; as a finger over the lips indicating silence; or even as the right hand over the mouth pointing to the forehead to indicate the marks left by the needle.

== History ==
Jerome, who died in 420, lists the Tascodrugites and Passalorynchites side by side, but the terms are synonymous. He lists them with the Artotyrites as examples of heresies that are mere names to his readers but "monstrosities rather than mere names in another part of the Roman world".

The Theodosian Code of 438 preserves two laws condemning the "Tascodrogitae". The first was issued by the Emperors Gratian, Valentinian II and Theodosius I on 20 June 383 at Constantinople. It forbids the Tascodrugites from assembling, but clarifies that they "shall by no means be evicted from their own habitations". The second was issued by Emperors Theodosius II and Valentinian III on 30 May 428. This law lists the Tascodrugites among those sects who were prohibited "the means of assembling anywhere on Roman soil".

Timothy of Constantinople, writing around 600, included the Tascodrugites in his list of heretics. They were placed in the worst of three classes of heretics, those requiring baptism and unction to join the church. Although Timothy includes many extinct heresies in his work, the Tascodrugites are also mentioned in the ninth century by Theodore the Studite, whose list is limited to more active heresies.
