= Miltiades (Christian) =

2nd-century Christian author of treatises

Miltiades was a 2nd-century Christian, who wrote three treatises, "against the Greeks", "against the Jews" and an "Apology". He likely started writing before the death of Marcus Aurelius. Miltiades might have been associated with Montanism, however there is confusion as to if he was a Montanist, this is because In Eusebius' writings, there appears to be confusion over the name "Miltiades" and "Alcibiades", either due to an error from copyists or from Eusebius himself. It is even possible that he might have written against Montanism.

Miltiades is mentioned by Tertullian, Jerome and Eusebius.

== See also ==
- Blastus
- Themiso
