= Dónall Mac Giolla Easpaig =

Academic work
- Discipline: Celtic studies

Dónall Mac Giolla Easpaig, M.A., is the former Chief Placenames Officer in the Placenames Branch in the Department of Community, Equality and Gaeltacht Affairs (An Roinn Gnóthaí Pobail, Comhionannais agus Gaeltachta) in Ireland. He is a leading authority on Irish placenames.

== Select bibliography ==
- "Aspects of variant word order in Early Irish." Ériu 31 (1980). pp. 28–38.
- "Noun + noun compounds in Irish placenames." Études Celtiques 18 (1981). pp. 151–163.
- "Lough Neagh and Tynagh Revisited." Ainm 1 (1986). pp. 14–40.
- "The place-names of Rathlin Island." Ainm 4 (1989). pp. 3–89.
- "Placenames and early settlement in county Donegal." In Donegal: History and Society, edited by William Nolan, Liam Ronayne and Mairéad Dunlevy. Dublin, 1996. pp. 149–182.
- "Breccán Cathe, a forgotten Derry saint." Ainm 7 (1996). pp. 75–88.
- "Dunlewy and Dún Lúiche." Ainm 7 (1996). pp. 105–107.
- "Early Ecclesiastical Settlement Names of County Galway." In Galway: History and Society - Interdisciplinary Essays on the History of an Irish County, edited by Gerard Moran. Dublin, 1996. pp. 795–816. ISBN 0-906602-75-0.
