= Ascitans =

2nd-century Christian sect

The Ascitans (or Ascitae, from the Greek ἀσκός, askos, wineskin) were a peculiar Montanist sect of 2nd century Christians, who produced the practice of dancing around burst wine-skins at their assemblies, saying that they were those new bottles filled with new wine, whereof Jesus makes mention, according to the New American Standard Bible translation, Matthew 9:17:

"Nor do people put new wine into old wineskins; otherwise the wineskins burst, and the wine pours out and the wineskins are ruined; but they put new wine into fresh wineskins, and both are preserved."

Philastrius thought the sect of the Ascodrugites was the same as the Ascitae, but his etymology of the former is false.
