= Prisca (prophet) =

Prophet of an early Christian sect

- Πρίσκα

Personal life
- Born: 2nd century

Religious life
- Religion: Christianity
- Sect: Montanism

Prisca (Greek: Πρίσκα), often written in the diminutive form Priscilla (Greek: Πρίσκιλλα), was a 2nd-century A.D. foundational leader and prophet of the religious movement known today as Montanism based in the Phrygian towns of Pepuza and Tymion. She, along with the prophets Montanus and Maximilla, proselytized a form of Christianity in which the Holy Spirit would enter the human body and speak through it. With the exception of Tertullian, all historical information concerning her life, as well as the movement of which she was inextricably entwined, comes from extremely hostile sources written more than a century after her death. Catholic writers in the 4th century condemned Montanism as a heresy and its female leaders as seductresses.

No information exists concerning her life before her entrance into the movement. In joining the sect she was said to have abandoned her husband. Though the 4th century polemicists portrayed Montanus as the head of the sect, modern scholars debate the extent to which the three prophets shared power. In Epiphanius of Salamis’ Panarion, he subdivided adherents of the New Prophecy into many smaller categories, one of which was Priscillianists. Epiphanius defined a Priscillianist as having particular reverence for Priscilla as a spiritual leader but treated it and Montanism as interchangeable labels. In the early 3rd century, Priscilla likely took over leadership with Quintilla after the deaths of Montanus and Maximilla.

== Bibliography ==
- Burns, J. Patout; Fagin, Gerald M. (1984). The Holy Spirit. Michael Glazier Inc.
- Trevett, Christine (1996). Montanism: Gender, Authority and the New Prophecy. Cambridge University Press.
- Williams, Frank, ed. (2013). The Panarion of Epiphanius of Salamis: Books II and III. De Fide (2nd rev. ed.). Brill.
