= Judas Barsabbas =

Early Christian prophet and leader based in Jerusalem

Disciple, Prophet
- Honored in: Catholic Church; Eastern Orthodox Church; Oriental Orthodox Church

Judas Barsabbas was a New Testament prophet and one of the 'leading men' in the early Christian community in Jerusalem at the time of the Council of Jerusalem in around 50 AD.

== Biblical account ==
He is mentioned in Acts 15:22, where he and Silas are described as a "leading men among the brothers" (NIV). Judas and Silas were delegated the task of accompanying Paul and Barnabas to Antioch and delivering the Council's letter resolving the controversy surrounding gentile circumcision.

Acts 15:32 further describes Judas and Silas as prophets, and says that they "said much to encourage and strengthen the believers." After a stay in Antioch, Judas returned to Jerusalem whereas Silas remained in Antioch.

== See also ==
- Acts 15
- Joseph Barsabbas
- Judas
- Barabbas
