= Lampetianism =

Christian sect

Lampetianism was a Christian sect, originating with Lampetius, a Cappadocian who lived in Egypt around the fifth century and went to Constantinople. Lampetius was influenced by Origen, with whom he shared an interpretation of scripture. Theodore bar Konai claims that Lampetius loved gold and taught an Epicurian, or hedonistic lifestyle, wherein piety and pleasure were connected. For this he disparaged monks who wore black instead of white, and called his detractors "weak and imperfect". He taught his followers to despise fasting, vigil, the ascetic life, virginity, and bodily purity, and claimed that one who has become worthy of incorruptibility does not need to be justified by such practices.

Aside from this, John of Damascus reports on Lampetians. He writes:

They allow each individual to follow whatever state of life he may wish and deem fit, whether it be to live in common and lead the cenobitic life or to assume the monastic habit of his choosing. For, they say, the Christian does nothing under compulsion, because it is written: I will freely sacrifice to thee, and again, With my will I will give praise to Him. And, as some say, they permit the endurance of physical sufferings without resistance, on the ground that this is nature’s due. They are also said to hold other things which very much resemble those held by those who are called Aerians. (One of their number was a certain Eustathius, from whom come the Eustathians.)
