= Oded (prophet) =

Prophet in the Hebrew Bible

Oded (Hebrew: עוֹדֵד ‘Ōḏêḏ) is a prophet in the Hebrew Bible, mentioned in 2 Chronicles 28. He was from Samaria, and met the army of the northern kingdom of Israel, who were returning with captives from Judah. In a speech from verse 9 to verse 11, he urged them to return the slaves. He was joined in this plea by some of the northern kingdom's leaders (verses 12–13), and it was successful. The slaves were escorted back to Jericho (verse 15) after being clothed, fed, anointed and some of them put on donkeys.

The leaders, certain chiefs of the Ephraimites, were Azariah son of Johanan, Berechiah son of Meshillemoth, Jehizkiah son of Shallum, and Amasa son of Hadlai, who said, "You shall not bring the captives in here, for you propose to bring on us guilt against the Lord in addition to our present sins and guilt. For our guilt is already great, and there is fierce wrath against Israel." This episode has been compared to the story of the Good Samaritan.

William Schniedewind notes that Oded is the only prophet in the Book of Chronicles who does not address a king. Schniedewind argues that this is because "in the Chronicler's view there was no legitimate northern king to address".

A different Oded is mentioned in 2 Chronicles 15, as being the father of the prophet Azariah.
