= Daniel Obinim =

Ghanaian religious group leader (born 1977)

- Born: August 29, 1977 (age 48)
- Other names: Bishop Obinim, Angel Obinim

Daniel Obinim (born 29 August 1977), also known as Angel Obinim, is a minister of the International God's Way Church in Ghana.

== Early life ==
Obinim was born on 29 August 1977 in Ghana

== Controversies ==
=== Stepping on Woman's Belly ===
In 2014, Obinim was seen on television stepping on the belly of a woman in a "deliverance" This led the Amnesty International in Ghana to call for his prosecution for assault.

=== Declarations ===
Daniel Obinim has made several public controversial declarations. He declared he was an angel of God, which led to the name "Angel Obinim" given to him by his church. He also seemed to have conjured a passport for a church member who lost his. In 2016, he told his church he could transform himself and others into objects and animals. Jon Benjamin, the British High Commissioner to Ghana, ridiculed him for these claims over Twitter.

=== 2016 flogging case ===
Obinim, in August 2016, publicly flogged two teenagers, one of whom was pregnant, on live television, accusing them of fornicating and conspiring to abort a pregnancy, leading to public outcry, after the video also went viral on social media. Ghana's Minister of Gender, Children, and Social Protection Nana Oye Lithur herself led a campaign for his arrest, by lodging a complaint to the Ghana Police Service Domestic Violence and Victims’ Support Unit (DOVVSU). He was subsequently arrested.

Following the arrest, hundreds of his church members besieged the police station where he was held to demand his release, a move that was seen to be the first of its kind involving a religious leader. They also threatened not to vote for the current government in Ghana's upcoming election in December 2016 if Obinim is not released. The protesters were dispersed with a water cannon.

== Personal life ==
Obinim is a Christian and married to Ghanaian gospel musician, Florence Obinim.

== See also ==
- Christianity in Ghana
