= Eumeneia =

Town of ancient Phrygia in Turkey

Coordinates: 38°19′33″N 29°51′02″E

Eumeneia or Eumenia (Ancient Greek: Εὐμένεια) was a town of ancient Phrygia, situated on the river Glaucus, on the road from Dorylaeum to Apameia. It is said to have received its name from Attalus II, who named the town after his brother and predecessor, Eumenes II. As of the 19th century, ruins and curious sculptures still marked the place as the site of an ancient town. On some coins found there we read Εὐμενέων Ἀχαίων, which seems to allude to the destruction of Corinth, at which the troops of Attalus were present. The district of the town bore the name Eumenetica Regio, mentioned by Pliny the Elder. It was inhabited during Hellenistic, Roman, and Byzantine times; for a time it also bore the name Fulvia.

It was the seat of a bishop; no longer a residential bishopric, under the name Eumenia. It remains a titular see of the Roman Catholic Church.

Its site is located near Işıklı in Asiatic Turkey.
