= Montanism =

2nd-century Christian movement

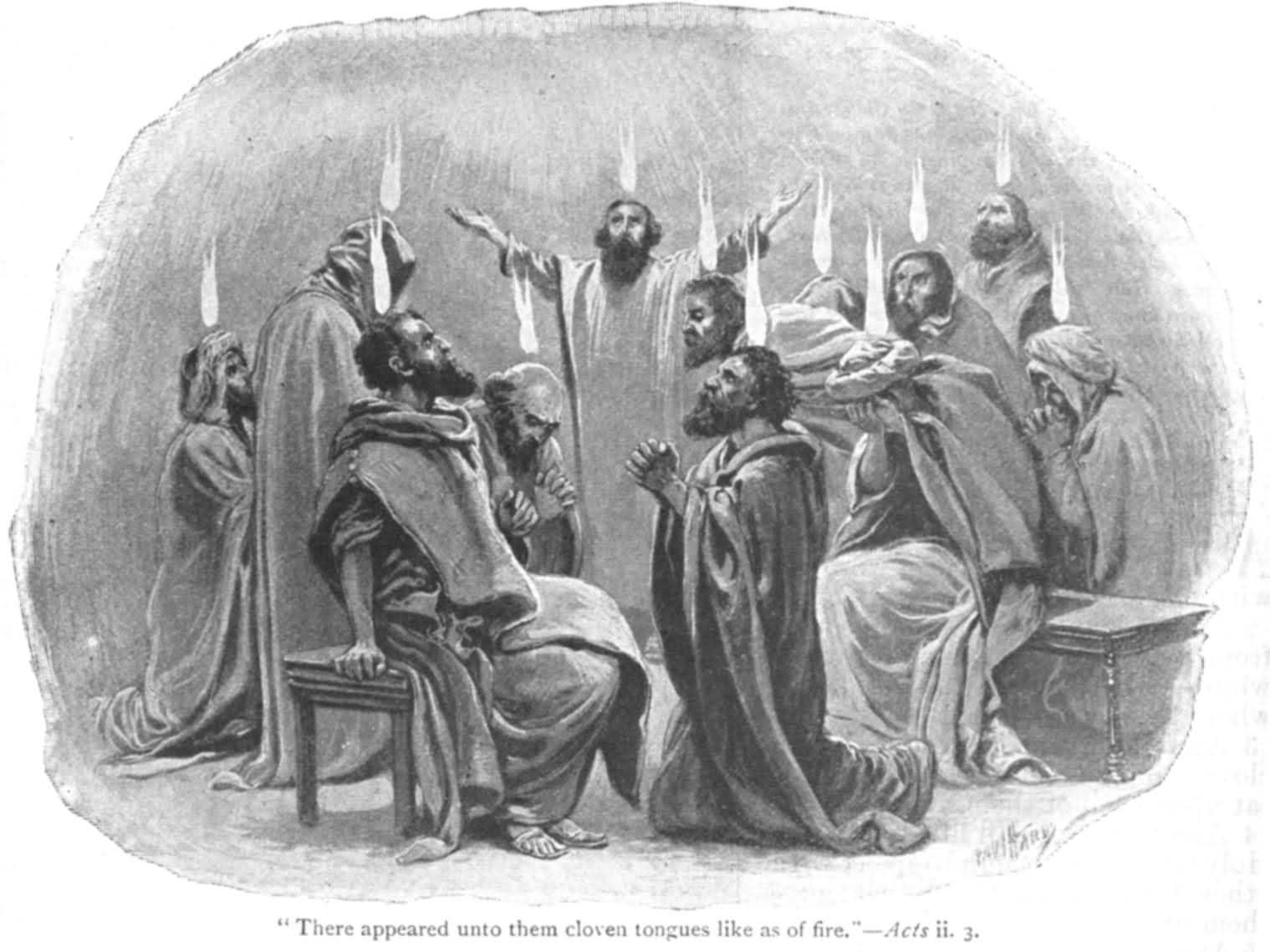
The Apostles receiving the Paraclete in Acts. Montanus, the founder of Montanism, claimed to have also received the Paraclete.

Montanism (/ˈmɒntəˌnɪzəm/), known by its adherents as the New Revelation, was an early Christian movement of the mid-to-late 2nd century, later referred to by the name of its founder, Montanus. Montanism held views about the basic tenets of Christian theology similar to those of the wider Christian Church, but it was labelled a heresy for its belief in new prophetic figures. The prophetic movement called for a reliance on the spontaneity of the Holy Spirit and a more conservative personal ethic.

Montanism originated in Phrygia, a province of Anatolia, and flourished throughout the region, leading to the movement being referred to elsewhere as Cataphrygian (meaning it was "from Phrygia") or simply as Phrygian. They were sometimes also called Pepuzians after the town of Pepuza, which they regarded as the new Jerusalem. Sometimes the Pepuzians were distinguished from other Montanists for despising those not living in the new Jerusalem. The Montanist movement spread rapidly to other regions in the Roman Empire before Christianity was generally tolerated or became legal following the Edict of Serdica in 311. It persisted in some isolated places into the 6th century.

The Montanists did not want to separate themselves from the wider Christian Church, and the Christian theologian Tertullian even recorded an event where a bishop almost declared Montanism as orthodox, albeit changing his mind later. Some contemporary Christian theologians have drawn parallels between Montanism and modern-day Protestant movements, such as the Charismatic movement, as well as Pentecostalism (including Oneness Pentecostalism).

== History ==
Scholars debate as to when Montanus first began his prophetic activity, having chosen dates varying from c. AD 135 to as late as AD 177. Montanus was a recent convert when he first began prophesying, supposedly during the proconsulate of Gratus in a village in Mysia named Ardabau; no proconsul and village so named have been identified, however. Some accounts claim that before his conversion to Christianity, Montanus was a priest of Apollo or Cybele. (Note: Claim made in Dialogue Between a Montanist and an Orthodox (4.4) and possibly alluded to by St. Jerome) He believed he was a prophet of God and that the Paraclete spoke through him.

Montanus proclaimed the towns of Pepuza and Tymion in west-central Phrygia as the site of the New Jerusalem, making the larger—Pepuza—his headquarters. Phrygia as a source for this new movement was not arbitrary. Hellenization was slow to take root in Phrygia, unlike many of the surrounding eastern regions of the Roman Empire. This sense of difference, while simultaneously having easy access to the rest of the Mediterranean Christian world, encouraged the foundation of this separate sect of Christianity.

Montanus had two female colleagues, Prisca (sometimes called Priscilla, the diminutive form of her name) and Maximilla, who likewise claimed the inspiration of the Holy Spirit. Their popularity even exceeded Montanus' own. "The Three" spoke in ecstatic visions and urged their followers to fast and to pray, so that they might share these revelations. Their followers claimed they received the prophetic gift from the prophets Quadratus and Ammia of Philadelphia, figures believed to have been part of a line of prophetic succession stretching all the way back to Agabus (1st century AD) and to the daughters of Philip the Evangelist. In time, the New Prophecy spread from Montanus's native Phrygia across the Christian world, to Africa and to Gaul.

The response to the New Prophecy split the Christian communities, and the proto-orthodox clergy mostly fought to suppress it. Opponents believed that evil spirits possessed the Phrygian prophets, and both Maximilla and Priscilla were the targets of failed exorcisms. The churches of Asia Minor pronounced the prophecies profane, and excommunicated New Prophecy adherents. Around 177, Apollinarius, Bishop of Hierapolis, presided over a synod which condemned the New Prophecy. The leaders of the churches of Lyons and Vienne in Gaul responded to the New Prophecy in 177. Their decision was communicated to the churches in Asia and Pope Eleuterus, but it is not known what this consisted of, only that it was "prudent and most orthodox". It is likely they called for moderation in dealing with the movement.

There was real doubt at Rome, and its bishop (either Eleuterus or Victor I) even wrote letters in support of Montanism, although he was later persuaded by Praxeas to recall them. In 193, an anonymous writer found the church at Ancyra in Galatia torn in two, and opposed the "false prophecy" there.

Eventually, Montanist teachings came to be regarded as heresy by the orthodox Great Church for a number of reasons. The clash of basic beliefs between the movement's proponents and the greater Christian world was likely enough for such conflict to occur. Additionally, in the opinion of anti-Montanists, the movement's penchant for dramatic public displays by its adherents brought unwanted attention to the still fledgling religion. Thus, fears concerning the appearance of Montanist practices to their non-Christian rulers fueled anti-Montanist sentiment. The imperial government carried out sporadic executions of Christians under the reign of Marcus Aurelius, circa AD 161–180, which coincides with the spread of Montanism.

There is no clear evidence as to what happened to Montanus. One of the most widespread stories at the time, as stated by an anonymous associate of Apollinarius, is that he hanged himself, as did Maximilla, although he does not exclude the possibility of them dying some other way.

There was never a uniform excommunication of New Prophecy adherents, and in many places they maintained their standing within the orthodox community. This was the case at Carthage. While not without tension, the church there avoided schism over the issue. There were women prophesying at Carthage, and prophecy was considered a genuine charism. It was the responsibility of the council of elders to test all prophecy and to determine genuine revelation. Tertullian, undoubtedly the best-known defender of the New Prophecy, believed that the claims of Montanus were genuine beginning c. 207. He believed in the validity of the New Prophecy and admired the movement's discipline and ascetic standards. Debates continue as to whether Tertullian decisively left the orthodox Church and joined a separate Montanist sect or remained an early proto-orthodox Christian.

Although what became the orthodox Christian Church prevailed against Montanism within a few generations, inscriptions in the Tembris valley of northern Phrygia, dated between 249 and 279, openly proclaim allegiance to the New Prophecy. Speros Vryonis considers these inscriptions remarkable in that they are the only set of inscriptions which openly reveal the religious affiliations of the deceased before the period of toleration, when Christians dared not to do so. In the 3rd century, a new prophetess appeared in Pepuza, Quintilla. Her followers, the Quintillians, were regarded as an important Montanist sect into the 5th century.

A letter of Jerome to Marcella, written in 385, refutes the claims of Montanists that had been troubling her. A group of "Tertullianists" may have continued at Carthage. The anonymous author of Praedestinatus records that a preacher came to Rome in 388 where he made many converts and obtained the use of a church for his congregation on the grounds that the martyrs to whom it was dedicated had been Montanists. He was obliged to flee after the victory of Theodosius I.

In his own time, Augustine (354–430) records that the Tertullianist group had dwindled to almost nothing and, finally, was reconciled to the church and handed over its basilica. It is not certain whether these Tertullianists were in all respects "Montanist" or not. In 530 Emperor Justinian expelled Montanist clergy from Constantinople. In 550, on the orders of Justinian, John of Ephesus led an expedition to Pepuza to destroy the Montanist shrine there, which was based on the tombs of Montanus, Priscilla and Maximilla.

A Montanist sect in Galatia, the Tascodrugites, is attested around 600 by Timothy of Constantinople and in the 9th century by Theodore the Studite. A sect called "Montanist" existed in the 8th century; the Emperor Leo III ordered the conversion and baptism of its members. These Montanists refused, locked themselves in their houses of worship, set the buildings on fire and perished.

== Beliefs ==
Because much of what is known about Montanism comes from anti-Montanist sources, it is difficult to know what they actually believed and how those beliefs differed from the Christian mainstream of the time. The New Prophecy was also a diverse movement, and what Montanists believed varied by location and period. Montanism was particularly influenced by Johannine literature, especially the Gospel of John and the Apocalypse of John (also known as the book of Revelation).

In John's Gospel, Jesus promises to send the Paraclete (Holy Spirit) after his death, from which Montanists believed their prophets derived inspiration. In the Apocalypse, John was taken by an angel to the top of a mountain, upon which he saw the New Jerusalem descend to Earth. Montanus identified this mountain as being located in Phrygia near Pepuza. Followers of the New Prophecy called themselves spiritales ("spiritual people") in contrast to their opponents, whom they termed psychici ("carnal, natural people").

=== Ecstatic prophecy ===
Montanism, as suggested by the name "New Prophecy," was a movement centered on the prophecies of its founders, believed to convey the Holy Spirit's revelation for the current age. Prophecy itself was not controversial within 2nd-century Christian communities. However, the New Prophecy, as described by Eusebius of Caesarea, departed from nascent Christian tradition:

And he [Montanus] became beside himself, and being suddenly in a sort of frenzy and ecstasy, he raved, and began to babble and utter strange things, prophesying in a manner contrary to the constant custom of the Church handed down by tradition from the beginning.

— Eusebius of Caesarea

According to opponents, the Montanist prophets did not speak as messengers of God; instead, they believed they became fully possessed by God and spoke as God. A prophetic utterance by Montanus described this possessed state: "Lo, the man is as a lyre, and I fly over him as a pick. The man sleepeth, while I watch." Thus, the Phrygians were seen as false prophets because they acted irrationally and did not control their senses.

A criticism of Montanism was that its followers claimed their revelation, received directly from the Holy Spirit, could supersede the authority of Jesus, Paul the Apostle, or anyone else. In some of his prophecies, Montanus apparently—and somewhat like the oracles of the Greco-Roman world—spoke in the first person as God: "I am the Father and the Son and the Holy Spirit."

Early Christians likely interpreted Montanus as claiming to be God. However, scholars agree that he exemplified a common practice among religious prophets who spoke as mouthpieces of the divine, echoing phrases like "Thus saith the Lord." This practice was observed in both Christian and pagan contexts.

=== Other beliefs ===
Other beliefs and practices (or alleged beliefs and practices) of Montanism are as follows:

- In On the Resurrection of the Flesh, Tertullian wrote that the Holy Spirit, through the New Prophecy, cleared up the ambiguities of scripture. The new prophecies did not contain new doctrinal content, but mandated strict ethical standards. To the mainstream Christian, Montanists appeared to believe that the new prophecies superseded and fulfilled the doctrines proclaimed by the apostles in the New Testament.
- The Montanists were alleged to have believed in the power of apostles and prophets to forgive sins. Adherents also believed that Christian martyrs and confessors possessed this power. The mainstream church believed that God forgave sins through bishops and presbyters (and those martyrs recognized by legitimate ecclesiastical authority).
- Montanists recognized women as bishops and presbyters.
- Women and girls were forbidden to wear ornaments, and virgins were required to wear veils.
- There was a divide between trinitarian and monarchian Montanists, though beliefs coexisted.
- An emphasis on ethical rigorism and asceticism. These included prohibitions against remarriage following divorce or the death of a spouse. They also emphasized keeping fasts strictly and added new fasts.
- Montanus provided salaries for those who preached his doctrine, which orthodox writers claimed was promoting gluttony.
- Some of the Montanists were also "Quartodeciman" ("fourteeners"), preferring to celebrate Easter on the Hebrew calendar date of 14 Nisan, regardless of what day of the week it landed on. Mainstream Christians held that Easter should be commemorated on the Sunday following 14 Nisan. However, uniformity in this matter had not yet been fully achieved when the Montanist movement began; Polycarp, for example, was a quartodeciman, and Irenaeus convinced Victor, then Bishop of Rome, to refrain from making the issue of the date of Easter a divisive one. Later, the Catholic Church established a fixed way of calculating Easter according to the Julian, and later, the Gregorian, calendar.
- Montanists believed in premillennialism.
- That the Lapsi could not be restored to fellowship.
- Ecstatic form of worship.
- Limited distinction between the laity and the clergy.
- Discouragement of infant baptism.

=== Geographical differences ===
North African Montanism and the form of Montanism practiced in Anatolia may have had differences. The Montanists in North Africa believed that the New Testament was the supreme rule of Christian life and theology; that bishops were successors of the apostles; and held similar theology to the Great Church, while Montanus himself had different views.

== Opponents ==
Origen addresses Montanism not as a heretical movement, but as those who are "the simple" among believers.

== See also ==
- Apostolic-Prophetic Movement
- Artotyrite
- Ascitans
- Charismatic Christianity
- Council of Iconium
- Pentecostalism
- Testament of Job
- Thraseas

== Bibliography ==
- Jerome (385), Schaff (ed.), To Marcella (Letter), CCEL
- Labriolle, Pierre (1913), La Crise Montaniste (in French), Paris: Leroux.
- Lieu, Samuel N. C. (1999). Manichaeism in Mesopotamia and the Roman East (2nd ed.). Leiden: Brill.
- Mitchell, Stephen (2005). "An Apostle to Ankara from the New Jerusalem: Montanists and Jews in Late Roman Asia Minor". Scripta Classica Israelica. 24: 207–223. doi:10.71043/sci.v24i.3477.
- Pelikan, Jaroslav (1956), "Montanism and Its Trinitarian Significance", Church History, 25 (2), Cambridge University Press: 99–109, doi:10.2307/3161195, JSTOR 3161195, S2CID 162580581.
- Tabbernee, William (2009), Prophets and Gravestones: An Imaginative History of Montanists and Other Early Christians, Peabody, MA: Hendrickson, ISBN 978-1-56563-937-9.
- Trevett, Christine (1996), Montanism: Gender, Authority and the New Prophecy, Cambridge: Cambridge University Press, ISBN 0-521-41182-3
- Thonemann, Peter, ed. (2013), Roman Phrygia: Culture and Society, Cambridge: Cambridge University Press, ISBN 978-1-107-03128-9
