= Archdiocese of Tuam =

Archdiocese of Tuam may refer to:

- Roman Catholic Archdiocese of Tuam, a Roman Catholic archdiocese in Connacht, Ireland
- Archdiocese of Tuam (Church of Ireland), a former archdiocese that lasted until 1839
- Diocese of Tuam, Limerick and Killaloe, later successor to the Church of Ireland archdiocese
