= Cloonfush =

Village in County Galway, Ireland

Coordinates: 53°30′55″N 8°53′45″W

Cloonfush (Irish: Cluain Fois, meaning 'lawn/meadow of the stay/rest') is a townland and village located approximately two miles (3.2 km) from Tuam in County Galway, Ireland. It is substantially surrounded by River Clare, which flows into the Corrib. Adjacent villages are Kilmore, Sylane, and Killaloonty.

== Location ==
Cloonfush is accessed via the main N17 at Clashroe, and is a cul-de-sac single-lane road. The village of Kilmore is reached first, then Cloonfush approximately 0.62 miles (1 km) later. There is no separation between the two villages today, as houses now line the road almost over its complete length through both villages. The road leading through the village was finally surfaced in the 1950s, with the last 400 m (1,300 ft) remaining with a grass strip in the middle until the early 1980s. There is a peat bog to the south of the village, used predominantly by the inhabitants of both Cloonfush and Kilmore for harvesting turf, which is used as a solid fuel for domestic heating.

== Facilities ==
Cloonfush has no church, shops, schools or other infrastructural amenities. The inhabitants are therefore dependent on the neighbouring town of Tuam and the city of Galway for these services.

Until the late 1960s, there was no mains water supply to the village, with each household dependent on obtaining water from the hand water pump located in the village. A local committee was formed and a borehole was sunk near the old hand pump location. A pump house was erected over the borehole. A network of pipes was laid in trenches along the roadside and each house in turn connected. Once commissioned, this system provided fresh clean water to the villages of Kilmore and Cloonfush for almost four decades. Regular independent analysis of the water confirmed its potability. In the early 2000s, the pump house and pipe work were finally abandoned when the network was connected to the mains water supply by Galway County Council.

Various travelling shops served the area over the years. The last such service ceased in the late 1970s.

== History ==
Cloonfush was the location of an abbey where St Jarlath was abbot, the ruins of which still exist, some 1,600 years later. The adjacent graveyard (cemetery) is still in use, and since the year 2000 is the location of an annual mass on 6 June, the feast day of St Jarlath.

Cloonfush also features in Griffith's Valuation (Tuam Area) of 1848–1864. The Higgins, Crisham (sp: Cresham) and Roche names can still be found in the village, whilst descendants of Bermingham (Fleming) are still living in the village.

== See also ==
- List of towns and villages in Ireland
