= Oded, father of Azariah =

Father of Azariah the prophet

Oded is a figure in the Hebrew Bible mentioned in 2 Chronicles 15. He is mentioned in verse 1 as the father of Azariah the prophet, whose speech to King Asa of Judah initiates reforms in the religious life of the kingdom of Judah. The Masoretic Text omits Azariah's name in verse 8, suggesting that the prophecy is from Oded himself, but the Syriac version, the Latin Vulgate and modern translations like the New International Version refer to "Azariah the son of Oded" in this verse.

The third century BCE Septuagint translation has Ὠδήδ (Oded) in verse 1 but Ἀδὰδ (Adad) in verse 8.

In the Talmud, Oded is also listed as a prophet.

A different Oded is mentioned in 2 Chronicles 28.
