= Azariah (prophet) =

Biblical prophet credited with persuading King Asa of Judah to carry out reforms

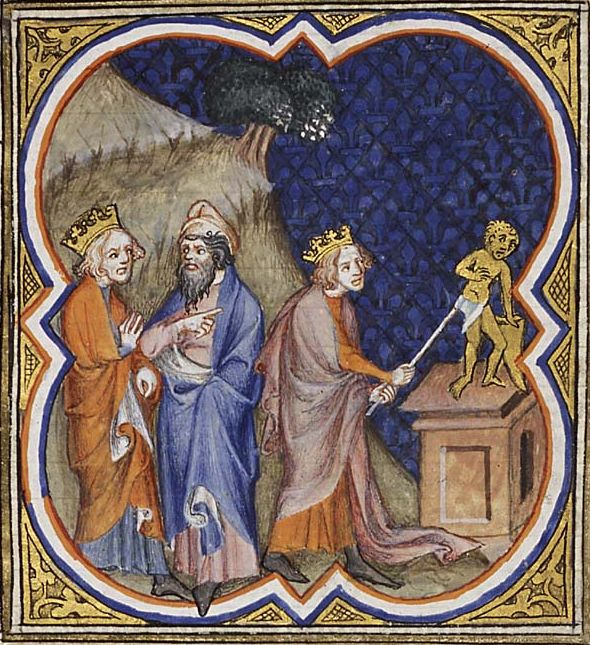
Illustration in the Bible Historiale of King Asa of Judah destroying the idols, at Azariah's instigation.

Azariah (Hebrew: עֲזַרְיָה ‘Ǎzaryā, "Yah has helped") was a prophet described in 2 Chronicles 15.

== Biblical narrative ==
A minor prophet, Azariah is mentioned only in a brief but dense description in the Books of Chronicles of the Holy Scriptures, 2 Chronicles 15:1-8. It comes immediately after King Asa of Judah has defeated the Egyptian/ Ethiopian King Zerah in a battle (2 Chronicles 14:9–15).

The Spirit of God is described as coming upon him (2 Chronicles, chapter 15, verse 1), and he goes to meet King Asa of Judah to exhort him to carry out a work of reform. Based upon the context, Azariah is not a full-time prophet, but rather a part-time one, for "only those who were part-time had the spirit of God call upon them for a particular assignment." He is a layperson, or adjunct prophet, albeit "sufficiently spiritually-minded that God saw fit to call him and use him in this one instance to bring a word of encouragement to Asa" and his people.

Azariah "goes out" to meet King Asa (verse 2). He calls on the King and "all Judah and Benjamin", using the plural, which is important theologically, for God's word is not only to the elite and leaders, but democratically to all the people. First, Azariah calls them all to listen, (verse 2), and then gives "a sort of historical review" or "documentary evidence" of his theology, especially from verse 2, part 2 (verses 3-6). The axioms of this theology is threefold:

1. The Lord "is with you when you are with him"; (see 1 Chron. 22:18, 2 Chron. 15:2, 14-15)
2. If you believe and seek Him out, then "he will let himself be found"; (see 1 Chron. 28:19, 2 Chron. 15:2, 4, 15) and
3. Yet "if you forsake him, he will forsake you" (see 1 Chron. 28:9, 2 Chron. 12:5, 15:2, 24:20). This last negative part echoes Zechariah 8:10.

In response to Azariah's encouragement, Asa carried out a number of reforms including the destruction of idols and repairs to the altar of Yahweh in the Jerusalem Temple complex (verses 8 and 15). The Bible records that a period of peace followed the carrying out of these reforms (verse 19).

There is an issue of Textual criticism in the description. Azariah is described as being the "son of Oded" (verse 1), but the Masoretic Text omits Azariah's name in verse 8, suggesting that either the prophecy is from Oded himself, or more likely, a transcription error crept into some manuscripts, which left out that Azariah was the son of Oded.
