= Alexander of Hierapolis (Phrygia) =

3rd-century Bishop of Hierapolis and writer

Alexander of Hierapolis (Greek: Ἀλέξανδρος; fl. 253 AD) was a bishop of Hierapolis in Phrygia (modern Pamukkale, Turkey).

Alexander was the author of a book entitled On the new things introduced by Christ into the world (τί καινὸν εἰσήνεγκε Χριστός εἰς τὸν κόσμον. κεφ. θ'), which is no longer extant.
