= John Bull (prophet) =

English self-proclaimed prophet

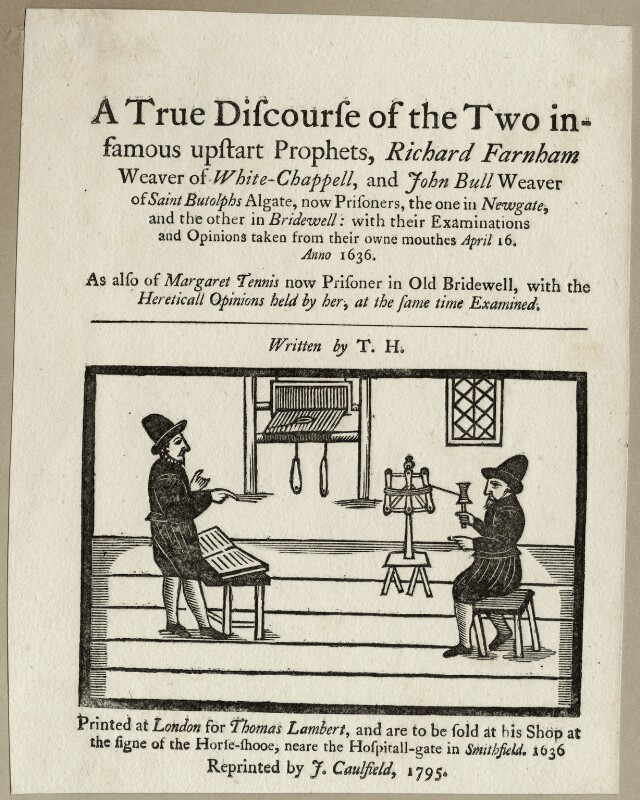
Thomas Heywood, A True Discourse of the Two infamous upstart Prophets (1636). A contemporary pamphlet on Bull and Farnham, with a woodprint of the "two infamous upstart prophets".

John Bull (bur. 14 January 1642) was an English self-proclaimed prophet who claimed to be one of the two witnesses of the Book of Revelation, alongside Richard Farnham. Through the late 1630s and early 1640s, they established a small religious following surrounding their prophesies.

Originating from Colchester, and working as a weaver in London, Bull first came to the attention of the authorities in a crackdown on the "sectaries or schismatiques" of London, in early 1636. As members of a private conventicle and religious dissenters, both Farnham and Bull were arrested and interrogated on 16 April. With both men imprisoned, pamphleteer Thomas Heywood recorded their outlandish views in a 1636 tract, with the supposed prophets claiming to have power over the elements, and that it was their fate to be "slaine at Hierusalem" and "rise again". Sensational literature surrounded the pair, and often emphasized their reputed group of female followers.

Bull petitioned Archbishop William Laud for his case to be heard at trial in 1638, but was not released until before 1641. By 1641, Bull was sick with the plague and, contrary to their prophesies, both prophets died in January 1644. After Bull's death, and in absence of their prophesied resurrection, Farnham and Bull's small group of followers claimed they had risen, and were converting the ten tribes of Israel, after which they would "reign forever". With their following diminishing, Bull and Farnham's lives served as fodder for pamphleteers during the subsequent years of religious tumult.

== Early life ==
John Bull is an uncertain figure, and little is known of his life before his claimed prophethood. Ariel Hessayon, writing for the Oxford Dictionary of National Biography, has used the scant evidence to construct a narrative of his early life. He possibly originated from Colchester, Essex, as two locals in the 1630s were later recorded as knowing him. Biographer of Farnham, John Walter, notes that Farnham had also come from Colchester, as a 1642 pamphlet asserts. Hessayon considers it equally possible that he either became proficient as a weaver here or learned his trade in London, where he later resided, although no freeman by Bull's name was accepted into London's Worshipful Company of Weavers between 1600 and 1646.

== Arrest and imprisonment ==
By early 1636, Bull was working as a weaver in St Botolph without Aldgate, when a complaint was made concerning the "sectaries or schismatiques" of London. The king's commissioners for causes ecclesiastical had been notified that throughout London, and in many other places, "there are at this present [...] sundrie sorts of Separatists and sectaries, as namely Brownists, Anabaptists, Arrians, Thraskists, Famalists, Sensualists, Antinomians, and some other sorts". On 20 February 1636, John Wragg, a messenger of majesty's chamber, was tasked by the commissioners with entering any places where "privat Conventicles or meetings" were suspected and rooting out "seditious and unlawfull writings and papers", utilising "all other his highnes officers ministers and subjects whatsoever" in his search. At this time, Bull and Farnham seemed to be members of one such "privat Conventicle" together, as the Puritan author Rose Thurgood, in her "A Lecture of Repentance" records that she "reasoned with my brothers Richard Farnam [sic] & John Bull concerning prayer". Bull and Farnham confronted her and

asked if ever God heard my prayers: yea that hee hath said I to them; For I prayed for my husbands health, and that (I thanke God for his love) hee graunted mee; also I prayed for the life of my Children and that I had; Then I prayed that my husband might amend his life, and so hee was somewhat amended (as I thought) for my praying. The[n] my brothers told mee, that God heard none of my prayers; what none of my prayers (said I to them). Noe none of my prayers, said they to mee; For what you received it was of Gods mercy towards you, and nottfor your praying [...] Then said I to them, you shall never make mee believe that, but God heard my prayers; so home I came, very angry I was with them, to thinke how hott they were against mee for my praying.

According to Naomi Baker, a prominent scholar of Thurgood's work, this position reflected a radical Calvinist belief in the "death of the self", as the agency of individual believers is erased for that of God alone. After her initial outrage at these radical teachings, Thurgood came to accept Farnham and Bull as spiritual advisors, and Baker has speculated on a later personal connection with the two, as Farnham's wife, Elizabeth Addington, has been proposed as the scribe of Thurgood's lecture.

There bee many false reports that goe of mee in the City of London, and I beleeve they are spread abroad in the Countrey. [...] But these things you may report to be truths from my own handwriting: I say, I am one of those two witnesses that are spoken of in the 11 of the Revelation, and that the Lord hath given mee power for the opening and the shutting of the Heavens.

— Richard Farnham's testimony in Heywood's True Discourse, taken 16 April 1636.

Bull and Farnham were arrested via Wragg's warrant and examined on 16 April 1636. The year of their arrest, a pamphlet was published by Thomas Heywood, entitled A True Discourse of the Two infamous upstart Prophets (1636), concerning Bull and Farnham, now imprisoned. The pamphlet recorded the "examinations and opinions" of the two, taken on 16 April. Heywood observed Bull was "besotted with the like Lunacy [to Farnham], constantly affirmeth also that he is a Prophet: and one of these two witnesses before spoken of, in all things agreeing with his brother Farnham, and that hee shall also be slaine at Hierusalem where Christ suffered, and shall rise againe." They apparently held that "their prayer [...] can command the clouds to showre downe raine", and that, despite speaking only poor English, they "shall be inspired with the Holy Tongue" at Jerusalem and "be able to speake all Tongues and Languages". Bull and Farnham's tale was apparently widespread enough that Farnham felt the need for his own testimony of his beliefs, dispelling rumours that he had claimed to be the Second Coming of Christ, and instead asserting that he and Bull were the "two witnesses" of Revelation 11:3, who, the Book of Revelation recorded, would "prophesy a thousand two hundred and threescore days, clothed in sackcloth". Heywood was hostile to Bull's prophesies, observing they seemed "to smell of the Sect of the Thraskites and Sabbatarians", and entreating the reader to "pitty their ignorance" and "wondrest at their impudence".

Bull was imprisoned on 4 May 1636, residing in Bridewell Prison, where Farnham joined him in 1638, after brief stints at Newgate Prison and Bedlam. In 1638, after apparently enduring months of hard labour, he petitioned Archbishop of Canterbury, William Laud to be brought to trial, protesting the "labour of beating hemp, to the afflicting of his weak body, and the being companion of all manner of rogues, to the vexation of his soul", and beseech him that "if he be a false prophet, it is your duty to deal with him as the word of God requires". Farnham wrote similar petitions, successively soliciting the help of Archbishop Laud, the Privy Council, and the King of England, Charles I.

== Release, death and legacy ==
An anonymous and posthumous newsbook biography of the two, False prophets discovered (1642), reports that at some point after their imprisonment, Bull had "gone abroad at his pleasure" while Farnham grew sick. By December 1641, Bull too was reportedly "shut upp in an house visited with the sicknes". By 1642, Bull, Farnham, and a Richard Curtains, were living together in "Curtains house in Rosemary lane". Contrary to their prophesies, both men would die here. Farnham died and was buried on 4 January 1642, met with accounts from Bull and three of their female followers, three days later, that he had been resurrected. John Bull was buried ten days later, on 14 January 1642, at St Mary Matfelon. Hessayon speculates that, shortly before his death, Bull was baptised by a follower of the separatist Henry Jacob.

After both prophets' death, and in absence of the risen Bull and Farnham, Elizabeth Addington (Farnham's second wife) alongside several of their female followers, professed that both Bull and Farnham had risen from the dead, setting out to convert the ten tribes of Israel, according to False prophets discovered. This group, "esteemed by understanding men to be women of good parts, honest of conversation, and very ready in the Scriptures", believed that, after this mission, the prophets would return to England and "Richard Farnham should be king upon David's throne and John Bull should be priest on Aaron's seat and they should reign forever." The fate of Bull and Farnham's followers is unrecorded, but historian Jerome Friedman speculates they "eventually followed other charismatic leaders".

According to Walter, Farnham and Bull "enjoy[ed] a different sort of afterlife" to that of their professed prophethood, serving as "good copy for the pamphlet writers" during "the religious turmoil of the early 1640s". Popular literature abounded, detailing their supposed female following and outlandish views. The sensationalist newbook, False prophets discovered, recorded Farnham's marriage to a "Mrs. Haddington", one of his reputed female followers and a "women of fine parts", despite the fact her husband was alive, and at sea, leading to her imprisonment for bigamy.
