= Apollinaris Claudius =

2nd century Christian writer and bishop

Saint Apollinaris Claudius
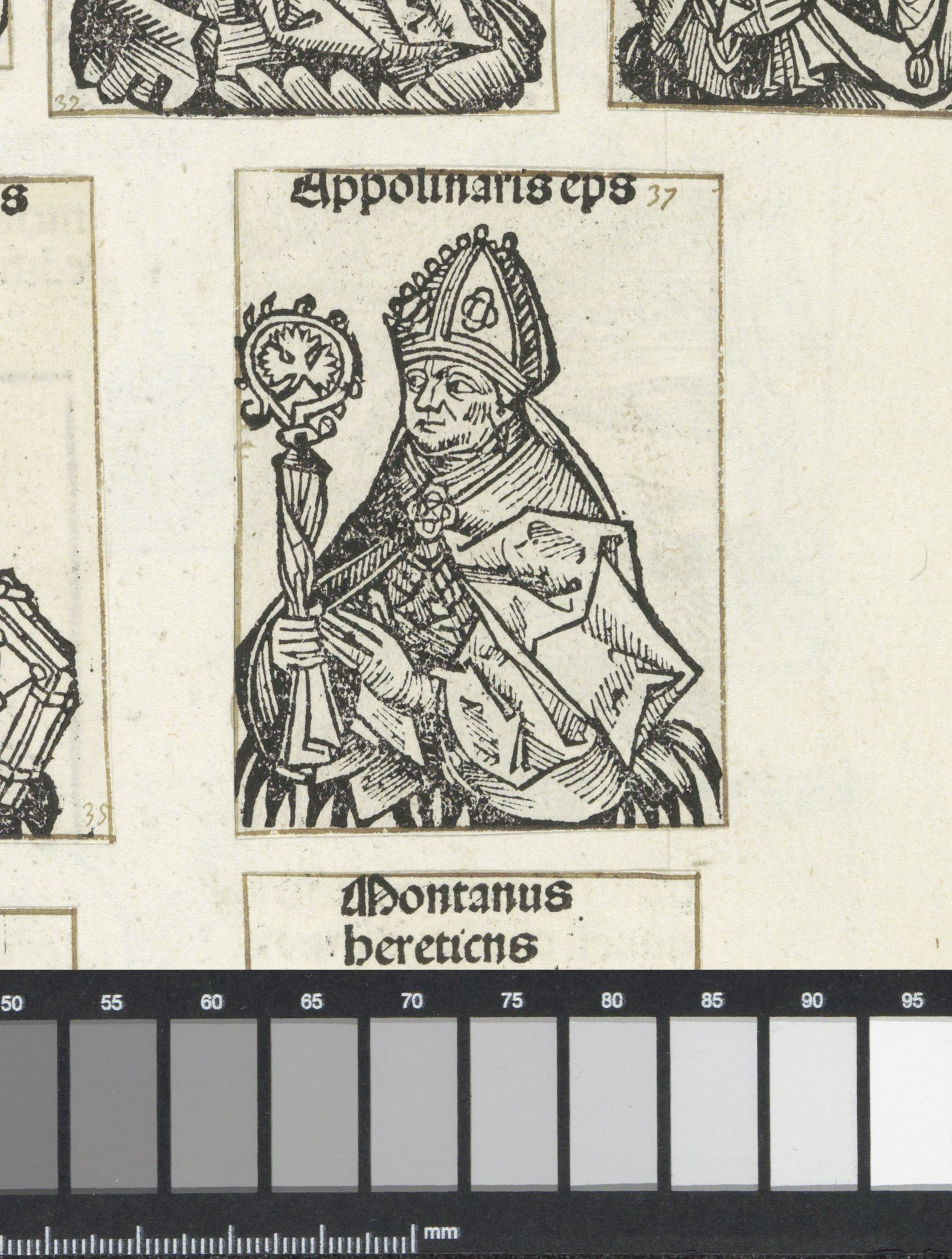

Apologist and Bishop of Hierapolis
- Died: 2nd century
- Venerated in: Eastern Orthodox Church; Roman Catholic Church
- Canonized: Pre-congregation
- Feast: January 8

Saint Apollinaris Claudius (Greek: Απολλινάριος Κλαύδιος), otherwise Apollinaris of Hierapolis or Apollinaris the Apologist, was a Christian leader and writer of the 2nd century.

== Life ==
He was Bishop of Hierapolis in Phrygia and became famous for his polemical treatises against the heretics of his day, whose errors he showed to be entirely borrowed from the pagans. In 177 he published an "Apologia" for the Christians, addressed to Marcus Aurelius, and appealing to the Emperor's own experience with the "Thundering Legion", whose prayers won him the victory over the Quadi. The exact date of his death is not known, but it was probably while Marcus Aurelius was still Emperor.

Nothing survives of his writings except for a few extracts, the longest of which relates to the date of Passover. Eusebius makes mention of his work. His feast day is commemorated on January 8.

Catholic Church Titles
Preceded by Abercius of Hieropolis	Bishop of Hierapolis; 2nd-century	Succeeded by Alexander of Hierapolis
