= Richard Farnham =

English self-proclaimed "prophet"

Richard Farnham (died 1642), was an English self-proclaimed "prophet", who claimed, with John Bull, to be one of the witnesses talked about in the Book of Revelation, xi. 3.

== Life and work ==
Farnham was a weaver who came from Colchester to Whitechapel in London around 1636, where he and a fellow-craftsman, John Bull, announced that they were prophets inspired with "the very spirit of God". They claimed to be "the two great prophets which should come in the end of the world mentioned in Revelation", and asserted "that the plague should not come nigh their dwelling". Their ravings attracted general attention.

In obedience (as he stated) to an obscure scriptural text, Farnham married Elizabeth Addington, whose husband, Thomas, a sailor, was alive at the time, although away from home. By this union Farnham had a large family. In April 1636, he and Bull were arrested on a charge of heresy, and examined on the 16th by the Court of High Commission. Farnham was committed to Newgate prison. A pamphlet issued in 1636, under the pseudonym "T. H.", reported their replies to the interrogations of the commissioners, under the title of "A True Discourse of the two infamous upstart prophets, Richard Farnham, weaver of Whitechapel, and John Bull, weaver of St. Botolph's, Aldgate" 1636. Farnham added in an appendix an explicit denial that he claimed to be Christ or Elias, or that he had prophesied a shower of blood, but insisted that he foresaw a long drought, pestilence, and war.

On 23 February 1636–7, Farnham was still in Newgate and petitioned the Archbishop of Canterbury, William Laud for his own release. He described himself as "a prophet of the most High God", expressed his fear that he had been forgotten by the court of high commission, requested to be brought to trial immediately, and threatened an appeal to the king. On 7 March, he wrote a second letter to Laud, demanding permission to return to "Long Lane, near Whittington's Cat", where he had resided, although he had now no home, his family was dispersed, and two of his children were "on the parish".

On 17 March, he petitioned the council to protect him from Laud, who declined to read his letters. Soon afterwards he was taken to Bethlehem Hospital and kept in close confinement. On 26 January 1637–8 the doctors reported to the privy council that he was sane and should have his liberty in the hospital. Meanwhile, the husband of Elizabeth Addington – the woman who had feloniously married Farnham— returned home, and charged her with bigamy. She was tried and convicted in August 1638, but was afterwards reprieved, as Farnham was held to be responsible for her crime.

The judges, after the gaol delivery at which the woman was indicted, ordered Farnham to be removed from Bethlehem to Bridewell, and there "to be kept at hard labour". Late in 1640 he sickened of the plague, and was moved to the house of a friend and disciple named Cortin or Curtain in Rosemary Lane. He died there in January 1641–2. Elizabeth Addington nursed him and reported that, in accordance with his prophecy, he rose from the dead on 8 January 1641–2. Bull died ten days after Farnham, and their followers insisted that they had "gone in vessels of bulrushes to convert the ten tribes".

Besides the pamphlet mentioned above, two others dealt with Farnham's career: 1. "A Curb for Sectaries and bold propheciers, by which Richard Farnham the Weaver, James Hunt the Farmer, M. Greene the Feltmaker, and all other the like bold Propheciers and Sect Leaders may be bridled", London, 1641. 2. "False Prophets Discovered, being a true story of the Lives and Deaths of two weavers, late of Colchester, viz. Richard Farnham and John Bull …", London, 1641[–2].
