= Artotyrite =

2nd-century Christian sect, who used bread and cheese in the Eucharist

The Artotyrites, or Artotyritæ, also known as Quintillianists, and bread and cheesers were a sect possibly connected to the ancient Montanists, who first appeared in the 2nd century and spread throughout Galatia. They used bread and cheese in the Eucharist, or perhaps baked bread with cheese. Their reason was that the first men offered to God not only fruits of the earth, but of their flocks too. Hence, according to St. Augustine, came their name, which in Greek is composed of ἀρτος, 'bread' and τυρος, 'cheese'. Augustine says, "The name of the Artotyrites is derived from their sacrificial offering, for they offer bread and cheese. They claim that the first humans made offerings from the products of the earth and of sheep". Thomas Aquinas refers to them (citing Augustine's comments) in his Summa Theologica, Part three, Question 74.
