= Praedestinatus =

Praedestinatus was a treatise composed in Rome during the 5th century, when Pope Sixtus III was the Roman Bishop. The treatise attacks predestinarian beliefs taught by Saint Augustine. The treatise is composed of multiple refutations of "heresy", one of them being the "predestinationists".

The author of treatise is unknown, but some have suggested him to have been Arnobius the Younger. The writer appears to have semi-Pelagian views, though still criticizing full-Pelagianism.
