= Philip's daughters =

Biblical figures

Philip's daughters are four women briefly mentioned in the Bible.

== Biblical account ==
They were daughters of Philip the Evangelist, one of the seven Greek-speaking Jewish men, including Stephen who were appointed deacons to the Greek-speaking Jewish widows in the Jerusalem church. He became an evangelist travelling throughout the Holy Land. By the end of the account in Acts, he was living in Caesarea Maritima with his four daughters:

The next day we left and came to Caesarea; and we went into the house of Philip the evangelist, one of the seven, and stayed with him. 9 He had four unmarried daughters who had the gift of prophecy.

== Extra-biblical references ==
Further details of these women are given in various early histories including Eusebius and Papius. It is possible that they were informants for both Luke in their youth and the early Christian historian Papias in their latter years. Eusebius quoting Papias tells us that two daughters remained with Philip in his old age, when he had moved to the Phrygian city of Hierapolis and even relates a tale that he heard from them, where someone was miraculously raised from the dead. Eusebius' source for these tales was Papias, who he extensively quoted, and who was a young Bishop of Hierapolis. It is plausible that Papias knew these women.

Eusebius held the women as examples of the right living and refers to them as “great lights” or “mighty luminaries” People would travel long distances to consult them.

A later Greek Menaon, an annual calendar equivalent to a Catholic missal, which preserves the memory of martyrs and saints, claims that two of the daughters were called Hermione and Eutychis.

Hermione and her sister Eutychis travelled to Ephesus. An early vita of Hermione also survives, and recounts much of her life.

== Burial place ==
Tradition says that two daughters, Irais and Chariline, were buried in Hierapolis. Eusebius writes “After him there were four prophetesses, the daughters of Philip, at Hierapolis in Asia. Their tomb is there and the tomb of their father.”

Other sources however, say all four were buried in Caesarea.
