= Maximilla =

Maximilla (Note: Greek: Μαξιμίλλα, romanized: Maximílla) was a prophetess and an early advocate of Montanism, a heretical Christian sect founded in the third century A.D. by Montanus. Some scholars believe that Maximilla and Priscilla, another prophet, were actually the co-founders of Montanism. Other scholars dismiss this as unproven. Either way, it is generally agreed upon that Maximilla and Priscilla provided the primary prophetic content and some of the oracles for the movement.

Nothing is known of Maximilla's family background. Perhaps she was a descendant of Roman citizens resident in Central Phrygia or its vicinity. According to Eusebius's Church History, Maximilla and Priscilla had been married but "left their husbands the moment they were filled with the spirit."

According to the anti-Montanist polemic written by an anonymous author and preserved in Eusebius’ Ecclesiastical History, Maximilla and Priscilla were pawns of the devil who spoke and acted in "a frenzied manner." According to their followers, Maximilla and Priscilla were prophetesses like early Christian prophetesses.

While Maximilla was claiming to prophesy in Pepuza, Zoticus of Comana became resistant to her teachings and tried to refute what she said. However, he was stopped by her followers and fellow Montanists. Apollinarius of Hierapolis also claimed that a bishop named Julian of Apimea rebuked her.

According to Eusebius, there were rumors that Maximilla had hanged herself while in a frenzied state. Eusebius compared her death to that of Judas Iscariot.
