= Montanus =

Second century Christian prophet

Montanus (/mɒnˈteɪnəs/; Greek: Μοντανός) was the second century founder of Montanism and a self-proclaimed prophet. Montanus emphasized the work of the Holy Spirit, in a manner which set him apart from the Great Church.

== Life ==
Little is known about the life of Montanus. Montanus used to be a pagan priest, but converted into Christianity. Montanus began his prophesying in a village called Ardabau, Phrygia. Montanus started prophesying circa 157–172, but Church Fathers give differing dates. Montanus was assisted by two women, Prisca and Maximilla, who also claimed to have prophecies.

== Teachings ==
The teachings of Montanism include:

1. That a new age of prosperity would come, and New Jerusalem will soon be established in Pepuza.
2. One could marry only once.
3. Abandoning marriage for spiritual reasons was allowed.
4. Every true Christian had to have recognizable spiritual gifts.
5. Martyrdom was encouraged and trying to escape was seen as bad.
6. The prophets could forgive sins.
7. The church could never permit apostates, murderers and fornicators back.
8. Opposition to formalism in theology.
9. A high emphasis on morality.

== Impact ==
The influence of Montanus and Marcion helped to spur the early church to begin the process of developing the New Testament canon. Montanus was heavily attacked by other early church theologians and seen as a heretic. However, Tertullian is often said to have adopted Montanism.
