= History of Christian theology =

The doctrine of the Trinity, considered the core of Christian theology by Trinitarians, is the result of continuous exploration by the church of the biblical data, thrashed out in debate and treatises, eventually formulated at the First Council of Nicaea in 325 AD in a way they believe is consistent with the biblical witness, and further refined in later councils and writings. The most widely recognized Biblical foundations for the doctrine's formulation are in the Gospel of John, which possess ideas reflected in Platonism and Greek philosophy.

Nontrinitarianism is any of several Christian beliefs that reject the Trinitarian doctrine that God is three distinct persons in one being. Modern nontrinitarian groups views differ widely on the nature of God, Jesus, and the Holy Spirit.

Historical theology is the academic study of the development of Christian theology.

== Background ==
=== Second Temple Judaism ===
Christianity originated as a sect within Second Temple Judaism (516 BC – 70 AD). Judaism's sacred scripture is the Hebrew Bible, known to Christians as the Old Testament. The Hebrew Bible is divided into three parts: the Torah ("Law"), the Nevi'im ("Prophets") and the Ketuvim ("Writings"). The central belief of Judaism is monotheism: there is one God named Yahweh (Deuteronomy 6:4, Isaiah 44:6).

==== Israel ====
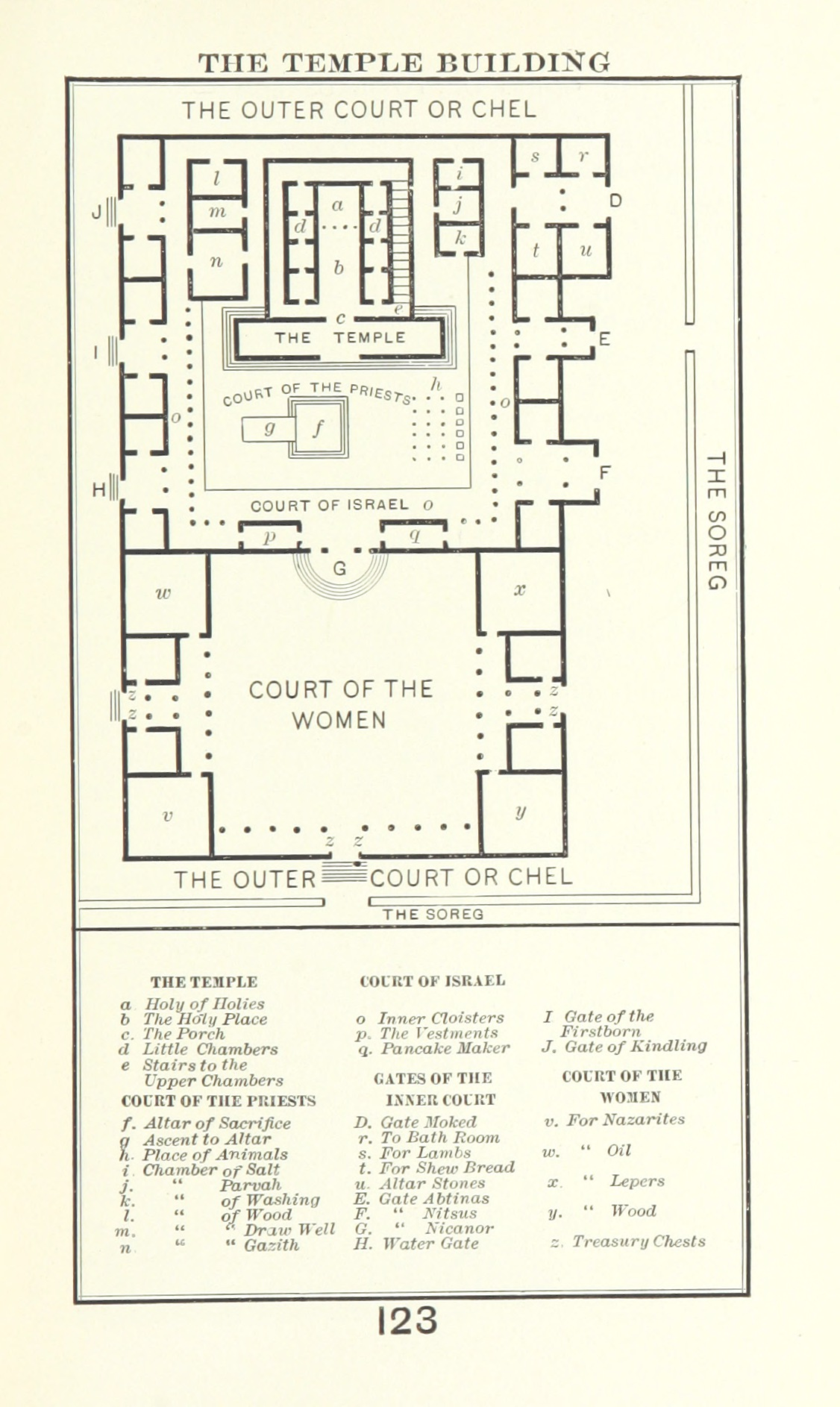
Floor plan of the Second Temple

According to the Bible, God promised Abraham, the Jewish patriarch, that his descendants would become a great nation and a blessing to all the earth (Genesis 12:3). Therefore, the Jews were a chosen people (Deuteronomy 7:6–8) bound by a covenant with God. God's election placed certain obligations on the Jewish people, and these mīṣvōt ('commandments') were found in the Torah. They were to love Yahweh with all their hearts and worship no other gods (Deuteronomy 6:4–5). Likewise, they were commanded to love one another (Leviticus 19:18). In addition, they were to observe the Sabbath, follow kosher food laws, and circumcise their sons. By obeying the commandments, Israel would be a holy nation, reflecting God's holiness to the world and manifesting the kingdom (rule) of God. Possession of the land of Israel was contingent on fidelity to the Torah, and the House of David was considered the rightful rulers over the land (2 Samuel 7:11–16).

The Temple in Jerusalem was the dwelling place and throne of God (1 Kings 8:12–13). It was there that a hereditary priesthood offered sacrifices of incense, food, and various kinds of animals to God. The sin offering (Leviticus 4–5) and the annual Day of Atonement ritual (Leviticus 16) served to both purify the temple and atone for individual and national sins. "In both cases the sacrificial blood made possible the continuation or restoration of the relation between God and his people ruptured by sin and/or prevented by human impurity."

==== Conquest and Hellenization ====
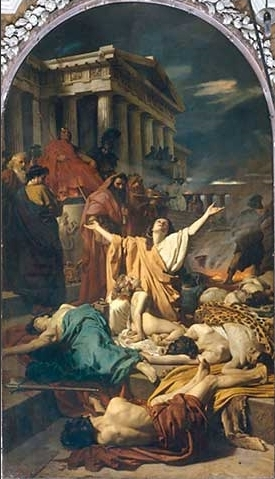
Antonio Ciseri's Martyrdom of the Seven Maccabees (1863), depicting the woman with seven sons

The First Temple was destroyed during the siege of Jerusalem in 587 BC, and the Jewish people were carried away into the Babylonian exile (586–538 BC). With the loss of the land and the temple, studying and following Torah became the central concern of Judaism. Some Jews, particularly the Pharisees, came to believe that Torah devotion could replace temple worship, and this was facilitated by the establishment of synagogues. For those unable to offer sacrifices at the temple, spiritual sacrifices (almsgiving, prayer, fasting, or Torah study) could be substituted. After the return from exile, the Second Temple became the center of Jewish national and religious life; nevertheless, the Torah continued to serve as "a portable Land, a movable Temple".

After the conquests of Alexander the Great (356–323 BC), the Jewish homeland experienced Hellenization (the spread of Greek culture). Hellenistic Judaism was a movement that sought to combine Judaism with the best elements of Greek culture. The Greek-speaking Jews of Alexandria produced a Greek translation of the Bible called the Septuagint, which was used by the first Christians.

Antiochus IV Epiphanes (r. 175 – 164 BC), king of the Seleucid Empire, adopted anti-Jewish policies in an attempt to Hellenize the Jews. He prohibited Jewish religious practices in 168 BC, introduced the worship of Zeus in the Temple in 167 BC (the "abomination of desolation" of Daniel 9:27 and Daniel 11:31), and set up pagan altars everywhere. Jews who refused to follow the king's religious policies faced death. Jewish martyrdom contributed to the belief in resurrection of the dead (2 Maccabees 7:9).

The Maccabean Revolt in 167 BC restored an independent Jewish kingdom under the Hasmonean dynasty, which ruled as kings and high priests. However, some Jews believed the Hasmoneans lacked legitimacy since they were not descended from the royal line of David nor the priestly line of Zadok. The Roman Empire conquered the Hasmonean kingdom in 63 BC and appointed client kings. Under the Romans, the formerly lifelong office of high priest was filled by temporary appointments and "became increasingly the plaything for political and financial interests."

==== Apocalypticism ====
Jewish writings offered different explanations for Israel's domination by foreigners. According to the prophets Isaiah, Jeremiah, Amos, and Hosea, Israel suffered as punishment for its sins. If the people repented, God would restore the kingdom.

An alternative worldview known as apocalypticism developed around the time of the Maccabean Revolt. The term is derived from the Greek word apocalypsis ('unveiling' or 'revealing'), and Jewish apocalypticists believed God had revealed the future to them. Major texts of apocalyptic literature were Joel, 1 Enoch, Daniel, the Isaiah apocalypse (chapters 24–27), Jubilees, Ascension of Moses, Sibylline Oracles, 4 Ezra, 2 Enoch, 2 Baruch, Apocalypse of Abraham, some of the Dead Sea Scrolls, and 3 Baruch.

Apocalypticism is a dualistic worldview. In the present age, the world is corrupted by the cosmic forces of evil (Satan and his demons). But in the future, God and his angels will destroy the forces of evil. God will redeem the whole world, not just the Jewish people. In the age to come, "there would be no suffering or pain; there would be no more hatred, despair, war, disease, or death. God would be the ruler of all, in a kingdom that would never end." At this time, there will be a last judgment and a universal resurrection so that all people can be rewarded or punished.

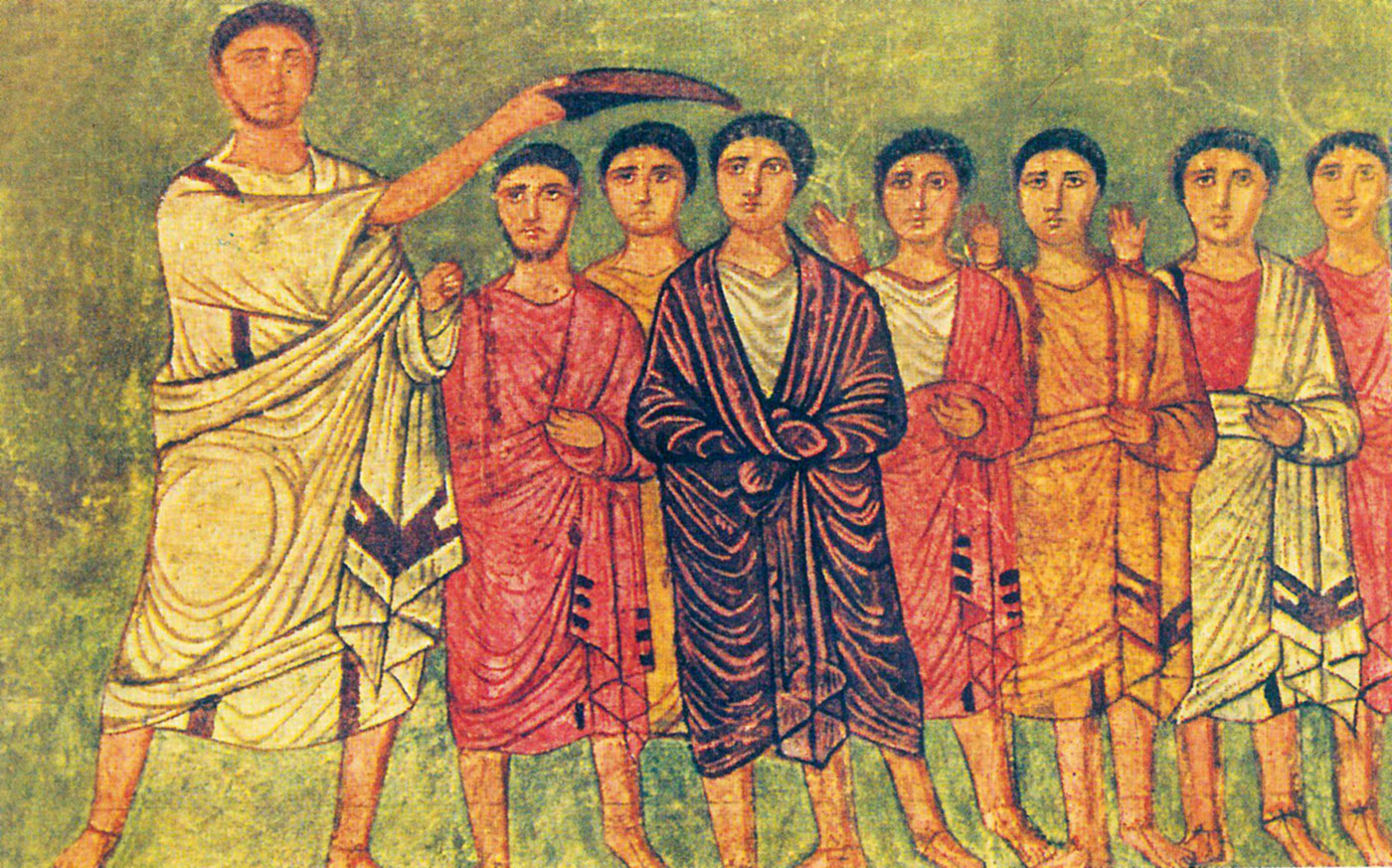
David anointed king by the prophet Samuel. Third-century AD Dura-Europos synagogue wall painting.

Apocalypticists expected God to accomplish these things by sending a savior figure or messiah. Messiah (Hebrew meshiach) means "anointed" and was used in the Old Testament to designate Jewish kings and in some cases priests and prophets whose status was symbolized by being anointed with holy anointing oil. The term is most associated with King David, to whom God promised an eternal kingdom (2 Samuel 7:11–17). After the fall of David's dynasty, this promise was reaffirmed by the prophets Isaiah, Jeremiah, and Ezekiel, who foresaw a future Davidic king who would establish and reign over an idealized kingdom.

In the Second Temple period, there was no consensus on who the messiah would be or what he would do. Some believed the messiah would be a political figure, a son of David, who would restore an independent Kingdom of Israel. A detailed description of such a Davidic messiah is found in the 17th psalm of the Psalms of Solomon. Others believed in a priestly messiah. Psalm 110 refers to a figure belonging to the priesthood of Melchizedek, the priest-king of Genesis 14:17–24. The Testament of Levi refers to God raising up a "new priest". Others anticipated the coming of a celestial figure called the Son of Man who would lead armies of angels and inaugurate the reign of God on earth (Daniel 7:13–14).

==== Jewish sects ====
After the Maccabean Revolt, several Jewish sects emerged that differed on their interpretations of the Torah, their reaction to foreign domination, and their acceptance of a non-Zadokite high priest. The New Testament explicitly mentions three Jewish sects, and the Jewish historian Josephus mentions four.

The Pharisees rejected Greek religion and culture. They were committed to obeying the Torah and developed rules to clarify its ambiguities. For example, the Ten Commandments required Jews to keep the Sabbath holy, but the Torah does not explain how this is to be done. The rules developed by the Pharisees became known as the oral Torah. Like priests serving in the Temple, Pharisees attempted to maintain a state of Temple holiness throughout their daily lives by adhering to Jewish purity laws. This required them to separate from ordinary people and could explain the origin of the term Pharisee, which means "separated ones". As a lay movement, the Pharisees had no official religious role within Judaism, but they were respected by ordinary Jews. Pharisaic ideas, such as belief in angels, demons, and resurrection became widely accepted.

The Sadducees were drawn from the families of the chief priests and the Jewish aristocracy. Their religion centered on the Temple and its sacrifices, and they cooperated with the Romans so that those sacrifices could continue. They were less concerned with purity regulations in daily life. The Sadducees only accepted the written Torah as authoritative, and they denied the existence of angels or a future resurrection.

The Essenes formed in protest of the Hasmonean usurpation of the high priesthood and refused to worship at the Jerusalem Temple. Separating from other Jews, they were an ascetic movement focused on strict adherence to the Torah and purity regulations. Like the Pharisees, Essenes believed in the existence of angels and in a future resurrection. The Essenes were an apocalyptic sect that believed God would give Israel two messiahs—a Davidic king and an anointed priest—to lead the Sons of Light in a war against the Sons of Darkness. The Sons of Light will be victorious, and a new Temple will be built to replace the corrupt one.

Josephus writes about an unnamed "fourth philosophy" that could include several different groups, particularly the Zealots and the Sicarii. These groups endorsed armed resistance against foreign rulers and their Jewish collaborators.

=== Greek philosophy ===
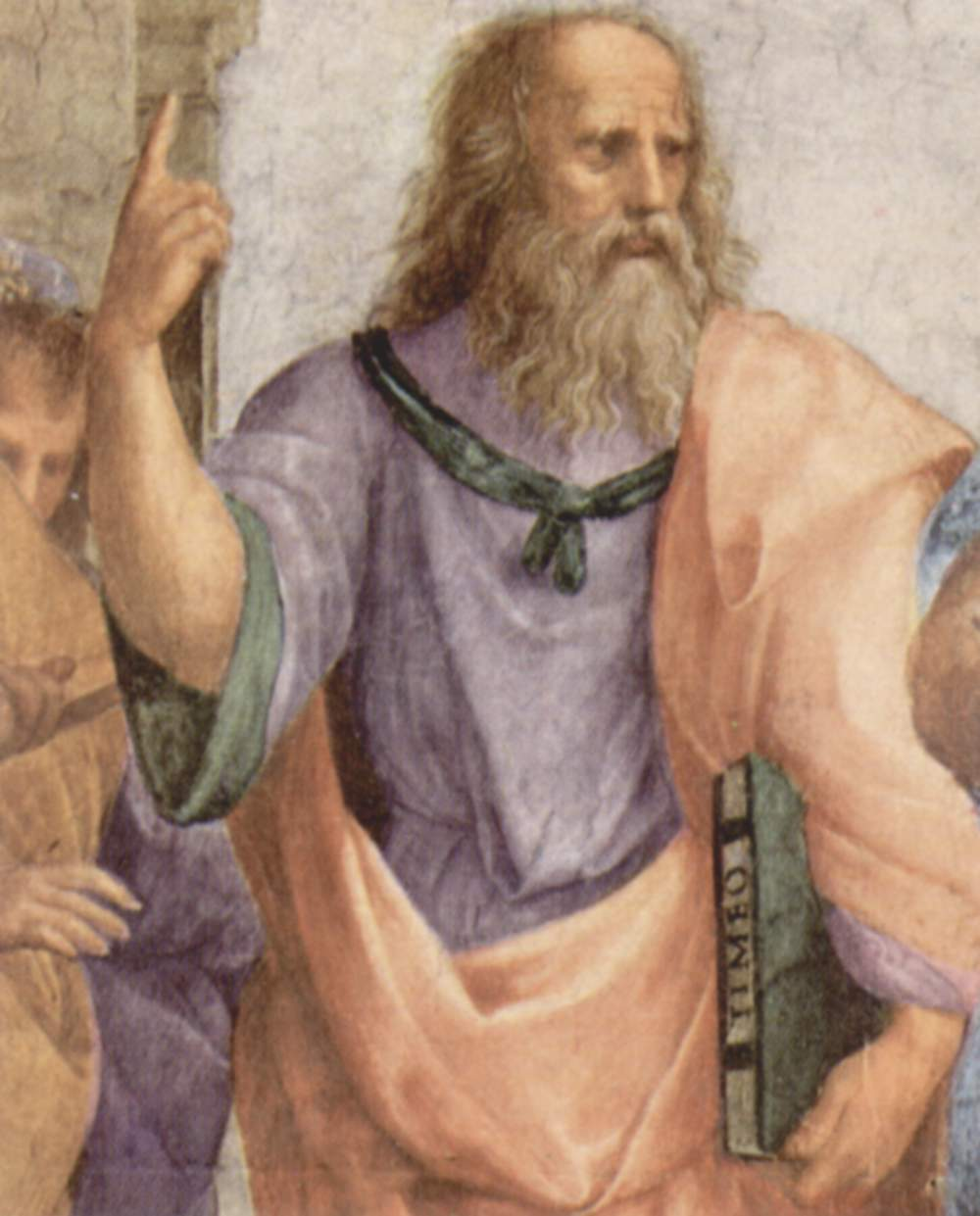
Plato, detail of The School of Athens (1511) by Raphael

Church historian Diarmaid MacCulloch has observed that "Christianity in its first five centuries was in many respects a dialogue between Judaism and Graeco-Roman philosophy". There are similarities between early Christianity and ancient philosophy. Biblical scholar Udo Schnelle writes, "philosophy is a salutary means for living well and dying well ... The followers of Jesus of Nazareth practiced a comparable lifestyle, treated comparable subjects, and produced comparable literature."

The related philosophies of Cynicism and Stoicism emphasized ethics and individual freedom. Cynics "commended and practiced a lifestyle oriented to nature and to reason, which eradicates false passions from the soul (lust, craving, anger) and leads to a simple life without needs." Some Cynics adopted a wandering, ascetic way of life that may have influenced Christian asceticism.

Stoicism taught monistic pantheism, according to which a benevolent, impersonal reason (Greek: logos) permeates the universe and is the source of human reason. "Because all humans are part of a grand design that is rational, Stoics thought that reason had put everyone ... in a place for a purpose", and Stoics strove to live in accordance with reason. One need only obey what Stoics called the natural law to be virtuous. To attain virtue (practical wisdom, moderation, self-control, and justice), a person must become free of the passions (fear, grief, lust, hate, etc.). Stoicism's ethical teachings and its doctrines of the logos and natural law had important influences on early Christian ethics and thought. The Apostle Paul uses Stoic terminology in 1 Corinthians when describing the Christian community as a body in which each part is necessary. As described in the Acts of the Apostles, Paul used Stoic ideas in his Areopagus sermon at Athens.

The most important philosophical influence was Middle Platonism (68 BC – 250 AD) and Neo-Platonism (250–500):

- According to the theory of forms, there are two worlds, the world of ideas and the physical world of perception. The latter experiences change, illusion, and decay. God belongs the world of ideas, which is intelligible and transcendent. This influenced Christian ideas of the "world" and also heaven and earth.
- Plato's Idea of the Good had a significant influence on Christian conceptions of God. In Platonic thought, the supreme deity was perfect and unchangeable. But this supreme god lacked "compassion for human tragedy, because compassion is a passion or emotion" which involves changes in mood. This was a very different deity from the biblical God. While the God of the Bible was transcendent, he was also passionate and compassionate towards humans. Indeed, the biblical God was constantly intervening in the affairs of Israel. Despite these differences, "there arose the custom, deeply entrenched in some theological circles, of speaking of God in the same terms Plato used to refer to the Idea of the Good: God is impassive, infinite, incomprehensible, indescribable, and so on."
- Plato's theory of the soul was used by Christians to defend their own beliefs about immortality and life after death.
- Under the influence of Platonic epistemology (theory of knowledge), Christians adopted a distrust of sensory perception as a means of attaining knowledge. Nevertheless, Christians rejected the Platonic idea that learning is actually "recall" or "reminiscence" as this required belief in the pre-existence of souls, which Christians rejected.

== Jesus ==
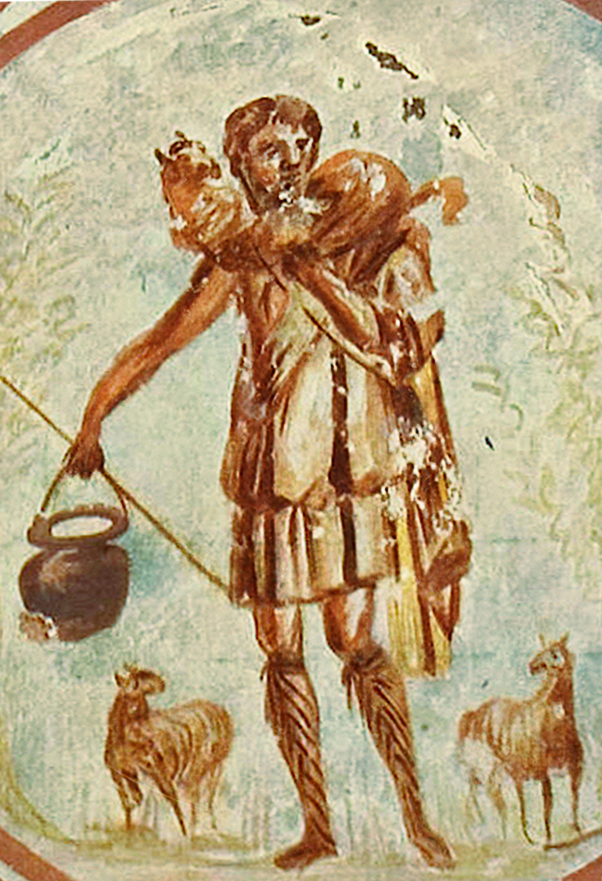
One of the oldest representations of Jesus as the Good Shepherd, made around 300 AD

=== Early sources ===
Christianity centers on the life and teachings of Jesus of Nazareth, who lived c. 4 BC – c. AD 33. In the early years of Christianity, oral gospel traditions would have been important in transmitting memories and stories of Jesus. (Note: The New Testament writings, especially Acts of the Apostles and the Gospel of John, place emphasis on disciples "bearing witness" to the ministry, crucifixion, and resurrection of Jesus.) Biblical scholar Peter Stuhlmacher writes, "The men and women surrounding Jesus learned his sayings by heart in accordance with the early Jewish pattern, preserved them in their memory, and passed them on to others." Biblical scholar Bart D. Ehrman writes, "Stories about Jesus were thus being told throughout the Mediterranean for decades to convert people and to educate those who had converted, to win people to faith and to instruct those who had been brought in; stories were told in evangelism, in education, in exhortation, and probably in services of worship." According to biblical scholar Anthony Le Donne, early Christian communities preserved memories of Jesus by relating them to familiar stories or types, such as the son of David.

The oldest surviving written sources about Jesus are 1st-century texts that were later included in the New Testament. The earliest are the seven authentic Pauline epistles, (Note: According to MacCulloch (2010, p. 1025), scholars consider seven Pauline epistles to have been genuinely written by Paul: Romans, First Corinthians, Second Corinthians, Galatians, Philippians, First Thessalonians and Philemon. The authenticity of the remaining epistles are doubted: Ephesians, Colossians, Second Thessalonians, First Timothy, Second Timothy, Titus and Hebrews.) letters written to various Christian congregations by Paul the Apostle in the 50s AD. The four canonical gospels are ancient biographies of Jesus' life. The oldest is the Gospel of Mark, written c. 65 – c. 75. The gospels of Matthew and Luke were written c. 80 – c. 95. The Gospel of John was written last, around 100.

The oral and written transmission that led to the gospels involved eyewitnesses, who would have contributed to the development of the gospel tradition and been consulted as what would become the Gospels took shape. (Note: Byrskog writes that a 'decisive body of eyewitnesses [...] to be questioned and interrogated as the gospel tradition eventually took shape and developed') The gospels were likely composed within the lifetimes of various eyewitnesses, including Jesus's own family. However, biblical scholar Helen Bond writes that the canonical gospels "clearly reflect the post-Easter reflections of the early church. They were not written by eye-witnesses".

Biblical scholar Dale Allison notes, "our Synoptic [Gospel] writers thought that they were reconfiguring memories of Jesus, not inventing theological tales." However, this does not guarantee the gospels' historical accuracy. As Bond points out, the gospels are not "primarily historical accounts of the life of Jesus" but "are declarations of the true identity of Jesus as Christ and Son of God, written with the intention of encouraging or strengthening the faith of their earliest readers."

=== Teachings ===
The four canonical gospels focus on three themes:

1. What Jesus taught, particularly the parables of Jesus.
2. What Jesus did, particularly the miracles of Jesus.
3. What witnesses said about Jesus.

As the Christ or "Anointed One" (Greek: Christos), Jesus is identified as the fulfillment of messianic prophecies in the Old Testament. Through the accounts of his miraculous virgin birth, the gospels present Jesus as the Son of God. Throughout the New Testament, Jesus is called kyrios ("lord" in Greek), a word used in the Septuagint translation of the Hebrew Bible for the name of God.

While the synoptic gospels agree with each other on the broad outlines of Jesus' life, each gospel has its own emphasis. The Gospel of Mark presents Jesus as "the suffering Messiah, the Son of man who is crucified and later vindicated by God". In Matthew, Jesus is Messiah, Son of David, and a new Moses. In Luke, he is a prophet and martyr. In John, Jesus is described as God himself. In an appropriation of Greek philosophical concepts, John's Gospel identifies Jesus as the divine logos by which the world was created: "And the Word became flesh and lived among us, and we have seen his glory" (John 1:14).

Jesus' message centered on the coming of the Kingdom of God (in Jewish eschatology a future when God actively rules over the world in justice, mercy, and peace). Jesus urged his followers to repent in preparation for the kingdom's coming. In Mark 1:15, Jesus proclaims, "The time is fulfilled, and the kingdom of God is at hand; repent and believe in the gospel." His ethical teachings included loving one's enemies, not serving both God and Mammon, and not judging others. These ethical teachings are encapsulated in the Sermon on the Mount and the Lord's Prayer.

To Jewish audiences, early preaching focused on Jesus as the fulfillment of Israel's messianic hopes (see for example the Apostle Peter's sermon in Acts 2). When preaching to Greek audiences, however, Christians appealed to the Greek intellectual tradition. This approach can be seen in the Areopagus sermon delivered by the Apostle Paul as described in Acts 17. Citing Athenian worship of the Unknown God, Paul proclaims that this god is revealed to humanity through Jesus. Quoting the Athenian poet Aratus, Paul states that in God "we live and move and have our being" (Acts 17:28).

=== Crucifixion and resurrection ===
After his cleansing of the Temple, Jesus was arrested, tried, and crucified. According to John, Jesus dies on the day of preparation for Passover, when the Passover sacrifice was slaughtered in the temple. John understands Jesus to be the Lamb of God and Suffering Servant who takes away the sins of the world (John 1:29, also 1 Corinthians 5:7).

The followers of Jesus believed he appeared to them after his death. The oldest written account of Easter is provided by Paul in 1 Corinthians 15:3–5. Given his conversion occurred c. 32 – c. 33 AD, the tradition he cites must be older than 40 AD. The passage states:

For I handed on to you as of first importance what I in turn had received: that Christ died for our sins in accordance with the scriptures, and that he was buried, and that he was raised on the third day in accordance with the scriptures, and that he appeared to Cephas, then to the twelve.

The resurrection of Jesus became the foundation of Christianity. Paul writes, "If Christ has not been raised, then our proclamation is vain, and your faith is also vain" (1 Corinthians 15:14). The gospel accounts conclude with a description of the Ascension of Jesus. The New Testament epistles explain that Jesus makes salvation possible, and the resurrection confirms the truth of his identity. Through faith, believers experience union with Jesus and both share in his suffering and the hope of his resurrection.

== First century ==
=== Gentile Christians and Jewish law ===
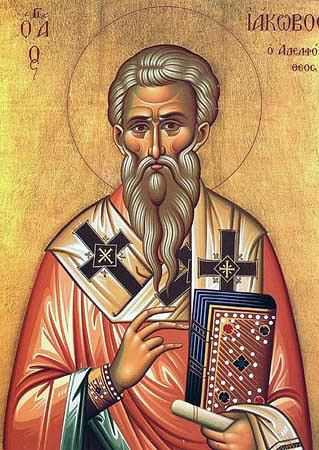
James the Just, leader of the Jerusalem church

The first Christians were Jewish Christians, and the center of Christianity was the church in Jerusalem. Acts records that during the 40s and 50s AD there was controversy over circumcision and the place of Gentiles (non-Jews) in the movement. The Judaizers believed that Gentile Christians needed to follow Jewish laws and customs, particularly circumcision, to be saved. Paul, however, argued that no one could be made righteous or justified by following the law of Moses but only through faith in Jesus, citing the prophet Habakkuk: "he who through faith is righteous shall live" (Habbakuk 2:4). At the Council of Jerusalem held in 49 AD, it was decided that Gentile believers would not have to undergo circumcision.

The issue remained alive for many years after the Jerusalem council. New Testament sources suggest that James the Just, brother of Jesus and leader of the Jerusalem church still believed the Torah was binding on Jewish Christians. In Galatians 2:11-14, Paul described "people from James" causing the Apostle Peter and other Jewish Christians in Antioch to break table fellowship with Gentiles. Joel Marcus, professor of Christian origins, suggests that Peter's own position was somewhere between James and Paul, but that he probably leaned more toward James.

The Epistle of James stresses the importance of the Torah as "the perfect law of liberty" and "the implanted word that is able to save your souls". Marcus comments that in the epistle "little room is left for the saving function of Jesus, who is mentioned only twice, and in an incidental way (1.1, 2:1)."

The influence of the Jerusalem church and its form of Jewish Christianity declined after the Jewish revolt of 66–70 AD and never recovered. Pauline theology became the mainstream form of Christianity, and "all Christians alive today are the heirs of the Church which Paul created."

=== Holy Spirit ===
References to the Holy Spirit are found in the New Testament, but it is not fully clear how the Spirit relates to Jesus. The term would have been familiar to Jewish Christians. In the Gospel of John, the Spirit descends on Jesus during his baptism by John the Baptist. Paul speaks of the Spirit often in his letters. The Spirit unites all Christians: "For by one Spirit we were all baptized into one body—Jews or Greeks, slaves or free—and all were made to drink of one Spirit" (1 Corinthians 12:13).

Paul wrote that the Spirit empowers the church with various gifts or charismata. In 1 Corinthians 14, Paul wrote about the practice of ecstatically speaking in tongues (or unknown languages). Acts 2:1–13 described how the Spirit descended on the Twelve Apostles on the feast of Pentecost and made them speak in foreign languages.

== Patristic era ==
The period between the last New Testament writings (c. 100) and the Council of Chalcedon (451) is called the patristic era, named for the Church Fathers (Latin: pater, 'father'). The Anglican, Catholic, Eastern Orthodox, Lutheran, and Reformed churches consider themselves to be continuations of the patristic tradition.

A large quantity of theological reflection emerged in the early centuries of the Christian church—in a wide variety of genres, in a variety of contexts, and in several languages—much of it the product of attempts to discuss how Christian faith should be lived in cultures very different from the one in which it was born. For instance, a good deal of Greek language literature can be read as an attempt to come to terms with Hellenistic culture. The period sees the slow emergence of orthodoxy (the idea of which seems to emerge from the conflicts between Catholic Christianity and Gnostic Christianity), the establishment of a Biblical canon, debates about the doctrine of the Trinity (most notably between the councils of Nicaea in 325 and Constantinople in 381), about Christology (most notably between the councils of Constantinople in 381 and Chalcedon in 451), about the purity of the Church (for instance in the debates surrounding the Donatists), and about grace, free will and predestination (for instance in the debate between Augustine of Hippo and Pelagius).

Influential texts and writers in the 2nd century include:

- The collection known as the Apostolic Fathers (mostly 2nd century)(including: Clement of Rome, Ignatius of Antioch, Polycarp of Smyrna, Papias of Hierapolis, Quadratus of Athens)
- Justin Martyr (c. 100/114 – c. 162/168)
- Clement of Alexandria (died c. 215)
- Irenaeus of Lyons (c. 130–202)
- Various 'Gnostic' authors, such as Marcion (c. 85 – c. 160), Valentinius (c. 100 – c. 153) and Basilides (c. 117–138)
- Some of the texts commonly referred to as the New Testament apocrypha.

Influential texts and writers between c. 200 and 325 (the First Council of Nicaea) include:

- Tertullian (c. 155–230)
- Hippolytus (died 235)
- Origen (c. 182 – c. 251)
- Cyprian (died c. 258)
- Arius (256–336)
- Other Gnostic texts and texts from the New Testament apocrypha.

=== Second century ===
==== Apostolic Fathers ====
The earliest Patristic writings is a collection known as the Apostolic Fathers. The name was applied to this collection in the 16th century because it was believed that the authors had been trained by the apostles. There is some chronological overlap between the latest writings of the New Testament and the earliest of the Apostolic Fathers. For example, the Didache was probably written well within the New Testament period.

The collection spans various genres, but the writings share two themes in common: paraenesis (moral teaching) and discussion of Christianity's relationship to Judaism. The collection also reveals the development of distinct theological schools or orientations: Asia Minor and Syria, Rome, and Alexandria. The school of Asia Minor (the Johannine literature, Ignatius, Polycarp, and Papias) stressed union with Christ for attaining eternal life. Roman Christianity (Clement and The Shepherd of Hermas) was influenced by Stoicism and stressed ethics and morality. The Alexandrian school (Epistle of Barnabas) was influenced by Middle Platonism and Neoplatonism. It combined a focus on ethics with an allegorical interpretation of the Old Testament in the tradition of Philo.

1 Clement is a letter written around AD 96 by Clement I, the bishop of Rome, to the church in Corinth. While Clement mainly addresses those Corinthians who had become rebellious and divisive, the letter also provides clues to his theology. Several trinitarian formulas are present, such as, "Have we not one God and one Christ and one Spirit of grace, the Spirit that has been poured out on us?" Clement's Christology is characterized by a belief in the pre-existence of Christ. Clement provides the earliest articulation of apostolic succession: the apostles chose holy men to succeed them and these in turn chose their own successors who cannot be deposed by the congregation. He calls these church leaders bishops and deacons; however, he sometimes uses the title presbyter interchangeably with bishop, indicating that these two offices had not yet become separated.

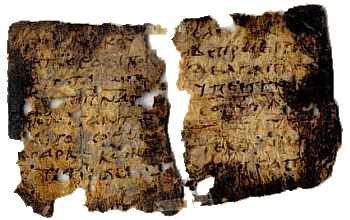
Manuscript of the Didache

The Didache or Doctrine of the Twelve Apostles is a church order or manual probably composed in the late 1st century or early 2nd century in Palestine or Syria. This document provides insight into early Christian liturgy, which is clearly influenced by ancient Jewish practice. It regards immersion baptism as normal but allows for affusion (pouring water over the head), which is the earliest description of an alternative method of baptism. The eucharist is described, but it is not yet separate from the agape feast. In the Didache, prophets are the preeminent leaders of the church with bishops and deacons in subordinate roles. It is possible this arrangement represents "a period of transition between the primitive system of charismatic authority and the hierarchical organization that was slowly developing within the church".

Ignatius, the bishop of Antioch, wrote seven surviving letters while traveling as a prisoner to face martyrdom in Rome. Ignatius wrote to defend belief in the incarnation of God in Jesus Christ from Judaizers, who believed Jesus was only a human teacher, and Docetists, who denied the humanity of Jesus. In his Epistle to the Ephesians, Ignatius affirmed both the divinity and humanity of Christ: "There is one Physician: both flesh and spirit, begotten and unbegotten, in man, God, in death, true life, both from Mary and from God, first passible and then impassible, Jesus Christ our Lord". Ignatius was the first writer to describe the church as catholic, by which he meant it was whole or complete in contrast to the heretical sects. It is within the church that a person is united with Christ through the sacraments, especially the eucharist. However, there is no church apart from the bishops, presbyters, and deacons who are the successors to the apostles. Ignatius provided the earliest description of a monarchical bishop, instructing his readers that nothing be done in the church without the bishop's consent, including baptism, the eucharist, and marriage. Ignatius identified the eucharist closely with the death and resurrection of Christ—"it is the flesh of our Saviour Jesus Christ, which flesh suffered for our sins and which the Father raised up". For Ignatius, the eucharist unites the believer to the passion of Christ. He wrote that it was "the medicine of immortality, the antidote which results not in dying but in living forever in Jesus Christ".

The author of the Epistle of Barnabas used an allegorical interpretation of the Old Testament to harmonize it with Christian teachings. The stories of the Old Testament were understood to be types that point to the saving work of Jesus. The Apostolic Fathers, all of whom were Gentiles, struggled with the authority of the Old Covenant and the relationship between Judaism and Christianity. The Epistle of Barnabas 14.3-4 claimed the tablets of the covenant were destroyed at Sinai and that Israel had no covenant with God.

The Shepherd of Hermas taught that a person could be forgiven once for postbaptismal sin (sins committed after baptism). Hermas also introduced the idea of works of supererogation (to do more than the commandments of God require). This concept would contribute to the later development of the treasury of merit and the Western Church's penitential system. In The Shephard of Hermas, the Holy Spirit is conflated with the Son of God: "the holy pre-existent Spirit which created the whole creation God made to dwell in flesh that he desired. This flesh therefore in which the Holy Spirit dwelt was subject to the Spirit ... He chose this flesh as a partner with the Holy Spirit".

The Apostolic Fathers placed great importance on baptism. According to theologian Geoffrey Hugo Lampe, the Fathers considered baptism to be "the seal with which believers are marked out as God's people, the way of death to sin and demons and of rebirth to resurrection-life, the new white robe which must be preserved undefiled, the shield of Christ's soldier, the sacrament of the reception of the Holy Spirit." The Apostolic Fathers also clearly considered the eucharist to be the center of Christian worship.

==== Apocryphal literature ====
During the same time period as the Apostolic Fathers, Christians were also producing works claiming to be ancient Jewish texts. These are considered Old Testament pseudepigrapha, and the most important are:

- Ascension of Isaiah
- Testaments of the Twelve Patriarchs
- Second Book of Enoch

The early 2nd century also saw the production of works claiming apostolic origin and are now categorized as New Testament apocryphal literature:

- Gospel of Peter
- Revelation of Peter
- Gospel of the Hebrews
- Epistle of the Apostles

==== Greek apologists ====
In the middle of the 2nd century, Christian apologists wrote to defend the faith against criticism and persecution by Roman authorities. In general, the apologists responded to two types of accusations, popular rumors about Christian practices (such as that they ate children or that the lovefeast was actually an orgy) and sophisticated attacks on Christian beliefs (such as that Christians borrowed and corrupted ideas from Greek philosophy). The Greek apologists are:.

- Aristides of Athens
- Justin Martyr
- Tatian
- Athenagoras of Athens
- Theophilus of Antioch
- Hermias
- Epistle to Diognetus
- Melito of Sardis

Justin Martyr is the most important of the 2nd-century apologists. Justin's explanation of Christian beliefs was influenced by Middle Platonism. For him, God the Father was transcendent, and he begot the logos (Word) who reveals the Father to creation. Christ is the logos and source of all truth. The Greek philosophers of the past only knew the Word partially. But the full truth was revealed to Christians in the person of Jesus Christ. In Justin's Dialogue with Trypho, the Jewish Trypho accused Christians of holding the Mosaic covenant in "rash contempt". Justin distinguishes between different parts of the Old Covenant, saying that Christians kept what was "naturally good, pious, and righteous". Justin also uses typological interpretation to connect events in the Old Testament to Christ. For example, the Passover sacrifice was a type of Christ whose blood saves those who believe in him.

=== Biblical canon ===
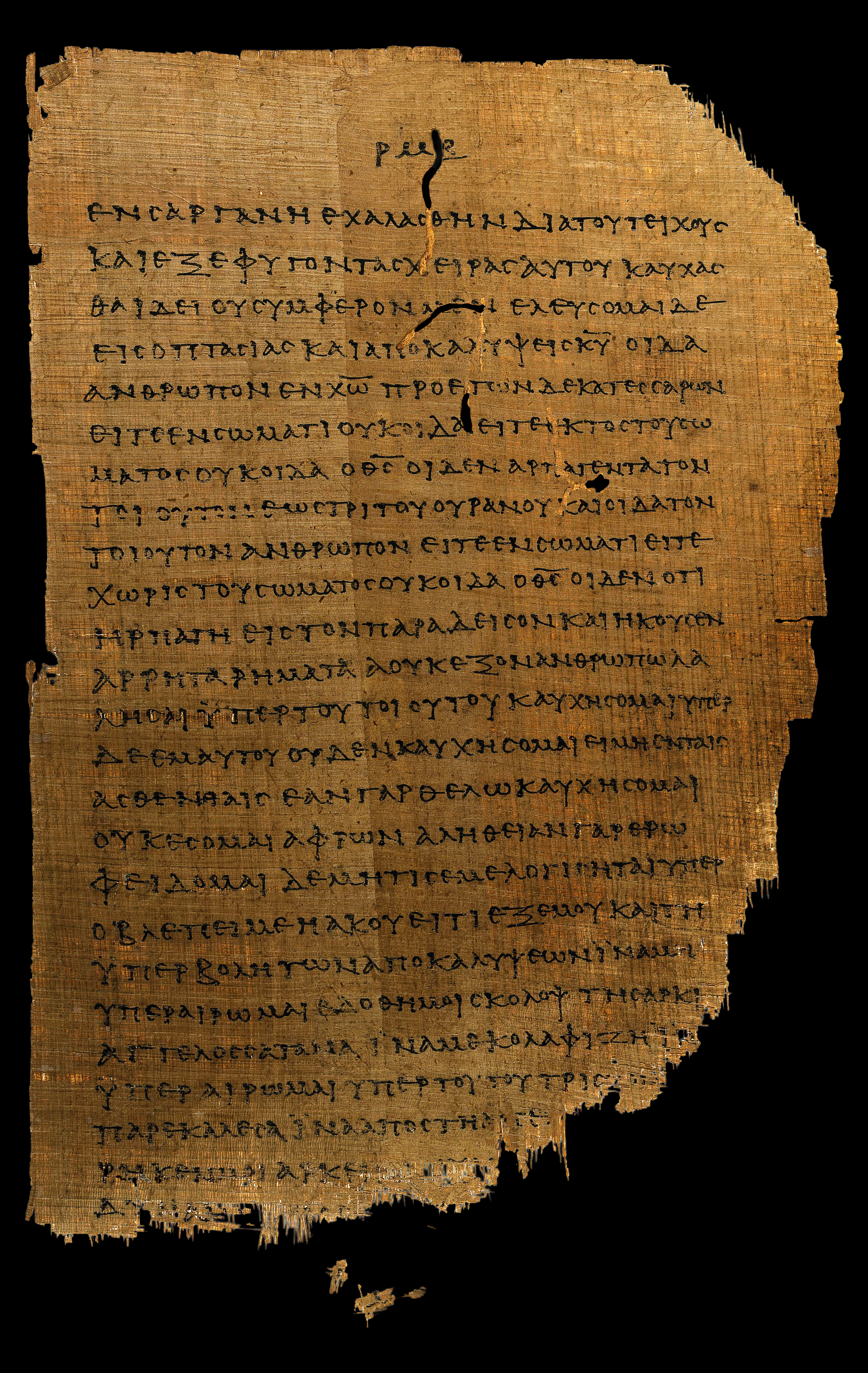
A folio from P46, an early 3rd-century collection of Pauline epistles.

When New Testament authors used the word scripture, they referred to writings in the Old Testament. In a relatively short time, Christian writers began referring to New Testament writings as scripture. Several criteria were used to determine which books belonged in the scriptural canon:

- used in Christian worship
- reflected tradition thought to be apostolic in origin
- was catholic (or "universal") in the sense of being in widespread use

By the late 2nd century, there was general agreement on the canonicity of the four gospels, Acts, and the Pauline letters. Origen (c. 185 – c. 254) used the same 27 books as in the modern New Testament but noted there were disputes over the canonicity of Hebrews, James, 2 Peter, 2 John, 3 John, and Revelation.

In 367, Athanasius, the bishop of Alexandria, included in his Easter letter a list of canonical books identical to the modern New Testament. This list was accepted by the Greek church and the Council of Rome under Pope Damasus I in 382. Athanasius' list was also approved by the Synod of Hippo in 393 and the Synod of Carthage in 397 in North Africa. By the 5th century, there was common agreement on the New Testament canon in most of the churches.

=== Nicene Creed ===
Each phrase in the Nicene Creed, which was hammered out at the Council of Nicaea, addresses some aspect that had been under passionate discussion and closes the books on the argument, with the weight of the agreement of the over 300 bishops in attendance. Constantine had invited all 1800 bishops of the Christian church (about 1000 in the east and 800 in the west). The number of participating bishops cannot be accurately stated; Socrates Scholasticus and Epiphanius of Salamis counted 318; Eusebius of Caesarea, only 250. In spite of the agreement reached at the council of 325, the Arians who had been defeated dominated most of the church for the greater part of the 4th century, often with the aid of Roman emperors who favored them.

==== Nicene and Post-Nicene Fathers ====
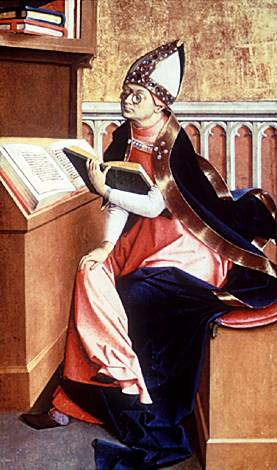
Augustine

Late antiquity Christianity produced many Church Fathers who wrote theological texts, including SS;Augustine, Gregory Nazianzus, Cyril of Jerusalem, Ambrose of Milan, Jerome, and others. What resulted was a golden age of literary and scholarly activity unmatched since the days of Virgil and Horace. Some of these fathers, such as John Chrysostom and Athanasius, suffered exile, persecution, or martyrdom from Byzantine Emperors. Many of their writings are translated into English in the compilations of Nicene and Post-Nicene Fathers.

Influential texts and writers between AD 325 and c. 500 include:

- Athanasius (298–373)
- The Cappadocian Fathers (late 4th century)
- Ambrose (c. 340–397)
- Jerome (c. 347–420)
- Chrysostom (347–407)
- Augustine of Hippo (354–430)
- Cyril of Alexandria (376–444)

Texts from patristic authors after AD 325 are collected in the Nicene and Post-Nicene Fathers. Important theological debates also surrounded the various Ecumenical Councils—Nicaea in 325, Constantinople in 381, Ephesus in 431 and Chalcedon in 451.

==== Papacy and primacy ====
The theology of the Bishop of Rome, having a monarchal papacy, developed over time. As a bishopric, its origin is consistent with the development of an episcopal structure in the 1st century. The origins of the papal primacy concept are historically obscure; theologically, it is based on three ancient Christian traditions: (1) that the apostle Peter was preeminent among the apostles, (2) that Peter ordained his successors as Bishop of Rome, and (3) that the bishops are the successors of the apostles. As long as the Papal See also happened to be the capital of the Western Empire, prestige of the Bishop of Rome could be taken for granted without the need of sophisticated theological argumentation beyond these points; after its shift to Milan and then Ravenna, however, more detailed arguments were developed based on Matthew 16:18–19 etc. Nonetheless, in antiquity the Petrine and Apostolic quality, as well as a "primacy of respect", concerning the Roman See went unchallenged by emperors, eastern patriarchs, and the Eastern Church alike. The Ecumenical Council of Constantinople in 381 affirmed Rome as "first among equals". By the close of antiquity, the doctrinal clarification and theological arguments on the primacy of Rome were developed. Just what exactly was entailed in this primacy, and its being exercised, would become a matter of controversy in later times.

=== Early heresies ===
Urgent concerns with the uniformity of belief and practice have characterized Christianity from the outset. The New Testament itself speaks of the importance of maintaining orthodox doctrine and refuting heresies, showing the antiquity of the concern. The development of doctrine, the position of orthodoxy, and the relationship between the early Church and early heretical groups is a matter of academic debate. Some scholars, drawing upon distinctions between Jewish Christians, Gentile Christians, and other groups such as Gnostics, see Early Christianity as fragmented and with contemporaneous competing orthodoxies.

The process of establishing orthodox Christianity was set in motion by a succession of different interpretations of the teachings of Christ being taught after the crucifixion. Though Christ himself is noted to have spoken out against false prophets and false christs within the gospels themselves Mark 13:22 (some will arise and distort the truth in order to draw away disciples), Matthew 7:5–20, Matthew 24:4, Matthew 24:11, Matthew 24:24 (For false christs and false prophets will arise). On many occasions in Paul's epistles, he defends his own apostleship, and urges Christians in various places to beware of false teachers, or of anything contrary to what was handed to them by him. The epistles of John and Jude also warn of false teachers and prophets, as does the writer of the Book of Revelation and 1 Jn. 4:1, as did the Apostle Peter warn in 2 Pt. 2:1–3.

One of the roles of bishops, and the purpose of many Christian writings, was to refute heresies. The earliest of these were generally Christological in nature, that is, they denied either Christ's (eternal) divinity or humanity. For example, Docetism held that Jesus' humanity was merely an illusion, thus denying the incarnation; whereas Arianism held that Jesus was not eternally divine. Many groups were dualistic, maintaining that reality was composed of two radically opposing parts: matter, usually seen as evil, and spirit, seen as good. Orthodox Christianity, on the other hand, held that both the material and spiritual worlds were created by God and were therefore both good, and that this was represented in the unified divine and human natures of Christ.

Irenaeus (c. 130–202) was the first to argue that his "proto-orthodox" position was the same faith that Jesus gave to the apostles, and that the identity of the apostles, their successors, and the teachings of the same were all well-known public knowledge. This was therefore an early argument supported by apostolic succession. Irenaeus first established the doctrine of four gospels and no more, with the synoptic gospels interpreted in the light of John. Irenaeus' opponents, however, claimed to have received secret teachings from Jesus via other apostles which were not publicly known. Gnosticism is predicated on the existence of such hidden knowledge, but brief references to private teachings of Jesus have also survived in the canonic Scripture as did warning by the Christ that there would be false prophets or false teachers. Irenaeus' opponents also claimed that the wellsprings of divine inspiration were not dried up, which is the doctrine of continuing revelation.

In the middle of the 2nd century, three groups of Christians adhered to a range of doctrines that divided the Christian communities of Rome: the teacher Marcion, the pentecostal outpourings of ecstatic Christian prophets of a continuing revelation, in a movement that was called "Montanism" because it had been initiated by Montanus and his female disciples, and the gnostic teachings of Valentinus. Early attacks upon alleged heresies formed the matter of Tertullian's Prescription Against Heretics (in 44 chapters, written from Rome), and of Irenaeus' Against Heresies (c. 180, in five volumes), written in Lyons after his return from a visit to Rome. The letters of Ignatius of Antioch and Polycarp of Smyrna to various churches warned against false teachers, and the Epistle of Barnabas, accepted by many Christians as part of Scripture in the 2nd century, warned about mixing Judaism with Christianity, as did other writers, leading to decisions reached in the first ecumenical council, which was convoked by the Emperor Constantine at Nicaea in 325, in response to further disruptive polemical controversy within the Christian community, in that case Arian disputes over the nature of the Trinity.

During those first three centuries, Christianity was effectively outlawed by requirements to venerate the Roman emperor and Roman gods. Consequently, when the Church labelled its enemies as heretics and cast them out of its congregations or severed ties with dissident churches, it remained without the power to persecute them. However, those called "heretics" were also called a number of other things (e.g. "fools", "wild dogs", "servants of Satan"), so the word "heretic" had negative associations from the beginning, and intentionally so.

Before 325 AD, the "heretical" nature of some beliefs was a matter of much debate within the churches. After 325 AD, some opinion was formulated as dogma through the canons promulgated by the councils.

== Medieval theology ==
=== Byzantine theology ===
While the Western Roman Empire declined and fell, the Eastern Roman Empire, centred on Constantinople, remained standing until 1453, and was the home of a wide range of theological activity that was seen as standing in strong continuity with the theology of the Patristic period; indeed the division between Patristic and Byzantine theology would not be recognised by many Orthodox theologians and historians.

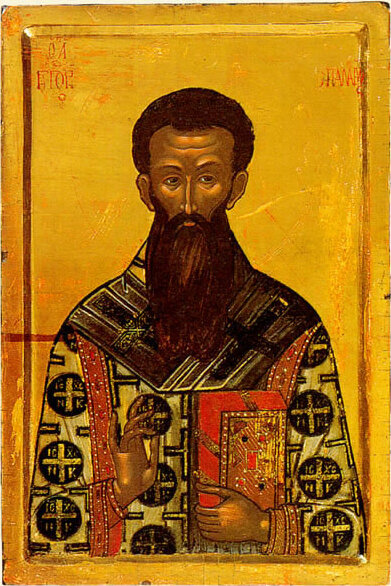
Gregory Palamas

=== Mystical theology ===
- Pseudo-Dionysius the Areopagite (working c. 500)
- Symeon the New Theologian (949–1022)
- Gregory Palamas (1296–1359)

=== Christological controversy after Chalcedon ===
- Severus of Antioch (c. 465–518)
- Leontius of Jerusalem (working 538–544)
- Maximus the Confessor (c. 580–682)

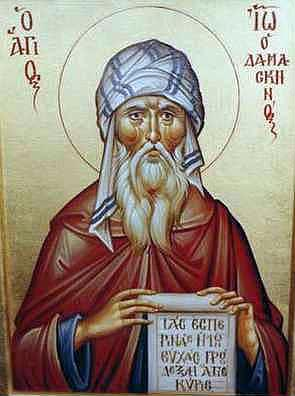
John of Damascus

=== Iconoclasts and iconophiles ===
- Patriarch Germanus I of Constantinople (patriarch 715–730)
- John of Damascus (676–749)
- Theodore the Studite (c. 758 – c. 826)

== Heresies ==
- Adoptionism
- Antinomianism
- Apollinarism
- Arianism
- Arminianism
- Audianism
- Bogomils
- Bosnian Church
- Catharism
- Docetism
- Donatism
- Ebionites
- Euchites
- Free Spirit
- Gnosticism
- Henry the Monk
- Iconoclasm
- Jansenism
- Luciferianism
- Lollardy
- Mandaeism
- Manichaeism
- Marcionism
- Monarchianism
- Monophysitism
- Monothelitism
- Montanism
- Muhammadism (Islam)
- Neo-ultramontanism
- Nestorianism
- Ophites
- Patripassianism
- Paulicianism
- Pelagianism
- Peter of Bruis
- Phyletism
- Priscillianism
- Psilanthropism
- Sabellianism
- Semipelagianism in Roman Catholicism
- Socinianism
- Ultramontanism in Orthodoxy
- Waldensians

== Western theology ==
=== Before the Carolingian Empire ===
When the Western Roman Empire fragmented under the impact of various 'barbarian' invasions, the Empire-wide intellectual culture that had underpinned late Patristic theology had its interconnections cut. Theology tended to become more localised, more diverse, and more fragmented. The classical Christianity preserved in Italy by men like Boethius and Cassiodorus was different from the vigorous Frankish Christianity documented by Gregory of Tours which was different again from the Christianity that flourished in Ireland and Northumbria in the 7th and 8th centuries. Throughout this period, theology tended to be a more monastic affair, flourishing in monastic havens where the conditions and resources for theological learning could be maintained.

Important writers include:

- Caesarius of Arles (c. 468–542)
- Boethius (480–524)
- Cassiodorus (c. 480 – c. 585)
- Pope Gregory I (c. 540–604)
- Isidore of Seville (c. 560–636)
- Bede (672–736)

=== Theology in the time of Charlemagne ===
Both because it made communication between different Christian centres easier, and because there was a concerted effort by its rulers to encourage educational and religious reforms and to develop greater uniformity in Christian thought and practice across their territories, the establishment of the Carolingian Empire saw an explosion of theological inquiry, and theological controversy. Controversy flared, for instance, around 'Spanish Adoptionism, around the views on predestination of Gottschalk, or around the eucharistic views of Ratramnus.

Important writers include:

- Alcuin (c. 735–804)
- The Spanish Adoptionists Felix of Urgel and Elipandus of Toledo (late 8th century)
- Rabanus Maurus (c. 780–856)
- Radbertus (c. 790–865)
- Ratramnus (died c. 868)
- Hincmar (806–882)
- Gottschalk (c. 808 – c. 867)
- Johannes Scotus Eriugena (c. 815–877)

=== Before Scholasticism ===
With the division and decline of the Carolingian Empire, notable theological activity was preserved in some of the cathedral schools that had begun to rise to prominence under it—for instance at Auxerre in the 9th century or Chartres in the 11th century. Intellectual influences from the Arabic world (including works of classical authors preserved by Islamic scholars) moved into the Christian West via Spain, influencing such theologians as Gerbert of Aurillac, who went on to become Pope Sylvester II and mentor to Otto III. (Otto was the fourth ruler of the Germanic Ottonian Holy Roman Empire, successor to the Carolingian Empire). A controversy about the meaning of the eucharist formed around Berengar of Tours in the 11th century which hinted of a new confidence in the intellectual investigation of the faith that foreshadowed the explosion of theological argument that was to take place in the 12th century.

Notable authors include:

- Heiric of Auxerre (c. 835–887)
- Remigius of Auxerre (c. 841–908)
- Gerbert of Aurillac (c. 950–1003)
- Fulbert of Chartres (died 1028)
- Berengar of Tours (c. 999–1088)
- Lanfranc (died 1089)

=== Scholasticism ===
==== Early scholasticism and its contemporaries ====
Anselm of Canterbury is sometimes misleadingly called the 'Father of Scholasticism' because of the prominent place that reason has in his theology; instead of establishing his points by appeal to authority, he presents arguments to demonstrate why it is that the things he believes on authority must be so. His approach, however, was not very influential in his time, and he kept his distance from the cathedral schools. Larger influences include: the production of the gloss on Scripture associated with Anselm of Laon, the rise to prominence of dialectic (middle subject of the medieval trivium) in the work of Abelard, and the production by Peter Lombard of a collection of Sentences or opinions of the Church Fathers and other authorities. Scholasticism proper can be thought of as the kind of theology that emerges when, in the cathedral schools and their successors, the tools of dialectic are pressed into use to comment upon, explain, and develop the gloss and the sentences.

Notable authors include:

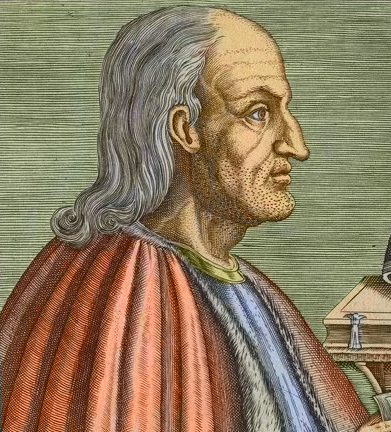
Anselm of Canterbury

- Anselm of Canterbury (1033/1034–1109)
- Anselm of Laon (died 1117)
- Hugh of St Victor (1078–1151)
- Peter Abelard (1079–1142)
- Bernard of Clairvaux (1090–1153)
- Hildegard of Bingen (1098–1179)
- Peter Lombard (c. 1100–1160)
- Joachim of Fiore (c. 1135–1202)

==== High Scholasticism and its contemporaries ====
The 13th century saw the attempted suppression of various groups perceived as heterodox, such as the Cathars and Waldensians and the associated rise of the mendicant orders (notably the Franciscans and Dominicans), in part intended as a form of orthodox alternative to the heretical groups. Those two orders quickly became contexts for some of the most intense scholastic theology, producing such 'high scholastic' theologians as Alexander of Hales (Franciscan) and Thomas Aquinas (Dominican), or the rather less obviously scholastic Bonaventure (Franciscan). The century also saw a flourishing of mystical theology, with women such as Mechthild of Magdeburg playing a prominent role. In addition, the century can be seen as a period in which the study of natural philosophy that could anachronistically be called 'science' began once again to flourish in theological soil, in the hands of such men as Robert Grosseteste and Roger Bacon.

Notable authors include:

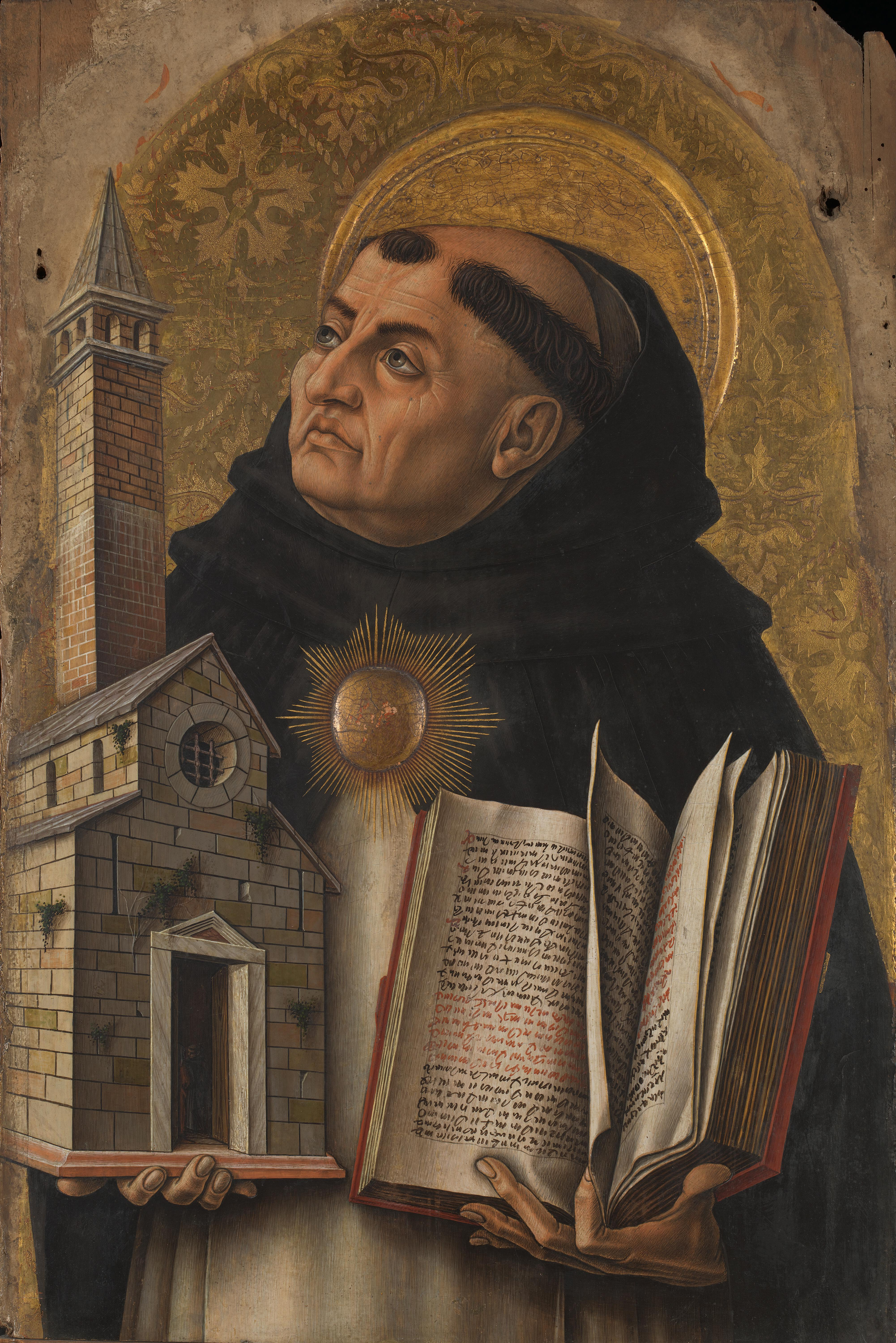
Aquinas

- Saint Dominic (1170–1221)
- Robert Grosseteste (c. 1175–1253)
- Francis of Assisi (1182–1226)
- Alexander of Hales (died 1245)
- Mechthild of Magdeburg (1210–1285)
- Roger Bacon (1214–1294)
- Bonaventure (1221–1274)
- Thomas Aquinas (1225–1274)
- Angela of Foligno (1248–1309)

==== Late Scholasticism and its contemporaries ====
Scholastic theology continued to develop as the 13th century gave way to the fourteenth, becoming ever more complex and subtle in its distinctions and arguments. The 14th century saw in particular the rise to dominance of the nominalist or voluntarist theologies of men like William of Ockham. The 14th century was also a time in which movements of widely varying character worked for the reform of the institutional church, such as conciliarism, Lollardy and the Hussites. Spiritual movements such as the Devotio Moderna also flourished.

Notable authors include:

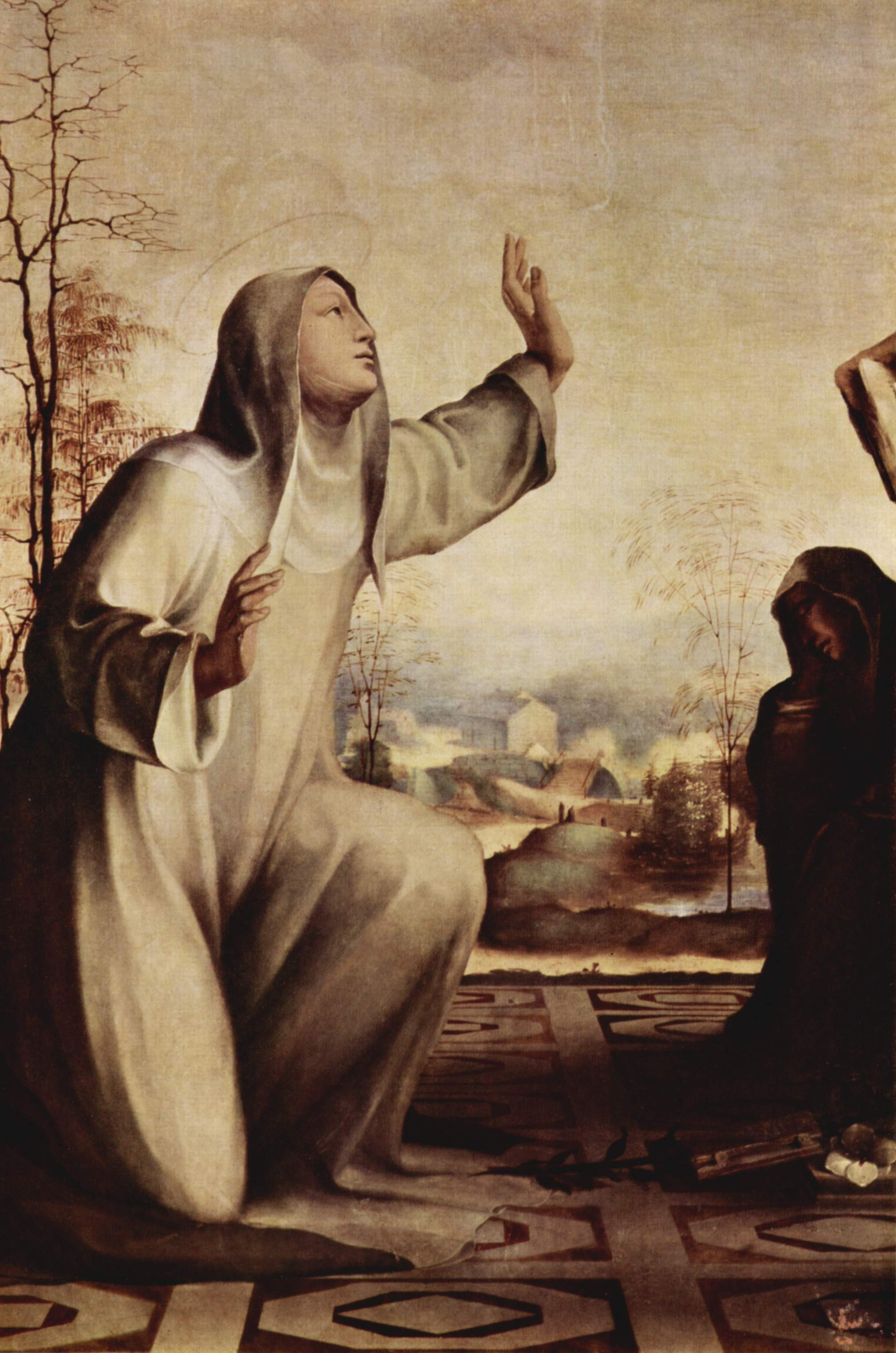
Depiction of Catherine of Siena

- Meister Eckhart (1260–1328)
- Duns Scotus (1266–1308)
- Marsilius of Padua (1270–1342)
- William of Ockham (c. 1285–1349)
- John Wycliffe (c. 1320–1384)
- Julian of Norwich (1342–1413)
- Geert Groote (1340–1384)
- Catherine of Siena (1347–1380)
- Jean Gerson (1363–1429)
- Jan Hus (c. 1369–1415)
- Thomas à Kempis (1380–1471)

== Renaissance and Reformation ==
The Renaissance yielded scholars the ability to read the scriptures in their original languages and this in part stimulated the Reformation. Martin Luther, a Doctor in Bible at the University of Wittenburg, began to teach that salvation is a gift of God's grace, attainable only through faith in Jesus, who in humility paid for sin. "This one and firm rock, which we call the doctrine of justification", insisted Martin Luther, "is the chief article of the whole Christian doctrine, which comprehends the understanding of all godliness." Along with the doctrine of justification, the Reformation promoted a higher view of the Bible. As Martin Luther said, "The true rule is this: God's Word shall establish articles of faith, and no one else, not even an angel can do so." These two ideas in turn promoted the concept of the priesthood of all believers. Other important reformers were John Calvin, Huldrych Zwingli, Philipp Melanchthon, Martin Bucer and the Anabaptists. Their theology was modified by successors such as Theodore Beza, the English Puritans and Francis Turretin.

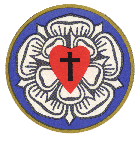
Luther's seal

=== Lutheranism ===
Lutheranism is a major branch of Western Christianity that identifies with the teachings of Luther. Luther's efforts to reform the theology and practice of the church launched The Reformation. As a result of the reactions of his contemporaries, Christianity was divided. Luther's insights were a major foundation of the Protestant movement.

==== The start of the Reformation ====
The sale of indulgences shown in A Question to a Mintmaker, woodcut by Jörg Breu the Elder of Augsburg, c. 1530

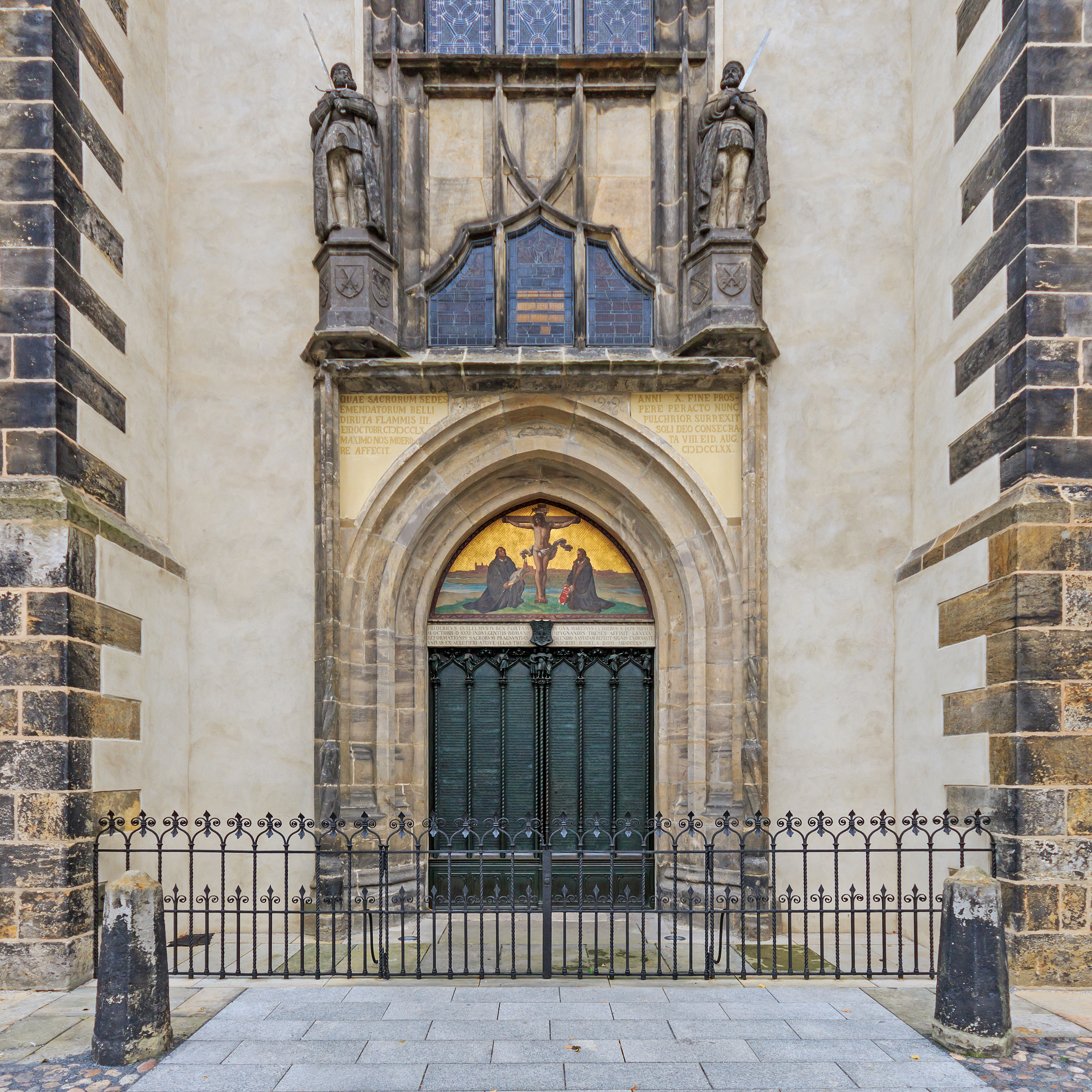
Door of the Schlosskirche (castle church) in Wittenberg to which Luther is said to have nailed his 95 Theses, sparking the Reformation

In 1516–1517, Johann Tetzel, a Dominican friar and papal commissioner for indulgences, was sent to Germany by the Roman Catholic Church to sell indulgences to raise money to rebuild St Peter's Basilica in Rome. Roman Catholic theology stated that faith alone, whether fiduciary or dogmatic, cannot justify man; and that only such faith as is active in charity and good works (fides caritate formata) can justify man. One such good work is donating money to the church.

On 31 October 1517, Luther wrote to Albrecht, Archbishop of Mainz and Magdeburg, protesting the sale of indulgences. He enclosed in his letter a copy of his "Disputation of Martin Luther on the Power and Efficacy of Indulgences", which came to be known as The 95 Theses. Hans Hillerbrand writes that Luther had no intention of confronting the church, but saw his disputation as a scholarly objection to church practices, and the tone of the writing is accordingly "searching, rather than doctrinaire". Hillerbrand writes that there is nevertheless an undercurrent of challenge in several of the theses, particularly in Thesis 86, which asks: "Why does the pope, whose wealth today is greater than the wealth of the richest Crassus, build the basilica of St. Peter with the money of poor believers rather than with his own money?"

Luther objected to a saying attributed to Johann Tetzel that "As soon as the coin in the coffer rings, the soul from purgatory springs", insisting that, since forgiveness was God's alone to grant, those who claimed that indulgences absolved buyers from all punishments and granted them salvation were in error. Christians, he said, must not slacken in following Christ on account of such false assurances.

According to Philipp Melanchthon, writing in 1546, Luther nailed a copy of the 95 Theses to the door of the Castle Church in Wittenberg that same day—church doors acting as the bulletin boards of his time—an event now seen as sparking the Protestant Reformation, and celebrated each year on 31 October as Reformation Day. Some scholars have questioned the accuracy of Melanchthon's account, noting that no contemporaneous evidence exists for it. Others have countered that no such evidence is necessary, because this was the customary way of advertising an event on a university campus in Luther's day.

The 95 Theses were quickly translated from Latin into German, printed, and widely copied, making the controversy one of the first in history to be aided by the printing press. Within two weeks, the theses had spread throughout Germany; within two months throughout Europe.

=== Justification by faith ===
From 1510 to 1520, Luther lectured on the Psalms, the books of Hebrews, Romans, and Galatians. As he studied these portions of the Bible, he came to view the use of terms such as penance and righteousness by the Roman Catholic Church in new ways. He became convinced that the church was corrupt in its ways and had lost sight of what he saw as several of the central truths of Christianity, the most important of which, for Luther, was the doctrine of justification—God's act of declaring a sinner righteous—by faith alone through God's grace. He began to teach that salvation or redemption is a gift of God's grace, attainable only through faith in Jesus as the messiah.

This one and firm rock, which we call the doctrine of justification", he wrote, "is the chief article of the whole Christian doctrine, which comprehends the understanding of all godliness.

— Herbert J. A. Bouman, Concordia Theological Monthly "The Doctrine of Justification in the Lutheran Confessions (Nov. 26, 1955), No. 11:801

Luther came to understand justification as entirely the work of God. Against the teaching of his day that the righteous acts of believers are performed in cooperation with God, Luther wrote that Christians receive such righteousness entirely from outside themselves; that righteousness not only comes from Christ but actually is the righteousness of Christ, imputed to Christians (rather than infused into them) through faith. "That is why faith alone makes someone just and fulfills the law", he wrote. "Faith is that which brings the Holy Spirit through the merits of Christ." Faith, for Luther, was a gift from God. He explained his concept of "justification" in the Smalcald Articles:

The first and chief article is this: Jesus Christ, our God and Lord, died for our sins and was raised again for our justification (Romans 3:24-25). He alone is the Lamb of God who takes away the sins of the world (John 1:29), and God has laid on Him the iniquity of us all (Isaiah 53:6). All have sinned and are justified freely, without their own works and merits, by His grace, through the redemption that is in Christ Jesus, in His blood (Romans 3:23-25). This is necessary to believe. This cannot be otherwise acquired or grasped by any work, law or merit. Therefore, it is clear and certain that this faith alone justifies us ... Nothing of this article can be yielded or surrendered, even though heaven and earth and everything else falls (Mark 13:31).

— Martin Luther, Concordia: The Lutheran Confessions "The Smalcald Articles", Part two, Article 1

=== Response of the papacy ===
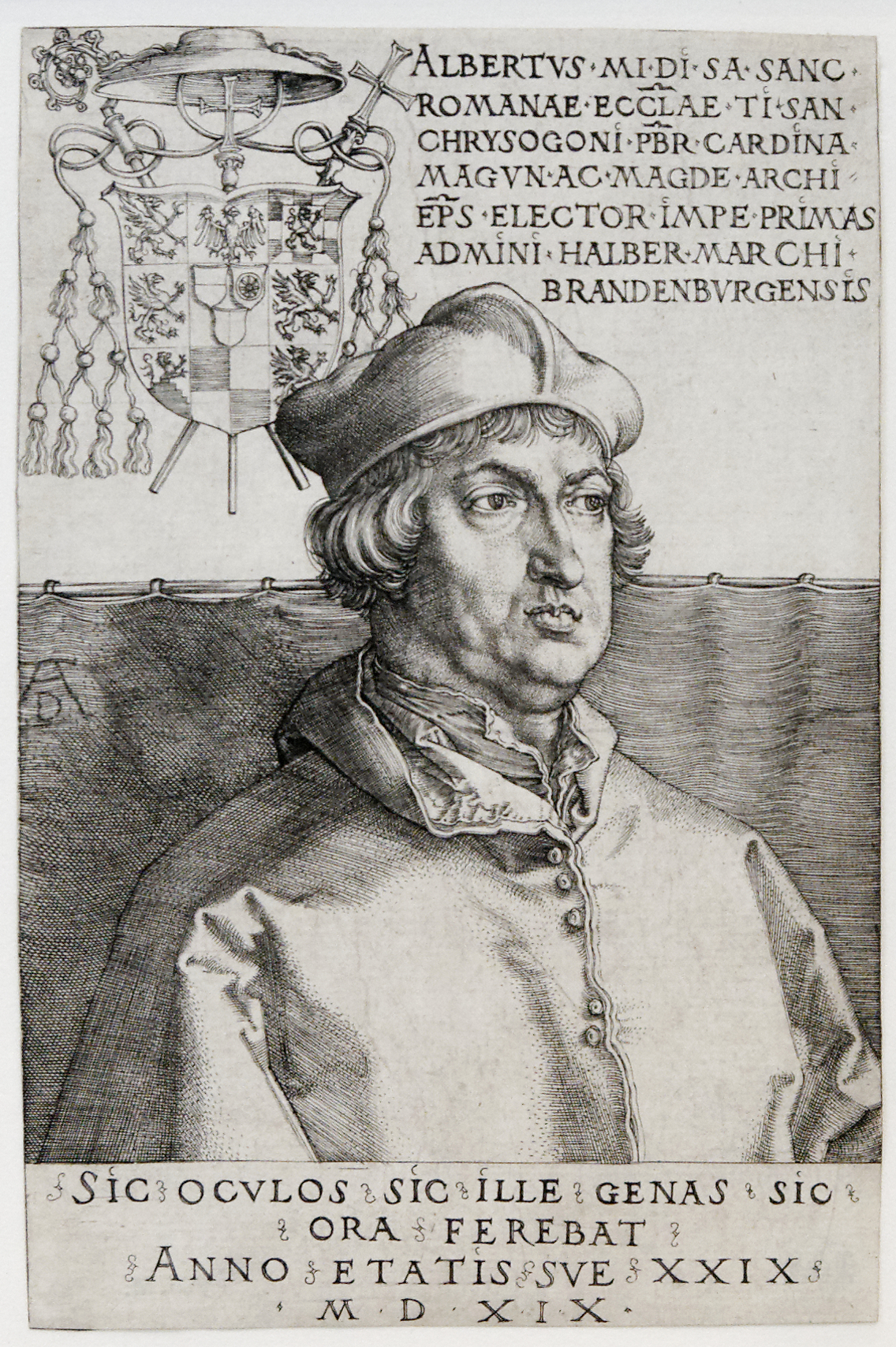
Cardinal Albrecht of Hohenzollern, Archbishop of Mainz and Magdeburg, was using part of the indulgence income to pay bribery debts; portrait by Albrecht Dürer, 1519

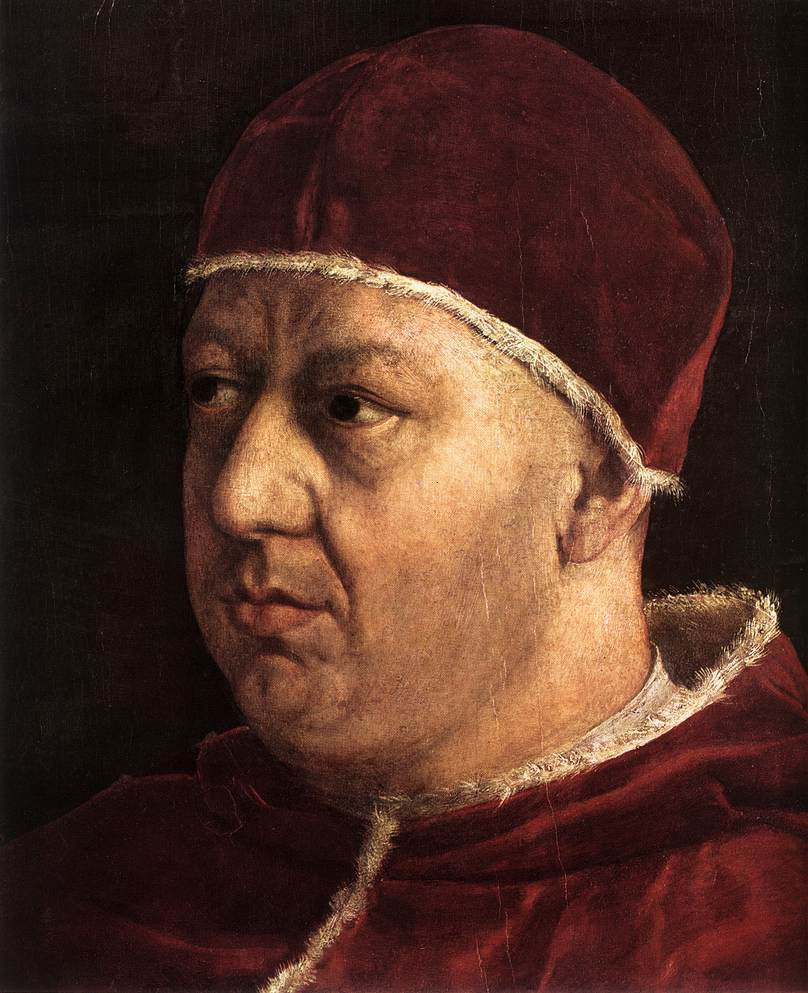
Pope Leo X by Raphael

In contrast to the speed with which the theses were distributed, the response of the papacy was slow.

Cardinal Albrecht of Hohenzollern, Archbishop of Mainz and Magdeburg, with the consent of Pope Leo X, was using part of the indulgence income to pay his bribery debts, and did not reply to Luther's letter; instead, he had the theses checked for heresy and forwarded to Rome.

Leo responded over the next three years, "with great care as is proper", by deploying a series of papal theologians and envoys against Luther. He may have hoped the matter would die down of its own accord, because in 1518 he dismissed Luther as "a drunken German" who "when sober will change his mind".

=== Widening breach ===
Luther's writings circulated widely, reaching France, England, and Italy as early as 1519, and students thronged to Wittenberg to hear him speak. He published a short commentary on Galatians and his Work on the Psalms. At the same time, he received deputations from Italy and from the Utraquists of Bohemia; Ulrich von Hutten and Franz von Sickingen offered to place Luther under their protection.

This early portion of Luther's career was one of his most creative and productive. Three of his best known works were published in 1520: To the Christian Nobility of the German Nation, On the Babylonian Captivity of the Church, and On the Freedom of a Christian.

On 30 May 1519, when the Pope demanded an explanation, Luther wrote a summary and explanation of his theses to the Pope. While the Pope may have conceded some of the points, he did not like the challenge to his authority so he summoned Luther to Rome to answer these. At that point Frederick the Wise, the Saxon Elector, intervened. He did not want one of his subjects to be sent to Rome to be judged by the Catholic clergy so he prevailed on the Holy Roman Emperor Charles V, who needed Frederick's support, to arrange a compromise.

An arrangement was effected, however, whereby that summons was cancelled, and Luther went to Augsburg in October 1518 to meet the papal legate, Cardinal Thomas Cajetan. The argument was long but nothing was resolved.

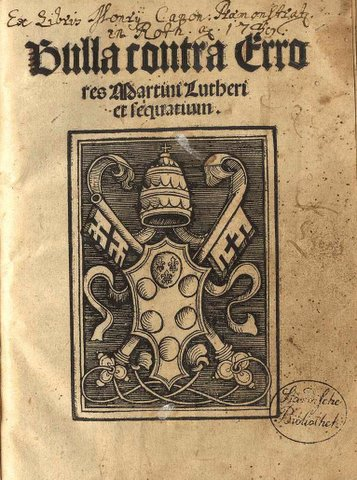
First edition of Exsurge Domine

=== Excommunication ===
On 15 June 1520, the Pope warned Luther with the papal bull (edict) Exsurge Domine that he risked excommunication unless he recanted 41 sentences drawn from his writings, including the 95 Theses, within 60 days.

That autumn, Johann Eck proclaimed the bull in Meissen and other towns. Karl von Miltitz, a papal nuncio, attempted to broker a solution, but Luther, who had sent the Pope a copy of On the Freedom of a Christian in October, publicly set fire to the bull and decretals at Wittenberg on 10 December 1520, an act he defended in Why the Pope and his Recent Book are Burned and Assertions Concerning All Articles.

As a consequence, Luther was excommunicated by Leo X on 3 January 1521, in the bull Decet Romanum Pontificem.

=== Political maneuvering ===
What had started as a strictly theological and academic debate had now turned into something of a social and political conflict as well, pitting Luther, his German allies and Northern European supporters against Charles V, France, the Italian Pope, their territories and other allies. The conflict would erupt into a religious war after Luther's death, fueled by the political climate of the Holy Roman Empire and strong personalities on both sides.

In 1526, at the First Diet of Speyer, it was decided that, until a General Council could meet and settle the theological issues raised by Martin Luther, the Edict of Worms would not be enforced and each Prince could decide if Lutheran teachings and worship would be allowed in his territories. In 1529, at the Second Diet of Speyer, the decision of the previous Diet of Speyer was reversed—despite the strong protests of the Lutheran princes, free cities and some Zwinglian territories. These states quickly became known as Protestants. At first, this term Protestant was used politically for the states that resisted the Edict of Worms. Over time, however, this term came to be used for the religious movements that opposed the Roman Catholic tradition in the 16th century.

Lutheranism would become known as a separate movement after the 1530 Diet of Augsburg, which was convened by Charles V to try to stop the growing Protestant movement. At the Diet, Philipp Melanchthon presented a written summary of Lutheran beliefs called the Augsburg Confession. Several of the German princes (and later, kings and princes of other countries) signed the document to define "Lutheran" territories. These princes would ally to create the Schmalkaldic League in 1531, which led to the Schmalkald War, 1547, a year after Luther's death, that pitted the Lutheran princes of the Schmalkaldic League against the Catholic forces of Charles V.

After the conclusion of the Schmalkald War, Charles V attempted to impose Catholic religious doctrine on the territories that he had defeated. However, the Lutheran movement was far from defeated. In 1577, the next generation of Lutheran theologians gathered the work of the previous generation to define the doctrine of the persisting Lutheran church. This document is known as the Formula of Concord. In 1580, it was published with the Augsburg Confession, the Apology of the Augsburg Confession, the Large and Small Catechisms of Martin Luther, the Smalcald Articles and the Treatise on the Power and Primacy of the Pope. Together they were distributed in a volume entitled The Book of Concord. This book is still used today.

=== Results of the Lutheran reformation ===
Luther's followers and the Roman Catholic Church broke fellowship during the Protestant Reformation. In the years and decades following Luther's posting of the 95 theses on the door of the Wittenberg church, large numbers of Europeans abandoned observance of papal authority, including the majority of German speakers. Following the Counter-Reformation, Catholic Austria and Bavaria, together with the electoral archbishops of Mainz, Cologne, and Trier consolidated the Catholic position on the German-speaking section of the European continent. Because Luther sparked this mass movement, he is known as the father of the Protestant Reformation, and the father of Protestantism in general.

=== Arminianism ===
- Humans are naturally unable to make any effort towards salvation
- Salvation is possible by grace alone
- Works of human effort cannot cause or contribute to salvation
- God's election is conditional on faith in Jesus
- Jesus' atonement was potentially for all people
- God allows his grace to be resisted by those unwilling to believe
- Salvation can be lost, as continued salvation is conditional upon continued faith

=== Orthodox Reformation ===
The fall of Constantinople in the East, 1453, led to a significant shift of gravity to the rising state of Russia, the "Third Rome". The Renaissance would also stimulate a program of reforms by patriarchs of prayer books. A movement called the "Old Believers" consequently resulted and influenced Russian Orthodox theology in the direction of conservatism and Erastianism.

== Counter-Reformation ==
The Roman Catholic Counter-Reformation spearheaded by the Jesuits under Ignatius Loyola took their theology from the decisions of the Council of Trent, and developed Second Scholasticism, which they pitted against Lutheran Scholasticism. The overall result of the Reformation was therefore to highlight distinctions of belief that had previously co-existed uneasily.

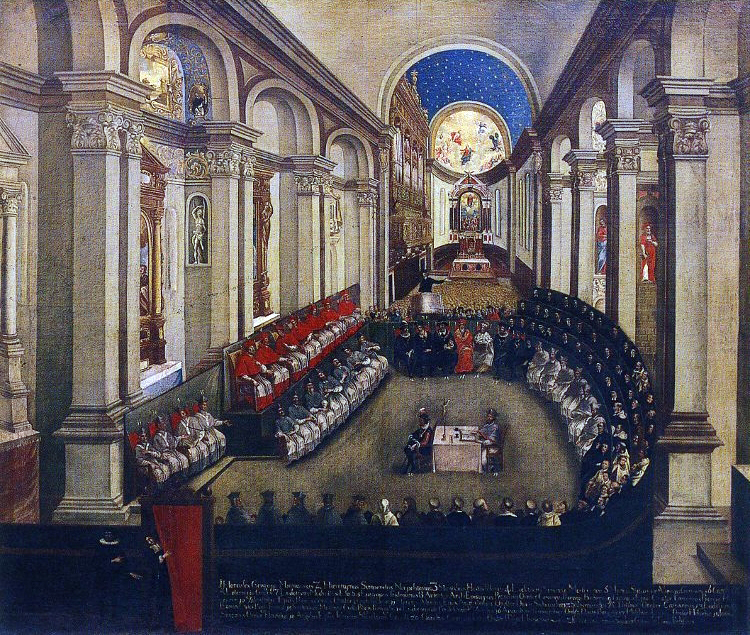
The Council in Santa Maria Maggiore church; Museo Diocesiano Tridentino, Trento

== Restoration Movement ==
The Restoration Movement (also known as the "Stone-Campbell Movement") generally refers to the "American Restoration Movement", which began on the American frontier during the Second Great Awakening of the early 19th century. The movement sought to reform the church and unite Christians. Barton W. Stone and Alexander Campbell each independently developed similar approaches to the Christian faith, seeking to restore the whole Christian church, on the pattern set forth in the New Testament. Both groups believed that creeds kept Christianity divided. They joined in fellowship in 1832 with a handshake. They were united, among other things, in the belief that Jesus is the Christ, the Son of God, that churches celebrate the Lord's Supper on the first day of each week, and that baptism of adult believers, by immersion in water, is a necessary condition for Salvation.

The Restoration Movement began as two separate threads, each of which initially developed without the knowledge of the other, during the Second Great Awakening in the early 19th century. The first, led by Barton W. Stone began at Cane Ridge, Bourbon County, Kentucky. The group called themselves simply Christians. The second, began in western Pennsylvania and Virginia (now West Virginia), led by Thomas Campbell and his son, Alexander Campbell. Because the founders wanted to abandon all denominational labels, they used the biblical names for the followers of Jesus that they found in the Bible. Both groups promoted a return to the purposes of the 1st century churches as described in the New Testament. One historian of the movement has argued that it was primarily a unity movement, with the restoration motif playing a subordinate role.

The Restoration Movement has seen several divisions, resulting in multiple separate groups. Three modern groups claim the Stone Campbell movement as their roots: Churches of Christ, Christian churches and churches of Christ, and the Christian Church (Disciples of Christ). Some see divisions in the movement as the result of the tension between the goals of restoration and ecumenism, with the Churches of Christ and Christian churches and churches of Christ resolving the tension by stressing restoration while the Christian Church (Disciples of Christ) resolved the tension by stressing ecumenism.

== Restorationism ==
- The Church of Jesus Christ of Latter-day Saints
- Jehovah's Witnesses

== Modern theology ==
After the Reformation Protestant groups continued to splinter, leading to a range of new theologies. The "Enthusiasts" were so named because of their emotional zeal. These included the Methodists, the Quakers and Baptists. Another group sought to reconcile Christian faith with "Modern" ideas, sometimes causing them to reject beliefs they considered to be illogical, including the Nicene Creed and Chalcedonian Creed. These included Unitarians and Universalists. A major issue for Protestants became the degree to which Man contributes to his salvation. The debate is often viewed as synergism versus monergism, though the labels Calvinist and Arminian are more frequently used, referring to the conclusion of the Synod of Dort.

The 19th century saw the rise of biblical criticism, new knowledge of religious diversity in other continents and above all the growth of science. This led many church men to espouse a form of Deism. This, along with concepts such as the brotherhood of man and a rejection of miracles led to what is called "Classic Liberalism". Immensely influential in its day, classic liberalism suffered badly as a result of the two world wars and the criticisms of postmodernism.

Vladimir Lossky is an Eastern Orthodox theologian writing in the 20th century for the Greek church.

== Modern Catholic response to Protestantism ==
Well into the 20th century, Catholics—even if no longer resorting to persecution—still defined Protestants as heretics. Thus, Hilaire Belloc—in his time one of the most conspicuous speakers for Catholicism in Britain—was outspoken about the "Protestant Heresy". He even defined Islam as being "A Christian heresy", on the grounds that Muslims accept many of the tenets of Christianity but deny the godhood of Jesus (see Hilaire Belloc#On Islam).

However, in the second half of the century—and especially in the wake of Vatican II—the Catholic Church, in the spirit of ecumenism, tends not to refer to Protestantism as a heresy, even if the teachings of Protestantism are heretical from a Catholic perspective. Modern usage favors referring to Protestants as "separated brethren" rather than "heretics", although the latter is still on occasion used vis-a-vis Catholics who abandon their church to join a Protestant denomination. Many Catholics consider Protestantism to be material rather than formal heresy, and thus non-culpable.

Some of the doctrines of Protestantism that the Catholic Church considers heretical are the belief that the Bible is the only source and rule of faith ("sola scriptura"), that faith alone can lead to salvation ("sola fide") and that there is no sacramental, ministerial priesthood attained by ordination, but only a universal priesthood of all believers.

== Postmodern Christianity ==
Postmodern theology seeks to respond to the challenges of post modern and deconstructionist thought, and has included the death of God movement, process theology, feminist theology and queer theology and most importantly neo-orthodox theology. Karl Barth, Rudolf Bultmann and Reinhold Niebuhr were neo-orthodoxies main representatives. In particular Barth labeled his theology "dialectical theology", a reference to existentialism.

The predominance of Classic Liberalism resulted in many reactionary movements amongst conservative believers. Evangelical theology, Pentecostal or renewal theology and fundamentalist theology, often combined with dispensationalism, all moved from the fringe into the academy. Marxism stimulated the significant rise of Liberation theology which can be interpreted as a rejection of academic theology that fails to challenge the establishment and help the poor.

From the late 19th century to the early 20th century, groups established themselves that derived many of their beliefs from Protestant evangelical groups but significantly differed in doctrine. These include the Jehovah's Witnesses, the Latter Day Saints and many so called "cults". Many of these groups use the Protestant version of the Bible and typically interpret it in a fundamentalist fashion, adding, however, special prophecy or scriptures, and typically denying the trinity and the full deity of Jesus Christ.

Ecumenical Theology sought to discover a common consensus on theological matters that could bring the many Christian denominations together. As a movement it was successful in helping to provide a basis for the establishment of the World Council of Churches and for some reconciliation between more established denominations. But ecumenical theology was nearly always the concern of liberal theologians, often Protestant ones. The movement for ecumenism was opposed especially by fundamentalists and viewed as flawed by many neo-orthodox theologians.

=== Radical orthodoxy ===
Radical orthodoxy is a form of philosophical theology that has been influenced by the Nouvelle Theologie, especially of Henri de Lubac.

An ecumenical movement begun by John Milbank and others at Cambridge, radical orthodoxy seeks to examine classic Christian writings and related neoplatonic texts in full dialogue with contemporary, philosophical perspectives. Predominantly Anglican and Roman Catholic in orientation, it has received positive responses from high places in those communions: one of the movement's founders, Catherine Pickstock, received a letter of praise from Joseph Ratzinger before he became Pope, while Rowan Williams, the Archbishop of Canterbury, has contributed to the movement's publications. A major source of radical orthodoxy remains the Centre of Theology and Philosophy at the University of Nottingham.

=== Weak theology ===
Weak theology is a branch of postmodern theology that has been influenced by the deconstructive thought of Jacques Derrida, including Derrida's description of a moral experience he calls "the weak force." Weak theology rejects the idea that God is an overwhelming physical or metaphysical force. Instead, God is an unconditional claim without any force whatsoever. As a claim without force, the God of weak theology does not intervene in nature. As a result, weak theology emphasizes the responsibility of humans to act in this world here and now. John D. Caputo is a prominent advocate of the movement.

== See also ==
- Catholic dogmatic theology
- History of Catholic theology
- History of Christian thought on persecution and tolerance
- History of Eastern Orthodox theology
  - History of Eastern Orthodox theology in the 20th century

== Sources ==
=== General ===
- Lindberg, Carter (2006). A Brief History of Christianity. Blackwell Publishing. ISBN 1-4051-1078-3.
- MacCulloch, Diarmaid (2010). Christianity: The First Three Thousand Years. Penguin Books. ISBN 978-1-101-18999-3.
- McGrath, Alister (2013). Christian History: An Introduction. Wiley-Blackwell. ISBN 9781118337806.
- McGrath, Alister (2023). Historical Theology: An Introduction to the History of Christian Thought (3rd ed.). Wiley Blackwell. ISBN 9781119870364. Archived from the original on 2024-12-16.
- Noll, Mark A. (1997). Turning Points: Decisive Moments in the History of Christianity. Baker Academic.
- Placher, William C.; Nelson, Derek R. (2013). A History of Christian Theology: An Introduction (2nd ed.). Louisville, Kentucky, US: Westminster John Knox Press. ISBN 978-0-664-23935-0.
- Reddish, Mitchell (2011). An Introduction to The Gospels. Abingdon Press. ISBN 978-1426750083.

=== Early Christianity ===
- Allison, Dale (2010). Constructing Jesus: Memory, Imagination, and History. Baker Academic. ISBN 978-0801035852.
- Bond, Helen K. (2012). The Historical Jesus: A Guide for the Perplexed. Bloomsbury Academic. ISBN 9780567125101.
- Dunn, James D. G. (2003). Jesus Remembered. Christianity in the Making. Vol. 1. Grand Rapids, Michigan: William B. Eerdmans Publishing Company. ISBN 978-0-8028-7799-4.
- Dunn, James D. G. (2009). New Testament Theology: An Introduction. Library of Biblical Theology. Abingdon Press. ISBN 978-0-687-34120-7.
- Ehrman, Bart D. (1999). Jesus: Apocalyptic Prophet of the New Millennium. New York: Oxford University Press. ISBN 978-0-19-512473-6.
- Fredriksen, Paula (1999). Jesus of Nazareth, King of the Jews: A Jewish Life and the Emergence of Christianity. Vintage Books. ISBN 0-679-76746-0.
- González, Justo L. (1987). A History of Christian Thought. Vol. 1: From the Beginnings to the Council of Chalcedon (revised ed.). Abingdon Press. ISBN 0-687-17182-2.
- Johnson, Luke Timothy (2010). The Writings of the New Testament: An Interpretation (3rd ed.). Minneapolis, Minnesota: Fortress Press. ISBN 978-0-8006-6361-2.
- Lampe, G. W. H. (1978). "Christian Theology in the Patristic Period". In Cunliffe-Jones, Hubert (ed.). A History of Christian Doctrine. T & T Clark. pp. 23–180. ISBN 0567043932.
- Lynch, Joseph H. (2010). Early Christianity: A Brief History. Oxford University Press. ISBN 9780195138559.
- Marcus, Joel (2006). "Jewish Christianity". In Mitchell, Margaret M.; Young, Frances M. (eds.). The Cambridge History of Christianity. Vol. 1: Origins to Constantine. Cambridge University Press. pp. 87–102. doi:10.1017/CHOL9780521812399. ISBN 9781139054836.
- Osiek, Carolyn (2017). "The Apostolic Fathers". In Esler, Philip F. (ed.). The Early Christian World. Vol. 1 (2nd ed.). Routledge. pp. 529–546. ISBN 9781351678292. Archived from the original on 2024-12-16.
- Pelikan, Jaroslav (1971). The Christian Tradition: A History of the Development of Doctrine. Vol. 1: The Emergence of the Catholic Tradition (100-600). University of Chicago Press. ISBN 9780226028163.
- Schnelle, Udo (2020). The First One Hundred Years of Christianity: An Introduction to Its History, Literature, and Development. Translated by Thompson, James W. Grand Rapids, Michigan: Baker Academic. ISBN 978-1-4934-2242-5.
- Stuhlmacher, Peter (2018). Biblical Theology of the New Testament. Translated by Bailey, Daniel P. William B. Eerdmans. ISBN 978-0-8028-4080-6.
- Wright, N. T. (1992). The New Testament and the People of God. Christian Origins and the Question of God. Vol. 1. Fortress Press. ISBN 978-0-281-04593-8.
