= Aristides of Athens =

2nd-century Christian Greek author

Saint Aristides the Athenian
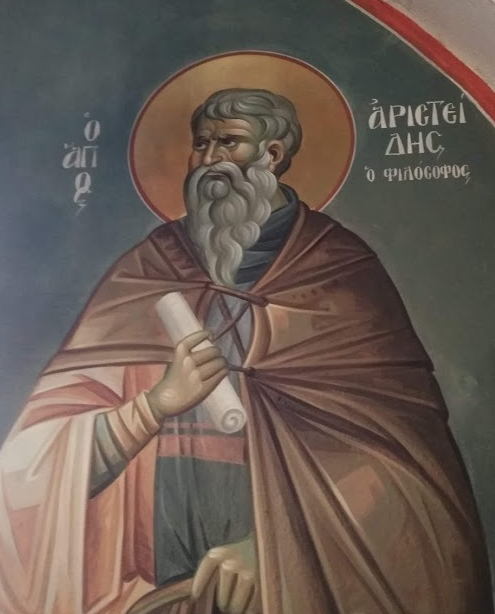
- Aristides the Athenian

Apologist
- Born: unknown Athens, Achaea, Roman Empire
- Died: 133-134; Athens, Achaea, Roman Empire
- Venerated in: Catholic Church; Eastern Orthodox Church
- Feast: 31 August (Catholic Church); 13 September (Eastern Orthodox Church)

Aristides the Athenian (also known as Saint Aristides or Marcianus Aristides; Greek: Ἀριστείδης Μαρκιανός) was a Greek Christian author who is primarily known for authoring the Apology of Aristides in the 2nd century Revered as a saint, his feast day is August 31 in the Catholic Church and September 13 in the Eastern Orthodox Church.

== Biography ==
Very little is known of Aristides, except for the introductory information given by Eusebius of Caesarea and Saint Jerome, both writing in the 4th century AD. According to their account, Aristides practiced philosophy in Athens, where he lived, prior to and after his conversion to Christianity. Eusebius writes in his Ecclesiastical History (Book 4, Ch. 3): "Aristides also, a faithful disciple of our religion, has left an Apology of the faith dedicated to Hadrian." Eusebius and Jerome both state that the Apology was given to Hadrian at the same time that Quadratus delivered his own apology. This suggests that Aristides gave his apology during Hadrian's reign (r. 117–138 AD) as Roman emperor, which supports the theory that Aristides died between the years 133 and 134 AD. It is also supported by the express language of the Apology in the Armenian version. It is contradicted only by the second superscription to the Syriac version, which says that the Apology was given to Emperor Antoninus Pius in the year 140. If this is taken to mean that it was delivered in person by Aristides, it would rule out the dating of Aristides's death in 133-134 AD. It has been suggested that Eusebius was confused by the fact that Antoninus Pius, adopted by Hadrian as his son and successor, had also taken the name "Hadrianus" (Caesar Titus Aelius Hadrianus Antoninus Augustus Pius), and believed it was Hadrian to whom the Apology was given, and further that Jerome had never read the Apology and copied Eusebius's mistake accidentally. But Jerome tells us that the Apology was extant in his day, and he gives an account of its contents. The testimony of Eusebius and Jerome and the text of the Armenian version are all in favor of its being delivered to Hadrian, probably in c. 124–125 AD.

His Apology is the oldest Christian apologetic work preserved until the Contemporary Era. Other apologists of the 2nd century include the following: St. Justin Martyr, Quadratus, Aristo of Pella, Tatian the Syrian, Miltiades, Apollinaris of Hierapolis, Athenagoras of Athens, Hermias, Theophilus of Antioch and Melito of Sardis.

== Writings ==
=== The Apology of Aristides ===
In 1878, an Armenian fragment of an apology titled To Emperor Hadrian Caesar from the Athenian Philosopher Aristides was published by the Mechitarists of San Lazzaro in Venice from a 10th-century manuscript. The Armenian translation was accepted by most scholars as the long lost Apology of Aristides; however, a few did dispute its authenticity, most notably Ernest Renan. In 1889, the authenticity of the fragment was confirmed with the discovery of a complete Syriac translation of the Apology by British scholar Rendel Harris in the Monastery of St. Catherine on Mount Sinai. With this new discovery, J.A. Robinson was able to show Aristides's work had been in fact extant and edited in the religious book The Life of Barlaam and Josaphat since the 7th century. Another fragment of the Apology containing two portions of original text in Greek was published in 1922 by the British Museum on papyri. The Apology of Aristides is the oldest extant Christian apology since only a fragment of the older apology of Quadratus exists.

In the 1889 Syriac translation, Aristides begins his apology by stating his name, where he is from and that he is delivering it to Antoninus Pius. In the first chapter, he proclaims God exists because the world exists and that God is "eternal, impassible and perfect." In the second chapter, he writes that there are four races of the world; (1) Barbarians, (2) Greeks (includes Egyptians and Chaldeans), (3) Jews, and (4) Christians. He then devotes chapters 3–16 to describing the different groups of people and how they practice religion. The Barbarians (chapters 3–7) worship dead warriors and the elements of the Earth, which he claims are the works of God, therefore they do not know who the true God is. The Greeks (chapters 8–13) are next because:

"...they are wiser than the Barbarians but have erred even more than the Barbarians, in that they have introduced many gods that are made; and some of them they have represented as male and some of them as female; and in such a way that some of their gods were found to be adulterers and murderers, and jealous and envious, and angry and passionate, and murderers of fathers, and thieves and plunderers."

In other words, Aristides is calling the Greek gods corrupt, immoral and guilty of being human. He concludes his chapters on the Greeks by commenting on the religious beliefs of the Egyptians, who he claims are the most ignorant people on earth since they did not accept the beliefs of the Greeks or Chaldeans and instead worshiped gods modeled after plants and animals. The Jews (chapter 14) are only commented on in a concise manner. Aristides commends them for their worship of God as the Creator and almighty but claims they have gone "astray" because "their service is to angels and not to God, in that they observe sabbaths and new moons and the passover and the great fast, and the fast, and circumcision, and cleanness of meats: which things not even thus have they perfectly observed." In chapters 15 and 16, Aristides describes the commandments of God and claims Christians "walk in all humility and kindness, and falsehood is not found among them, and they love one another." He explains "they ask from Him petitions which are proper for Him to give and for them to receive: and thus they accomplish the course of their lives." He concludes the Apology in chapter 17 by requesting the emperor to stop persecuting the Christians and convert to their faith; where he ends with a nice description of the Christian life.

=== Other works ===
It has been suggested that Aristides is the author of the Epistle to Diognetus. This theory is supported by similar writing styles, descriptions of Christians, the treatment of Jews, as well as other similarities. Abbé H. Doulcet was primarily the leading voice of this theory in the late 19th century. The Epistle to Diognetus has been credited to Justin Martyr but without any sufficient evidence. Aristides is also credited with a sermon on Luke 23:43.

== Contribution to other authors ==
=== Relation to contemporaries ===
Aristides is the second Greek Christian apologetic of the 2nd century. His writing style and thesis are very similar to the likes of Quadratus, Aristo of Pella, Justin Martyr and the author of the Epistle to Diognetus. Jerome suggests Aristides's apology was the combined opinions of philosophers at the time and imitated by Justin Martyr afterwards. Negatively, Celsus used the Apology for his arguments against the Jews and "also certain features which he used in order to scoff at Providence." However, he was easily countered by Origen.

=== Influence on later writing ===
The Apology of Aristides was later adapted into the work The Life of Barlaam and Josaphat during the 7th century . In the book, the Apology is told by a pagan philosopher by the name of Nachor, a character in the legend of Barlaam and Josaphat. The unknown use of the Apology in the book allowed for the text to remain extant the entire time, and would come to influence Christian perception of Buddhism. Only with the rediscovery of the Apology in 1878 and 1889 did it reappear in history books. Rendel Harris, J.A. Robinson and few European scholars provided some commentary and studies of the text in the late 19th and early 20th centuries. There has been little revisionist history on the Apology of late, except for an article by G.C. O'Ceallaigh in 1958. He suggested the Apology was a Jewish work of the 2nd century and was then edited by a Christian writer in the 4th century to be a Christian apology. W. Fairweather, D.W. Palmer and Massey Hamilton Shepherd Jr. have used the Apology of Aristides, and other apologists' works, in order to support their theories on early Christian thought and Greek apologists of the 2nd century.

== See also ==
- Apology of Aristides
- Christian apologetics
- Early centers of Christianity#Greece
