= Apology of Aristides =

2nd century Christian text

The Apology of Aristides was written by the early Christian writer Aristides (fl. 2nd century). Until 1878, knowledge of Aristides was confined to some references in works by Eusebius of Caesarea and Saint Jerome. Eusebius said that he was an Athenian philosopher and that Aristides and another apologist, Quadratus, delivered their Apologies directly to Emperor Hadrian. Aristides is also credited with a sermon on Luke 23:43. He remained a philosopher after his conversion to Christianity working in Athens.

== Discovery of the Apology ==
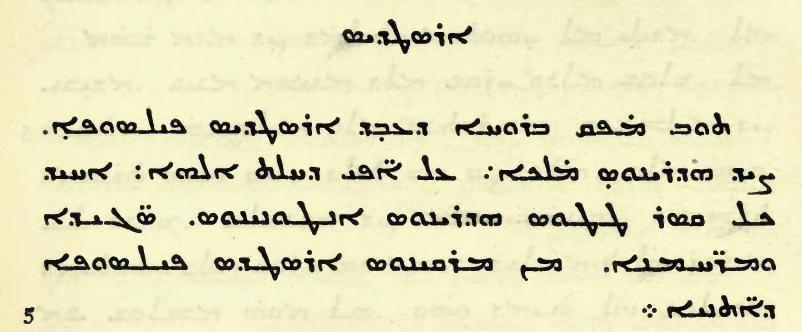
First Syriac words of the Apology of Aristides

In 1878, the Armenian monks of the Mechitarite convent in Venice published the first two chapters, which they had found in a manuscript in their collection in Armenian translation. This they accompanied with a Latin translation. Opinion as to the authenticity of the fragment was disputed, with Ernest Renan particularly vocal in opposition. Later, in 1889, J. Rendel Harris found the whole of it in a Syriac version at the Eastern Orthodox monastery of Saint Catherine's Monastery in Sinai, Egypt. While his edition was passing through the press, it was observed that the work had been extant in Greek the whole time, though in a slightly abbreviated form, since it had been embedded as a speech in a religious novel written around 1000 AD entitled The Life of Barlaam and Ioasaph. A further Armenian fragment was discovered in the library at Echmiadzin by F. C. Conybeare in a manuscript of the 11th century. The discovery of the Syriac version reopened the question of the date of the work. "Two very fragmentary third- or fourth-century Greek papyri serve as textual witnesses to the Apology."

== Content of the Apology ==
The Apology has a clear conceptual and ideological dependence on Aristotelianism, Middle Platonism and Stoicism, which the authors does not criticize at any time, something that would have pleased Hadrian, who was a student of philosophy and had been a listener of Epictetus.

Although its title corresponds to that given by the Armenian fragment and by Eusebius, it begins with a formal inscription to the emperor Titus Hadrianus Antoninus Augustus Pius. Dr. Rendel Harris is followed by Adolf von Harnack and others in supposing that it was only through a careless reading of this inscription that the work was supposed to have been addressed to Hadrian. If this be the case, it must be placed elsewhere in the long reign of Antoninus Pius (138-161 AD). There are, however, no internal grounds for rejecting the thrice-bested dedication to Hadrian, his predecessor, and the picture of things in it, that it is moved by compulsion:

I understood that he who moves them is God, who is hidden in them, and veiled by them. And it is manifest that that which causes motion is more powerful than that which is moved.

Having briefly spoken of the divine nature in the terms of Greek philosophy, Aristides proceeds to ask which of all the races of men have at all partaken of the truth about God. Here we have the first attempt at a systematic comparison of ancient religions. He adopts a threefold common division into idolaters, Jews and Christians. Idolaters, or, as he here gently terms them in addressing the emperor, "those who worship what among you are said to be gods," he subdivides into the three great world-civilizations: Chaldeans, Greeks and Egyptians. He chooses this order so as to work up to a climax of error and absurdity in heathen worship. The direct nature-worship of the Chaldeans is shown to be false because its objects are works of the Creator, fashioned for the use of men. They obey false laws and have no power over themselves. The Greeks had erred worse than the Chaldeans, "calling those gods who are no gods, according to their evil lusts, in order that having these as advocates of their wickedness they may commit adultery, rape, plunder and kill, and do the worst of deeds".

The gods of Olympus are challenged one by one, and shown to be either vile or helpless, or both at once. A heaven of quarrelling divinities cannot inspire a reasonable worship. These gods are not even respectable; how can they be adorable? The Egyptians have erred worse than all the nations; for they were not content with the worships of the Chaldeans and Greeks, but introduced, moreover, as gods even brute beasts of the dry land and of the waters, and plants and herbs Though they see their gods eaten by others and by men, and burned, and slain, and rotting, say they do not understand concerning them that they are no gods.

Throughout the whole of the argument there is strong common-sense criticism of the non-Christian religions and a stern severity unrelieved by conscious humour.

The Jews are briefly treated. After a reference to their descent from Abraham and their sojourn in Egypt, Aristides praises them for their worship of the one God, the Almighty creator; but blames them as worshipping angels, and observing "sabbaths and new moons, and the unleavened bread, and the great fast, and circumcision, and cleanness of meats". He then proceeds to the description of the Christians. He begins with a fragment which, when purged of glosses by a comparison of all three forms in which it survives, reads thus:

The Christians, then, trace the beginning of their religion from Jesus the Messiah; and he is named the Son of God Most High. And it is said that God came down from heaven, and from a Hebrew virgin assumed and clothed himself with flesh; and the Son of God lived in a daughter of man...This Jesus, then, was born of the race of the Hebrews; and he had twelve disciples in order that the purpose of his incarnation might in time be accomplished. But he himself was pierced by the Jews, and he died and was buried; and they say that after three days he rose and ascended to heaven. Thereupon these twelve disciples went forth throughout the known parts of the world, and kept showing his greatness with all modesty and uprightness. And hence also those of the present day who believe that preaching are called Christians, and they are become famous.

This passage contains a clear correspondence with the second section of the Apostles' Creed. The attribution of the Crucifixion to the Jews appears in several 2nd-century documents; Justin actually uses the words "He was pierced by you" in his Dialogue with Trypho, a Jew.

But the Christians, O King, while they went about and made search, have found the truth; and as we learned from their writings, they have come nearer to truth and genuine knowledge than the rest of the nations. For they know and trust in God, the Creator of heaven and of earth, in whom and from whom are all things, to whom there is no other god as companion, from whom they received commandments which they engraved upon their minds and observe in hope and expectation of the world which is to come. ...And if there is among them any that is poor and needy, and if they have no spare food, they fast two or three days in order to supply to the needy their lack of food. They observe the precepts of their Messiah with much care, living justly and soberly as the Lord their God commanded them. Every morning and every hour they give thanks and praise to God for His loving-kindnesses toward them...

This simple description is there in the Syriac, but the additional details must be accepted with caution: for while it is likely that the monk who appropriated the Greek may have cut it down, it is the habit of certain Syriac translators to elaborate their originals. After asserting that "this is the way of truth", and again referring for further information to the writings of the Christians, he says: "And truly this is a new way, and there is something divine mingled with it". At the close we have a passage which is found only in the Syriac, but which is shown by internal evidence to contain original elements: "Now the Greeks, O King, as they follow base practises in intercourse with males, and a mother and a sister and a daughter, impute their monstrous impurity in turn to the Christians." This is an allusion the charges of Thyestean banquets and other immoralities, which the early apologists constantly rebut.

But the Christians are just and good, and the truth is set before their eyes, and their spirit is long-suffering; and, therefore, though they know the error of these (the Greeks), and are persecuted by them, they bear and endure it; and for the most part they have compassion on them, as men who are destitute of knowledge. And on their side, they offer prayer that these may repent of their error; and when it happens that one of them has repented, he is ashamed before the Christians of the works which were done by him; and he makes confession to God, saying, I did these things in ignorance. And he purifies his heart, and his sins are forgiven him, because he committed them in ignorance in the former time, when he used to blaspheme and speak evil of the true knowledge of the Christians. And assuredly the race of the Christians is more blessed than all the men who are upon the face of the earth.

These last words point to the use in the composition of this apology of a hypothesized lost apocryphal work of very early date, The Preachings of Peter, known chiefly by quotations in Clement of Alexandria: it was widely circulated, and at one time claimed a place within the Canon. It was used by the Gnostic Heracleon and probably by the unknown writer of the Epistle to Diognetus. From the fragments which survive we know that it contained:

1. a description of the nature of God, which closely corresponds with Aristides' first chapter, followed by
2. a warning not to worship according to the Greeks, with an exposure of various forms of idolatry;
3. a warning not to worship according to the Jews – although they alone think they know the true God – for they worship angels and are superstitious about moons and sabbaths, and feasts (compare Arist. ch. 14);
4. a description the Christians as being "a third race", and worshipping God "in a new way" through Christ;
5. a proof of Christianity by Jewish prophecy;
6. a promise of forgiveness to Jews and Gentiles who should turn to Christ, because they had sinned in ignorance in the former time.

These points, except the proof from Jewish prophecy, are thought to have been taken up and worked out by Aristides through use of the actual language of the Preaching of Peter. A criterion is thus provided for the construction of the Apology based on the abbreviated Greek and thus the passages of the Syriac which might otherwise be suspected interpolations.

== See also ==
- Early centers of Christianity
