= Gerald R. Cragg =

British church historian

- Born: 8 January 1906
- Died: 13 May 1976 (aged 70)

Philosophical work
- Region: Western philosophy
- School: Church history; Enlightenment theology
- Main interests: Church history, History of Christian thought
- Notable works: The Church and the Age of Reason; Reason and Authority in the Eighteenth Century; Freedom and Authority

Gerald Robertson Cragg (8 January 1906 – 13 May 1976) was a British historian and theologian and Browm Professor of Ecclesiastical History at the Andover Newton Theological School in Massachusetts, known for his work on church history and the intellectual developments of the Enlightenment period.

== Books ==
- The Church and the Age of Reason, 1648-1789 (Penguin / Pelican, 1960).
- Reason and Authority in the Eighteenth Century (Cambridge University Press, 1964).
- Freedom and Authority: A Study of English Thought in the Early Seventeenth Century (Westminster Press, 1975).
