= Quadratus of Athens =

Christian apologist and saint

Saint Quadratus of Athens
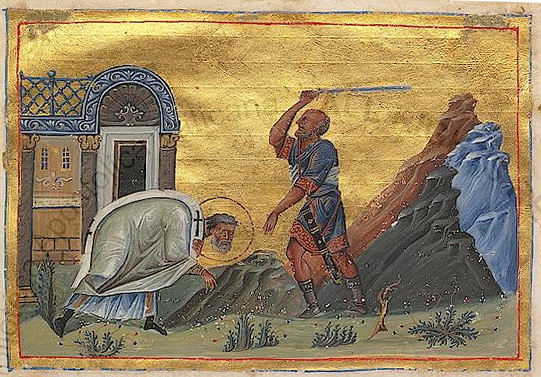
- Martyrdom of Saint Quadratus depicted in the 11th-century Menologion of Basil II.

Bishop of Athens, Apologist
- Born: 44 CE; Likely Asia Minor
- Died: 129 CE; Athens, Province of Achaia, Roman Empire
- Venerated in: Catholic Church, Eastern Orthodox Church
- Canonized: Pre-Congregation
- Feast: 21 September (Catholic Church and Eastern Orthodox Church)
- Patronage: Apologists

Quadratus of Athens (Ancient Greek: Κοδρᾶτος; fl. 2nd century) was an early Christian apologist, traditionally regarded as a disciple of the Apostles and one of the Seventy Disciples. He is best known for presenting an apology to Emperor Hadrian during his visit to Athens around 124–125 CE. His work included a defense of the Christian faith against its critics, what he saw as the enduring impact of Jesus' miracles.

Quadratus is also associated with the apostolic tradition and is recognized as the Bishop of Athens, succeeding Saint Publius. His feast day is observed on September 21 in the Catholic Church and the Eastern Orthodox Church.

== Life ==
=== Background ===
Quadratus was born near the end of the first century CE, likely in the region of Asia Minor. According to James Wallace, his year of birth is estimated to be around 60 CE.

Church historian Eusebius of Caesarea wrote that Quadratus was a disciple of the Apostles (auditor apostolorum), as noted in Chronicon. In his early years, he traveled as an itinerant preacher, spreading the Gospel and journeying through regions such as Asia Minor.

Later, after settling in Athens, Quadratus, much like other Athenian apologists such as Aristides and Athenagoras, did not hold a formal position within the Church hierarchy. Instead, he was an independent teacher, freely sharing his knowledge and faith. According to Robert and Andrew Foulis (1754) they refer to Quadratus and Aristides as former philosophers.

=== Apology ===
Eusebius's Ecclesiastical History (Book IV, Chapter 3) states that Quadratus delivered an Apology to Emperor Hadrian during his Athens visit in 124–125 CE. This defense of Christianity targeted critics and circulated widely in early Christian circles. Eusebius lauded his work because of its intellect and adherence to apostolic doctrine. The sole surviving fragment discusses Jesus's miracles with it reading:

Our Saviour's works, moreover, were always present: for they were real, consisting of those who had been healed of their diseases, those who had been raised from the dead; who were not only seen while they were being healed and raised up, but were afterwards constantly present. Nor did they remain only during the sojourn of the Saviour on earth, but also a considerable time after His departure; and, indeed, some of them have survived even down to our own times.

=== Bishop of Athens ===
Dionysius of Corinth wrote that Quadratus was appointed Bishop of Athens following the martyrdom of Saint Publius. The letter states that through Quadratus' zeal, the Athenian Christians were reunited, and their faith was revitalized. Based on this reading, he became the third Bishop of Athens sometime during the first half of the second century. Although this claim is disputed as the third office Bishop was held around 180 CE, surpassing his approximate death year of 130 CE.

== Identity and attribution ==
The identity and attribution of work relating to Quadratus of Athens has been a subject of scholarly debate.

=== Identity ===
Theologian Otto Bardenhewer, in Patrology (1908), proposed that Quadratus the Apologist might be the same person as Quadratus, a prophet mentioned by Eusebius in Ecclesiastical History (3.37). However, this identification has been questioned, with the Catholic Encyclopedia (1913) dismissing the evidence as insufficient. Efforts to associate Quadratus' Apology with the Letter to Diognetus, martyr accounts, or the Barlaam and Josaphat legend have similarly failed to yield convincing evidence.

The identification of Quadratus the Apologist with Quadratus, the Bishop of Athens, remains uncertain due to chronological inconsistencies. While The Oxford Dictionary of the Christian Church suggests the possibility of this link, Jerome erroneously conflated the Apologist with the Bishop who served during Marcus Aurelius' reign (161–180). Eusebius' claim that Quadratus was a prophet and apostolic disciple is also considered improbable.

Similarly, attempts to link Quadratus the Apologist with Quadratus, the Bishop of Athens, who served around 180 CE, face challenges due to chronological discrepancies. Nonetheless, The Oxford Dictionary of the Christian Church argues that "there is perhaps no compelling reason to reject his identification with the Bishop of Athens."

=== Attribution ===
In 1947, P. Andriessen proposed that Quadratus' Apology might be the work known as the Epistle to Diognetus, a theory that Michael W. Holmes later described as "intriguing". Holmes noted that, although the Epistle to Diognetus does not contain the sole known quotation from Quadratus' address, there exists a gap between chapters 7.6 and 7.7 where it could potentially fit. However, Edgar J. Goodspeed found this theory improbable, stating that the fragment does not align with the gap.

== Beliefs ==
Quadratus’s surviving language has been interpreted as implying Christ’s pre-existence and portraying his earthly life as temporary. He appealed to reports of people said to have been healed or raised from the dead by Jesus as continuing testimony to Jesus’s power.

Quadratus also referred to Jesus as "Soter" ("Savior"), a title used in Jewish and Greco-Roman epithets. Eusebius described Quadratus as orthodox and consistent with apostolic teaching. John H. Roller has argued that Quadratus’s views are compatible with Christian conditionalism.

== Death and legacy ==
According to tradition, his preaching to pagans resulted in imprisonment where he died of starvation around the year 129 CE. Quadratus is remembered as one of the earliest Christian apologists, known for presenting a defense of Christianity during Hadrian’s reign. His Apology reflects early Christian engagement with Roman officials and educated critics. Eusebius portrays him as intelligent and orthodox.

=== Feast day ===
Quadratus is recognized as one of the early saints of the Catholic Orthodox Christian Church and one of the Seventy Apostles. His feast day is celebrated annually on September 21st, and he is also commemorated on January 4th alongside the other Seventy Apostles.

== See also ==
- Early centers of Christianity § Greece

Catholic Church Titles
Preceded by Publius	Bishop of Athens; 125–129	Succeeded by Leonidas
