= Udo Schnelle =

German biblical scholar and Lutheran theologian (born 1952)

Udo Schnelle (born 8 September 1952) is a German biblical scholar and Lutheran theologian, who serves as Professor of New Testament at the Martin Luther University of Halle-Wittenberg, and is the author of a number of theological works.

Schnelle studied from 1974 to 1979 at the University of Göttingen, where he graduated in 1981 and obtained his habilitation in 1985. From 1986 to 1992, he was Professor of New Testament studies at the Martin Luther University of Halle-Wittenberg and has continued to teach there from 1992 onwards. Since 2014, he is president of the research association Studiorum Novi Testamenti Societas.

== Publications ==
- Apostle Paul: His Life and Theology (1st ed.). Ada, Michigan: Baker Academic. 2005 [2003]. ISBN 9781441242006. LCCN 2005025534.
- History and Theology of the New Testament Writings, trans. Boring, Minneapolis 1998, ISBN 978-0-8006-2952-6
- Theology of the New Testament, trans. Boring, Grand Rapids 2009, ISBN 978-0-8010-3604-0
