= Epistle to Diognetus =

2nd century Christian apologetic text

The Epistle to Diognetus (Greek: Πρὸς Διόγνητον Ἐπιστολή) is an example of Christian apologetics, writings defending Christianity against the charges of its critics. The Greek writer and recipient are not otherwise known. Estimates of dating based on the language and other textual evidence have ranged from AD 130 (which would make it one of the earliest examples of apologetic literature), to the general era of Melito of Sardis, Athenagoras of Athens, and Tatian.

== Author and audience ==
Sometimes the epistle is assigned the title 'Epistle of Mathetes to Diognetus'. The text itself does not identify the author. The word "mathetes" is the Greek word for "student" or "disciple", and it appears only once in the text, when the author calls himself a "student of the Apostles" (ἀποστόλων γενομένος μαθητής). Hence it is not a proper name at all, and its use in the title is strictly conventional. The writer, whoever he or she was, sounds to many like a Johannine Christian, inasmuch as he uses the word "Logos" as a substitute for "Christ" or "Jesus".

Scholars have suggested individuals who could be the addressee of the Letter to Diognetus, one implausible (one of the emperor Marcus Aurelius' tutors), the other quite possible (an Alexandrian procurator, Tiberios Claudios Diognetos, c. 200). Charles E. Hill cites an inscription from Smyrna, probably from the second century, by ‘Diognetos, son of Apollonius, son of Diognetos, archon’. This is evidence of an aristocratic family in Smyrna during the time of Polycarp, of which at least two members bore the name Diognetos. At least one of these two was a member of the city council, a status that would make the term κράτιστος, used of the addressee of the Letter to Diognetus, very appropriate. It is entirely possible, without verification of the author, that we have a fictitious character, since the name "Diognetus", means "God-born" in Greek.

== Manuscripts ==
The epistle survived only in one manuscript, initially discovered in 1436 being used as wrapping paper in a fish market in Constantinople. It was part of a 13th-century codex that included writings ascribed to Justin Martyr. The manuscript was mostly intact, exhibiting damage only in one place, several lines in the middle of the text.

It was first published in 1592, and attributed to Justin Martyr because of the context of its discovery. The original was subsequently destroyed in a fire during the Franco-Prussian War in 1870, but numerous transcriptions of the letter survive today.

Oddly, there is no evidence that any Apostolic Father or Church Father knew of its existence, even though it has been esteemed by many modern readers as a gem of early Christian apologetics. It has been suggested that the Epistle should be identified with the Apology of Quadratus of Athens, mentioned by Eusebius in his Church History, but this is disputed among scholars (see below).

== Contents ==
The Epistle has twelve chapters:

- Chapter I: Occasion of the Epistle.
- Chapter II: The Vanity of Idols.
- Chapter III: Superstitions of the Jews.
- Chapter IV: The Other Observances of the Jews.
- Chapter V: The Manners of the Christians.
- Chapter VI: The Relation of Christians to the World.
- Chapter VII: The Manifestation of Christ.
- Chapter VIII: The Miserable State of Men Before the Coming of the Word.
- Chapter IX: Why the Son Was Sent So Late.
- Chapter X: The Blessings that Will Flow from Faith.
- Chapter XI: These Things are Worthy to Be Known and Believed.
- Chapter XII: The Importance of Knowledge to True Spiritual Life.

The 10th chapter breaks off in mid thought. When the text resumes, the epistolary style has been abandoned and the final two chapters resemble a peroration. They are often considered to be later additions from the 3rd century. Some have attributed them to Hippolytus, based on similarities of thought and style. J.B. Lightfoot suggested that the final two chapters may have been written by Pantaenus in the mid-late second century.

== Theology ==
Some scholars believe the epistle is one of the earliest Church writings after the New Testament that portrays a forensic view of justification, describing Jesus as having "took upon Himself our sins", in a "sweet exchange" where "the iniquity of many should be concealed in One Righteous Man, and the righteousness of One should justify many that are iniquitous!" (Diognetus, chapter IX):

And when our iniquity had been fully accomplished, and it had been made perfectly manifest that punishment and death were expected as its recompense [...] He hated us not, neither rejected us, nor bore us malice, but was long-suffering and patient, and in pity for us took upon Himself our sins, and Himself parted with His own Son as a ransom for us, the holy for the lawless, the guileless for the evil, the just for the unjust For what else but His righteousness would have covered our sins? In whom was it possible for us lawless and ungodly men to have been justified, save only in the Son of God? O the sweet exchange, O the inscrutable creation, O the unexpected benefits; that the iniquity of many should be concealed in One Righteous Man, and the righteousness of One should justify many that are iniquitous!

== Possible identification ==
In 1947 Paulus Andriessen suggested that the Epistle to Diognetus is to be identified with the Apology of Quadratus of Athens, mentioned by Eusebius in his Church History. Eusebius not only mentions this Apology, but also provides a fragment of its contents. This fragment is not present in the text of the Epistle which has survived. The manuscript of this text, however, does not show the full text but has a gap. In 1966 Edgar J. Goodspeed wrote that the identification of the Epistle with the Apology mentioned by Eusebius is an ingenious theory. Goodspeed considered it improbable however, also stating that the fragment does not fit the gap.

In 2006, Michael W. Holmes has called Andriessen's proposal "intriguing": while admitting that Epistle to Diognetus does not contain the only quotation known from Quadratus's work, Holmes defends this identification by noting "there is a gap between 7.6 and 7.7 into which it would fit very well."

== Bibliography ==
- Crowe, Brandon D. 2011 "O Sweet Exchange! The Soteriological Significance of the Incarnation in the Epistle to Diognetus". Zeitschrift für die neutestamentliche Wissenschaft und die Kunde der älteren Kirche 102, no. 1: 96–109.
- Foster, Paul 2007. "The Epistle to Diognetus". Expository Times 118, no. 4: 162–68.
- Jefford, Clayton N. 2013 The Epistle to Diognetus (with Fragments of Quadratus): Introduction, Text and Commentary. Oxford Apostolic Fathers series. Oxford: Oxford University Press. ISBN 978-0-19921274-3
- Lienhard, Joseph T. 1970 "Christology of the Epistle to Diognetus". Vigiliae Christianae 24, no. 4: 280–89.
- Lona, Horacio E. 2001 "An Diognet", Übersetzt und erklärt, ed. by N. Brox, K. Niederwimmer, H. E. Lona, F. R. Prostmeier, and J. Ulrich. Kommentar zu frühchristlichen Apologeten series, KfA, Vol. 8. Verlag Herder: Freiburg u.a. ISBN 3-451-27679-8
- Nielsen, Charles Merritt 1970. "Epistle to Diognetus: Its Date and Relationship to Marcion". Anglican Theological Review 52, no. 2: 77–91.
