= Hermias (apologist) =

Christian philosopher

Hermias (/hɜːrˈmaɪəs/; sometimes Hermias Philosophus or Hermias the Philosopher; Ancient Greek: Ἑρμείας) was an obscure Christian apologist, presumed to have lived in 3rd century. Nothing is known of him, except his name. He wrote a Derision of gentile philosophers (Diasyrmos ton Exo Philosophon), a short parody on Greek philosophical themes (the nature of the body, the soul, the world). From Paul's statement in the First Epistle to the Corinthians that "all worldly knowledge is foolishness to God" he affirms that all philosophical doctrines come from the apostasy of the angels and therefore wrong and laughable. Hermias relies rather on cynical and skeptical culture critique and on philosophical biographies and anecdotes than in their real writings.

== See also ==
- Antiphilosophy
- Christian philosophy
- Metaphilosophy
