= Athenagoras of Athens =

Greek philosopher and Father of the Church (c.133–c.190)

Saint Athenagoras of Athens
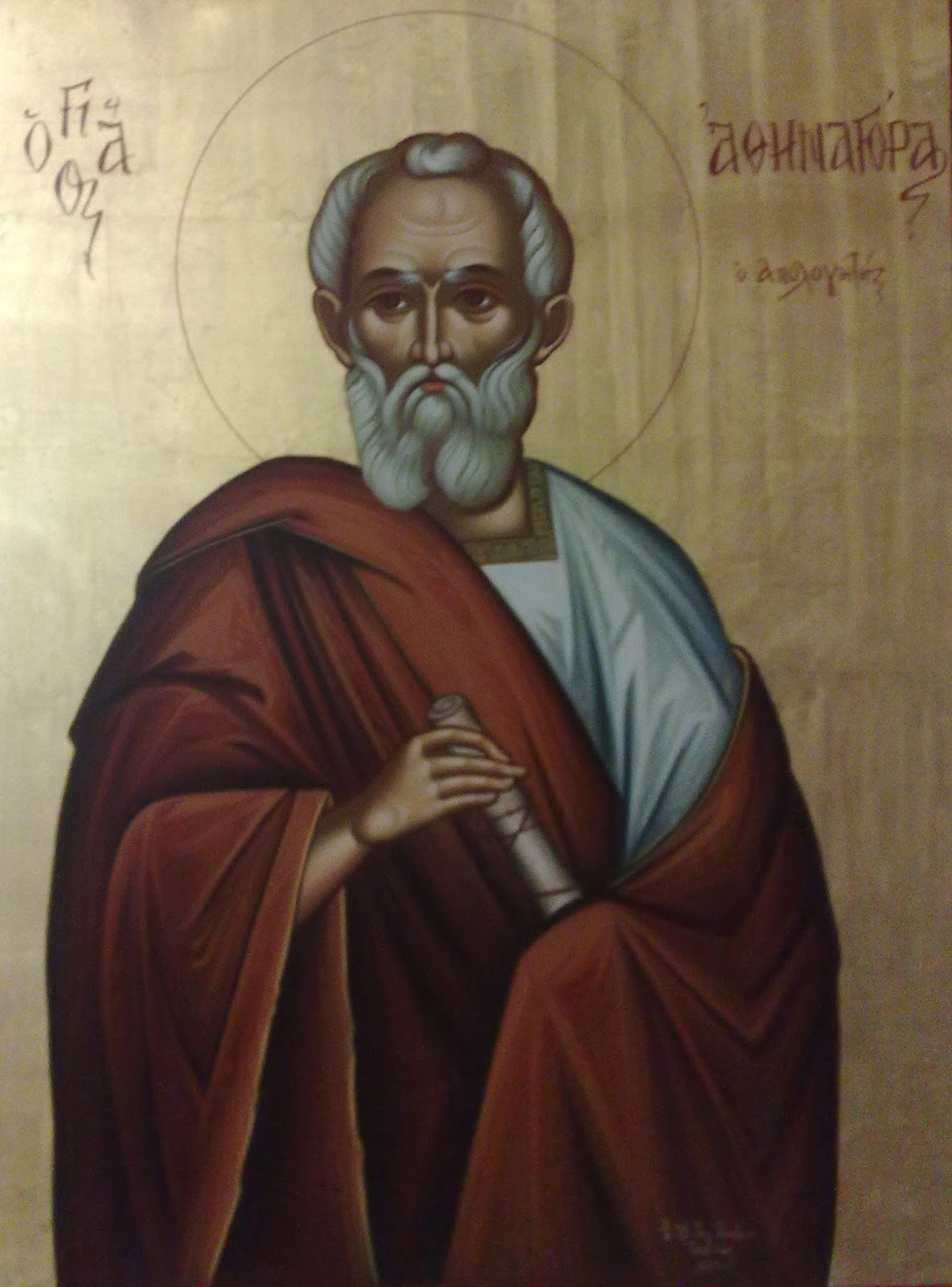
- Greek Icon of Saint Athengoras of Athens
- Born: c. 115 prob. Athens
- Died: c. 190 prob. Athens
- Venerated in: Catholic Church; Eastern Orthodox Church
- Canonized: Pre-Congregation
- Feast: 6 August [O.S. 24 July] (Eastern Orthodox Church)
- Attributes: Athenagoras, the Athenian, Philosopher, and Christian (self-styled)

Athenagoras (/ˌæθəˈnæɡərəs/; Ancient Greek: Ἀθηναγόρας ὁ Ἀθηναῖος; c. 115 – c. 190 AD) was an Ante-Nicene Church Father, a Christian apologist who lived during the second half of the 2nd century of whom little is known for certain, besides that he was Athenian (though possibly not originally from Athens), a philosopher, and a convert to Christianity.

Athenagoras' feast day is observed on 24 July in the Eastern Orthodox Church.

== History ==
In his writings he styles himself as "Athenagoras, the Athenian, Philosopher, and Christian". There is some evidence that he was a Platonist, as Alexander Wilder puts it: “Pantaenus, Athenagoras and Clement were thoroughly instructed in the Platonic philosophy, and comprehended its essential unity with the Oriental systems”. A convert to Christianity, Athenagoras went to Alexandria and taught at what would become its celebrated Christian academy.

== Work and writings ==
Although his work appears to have been well-known and influential, mention of him by other early Christian apologists, notably in the extensive writings of Eusebius, is strangely absent. It may be that his treatises, circulating anonymously, were for a time considered as the work of another apologist, or there may have been other circumstances now lost. There are only two mentions of him in early Christian literature: several accredited quotations from his Apology in a fragment of Methodius of Olympus (died 312) and some untrustworthy biographical details in the fragments of the Christian History of Philip of Side (c. 425). Philip of Side claims that Athenagoras preceded Pantaenus as head of the Catechetical School of Alexandria (which is probably incorrect and contradicted by Eusebius) and notes that Athenagoras converted to Christianity after initially familiarizing himself with the Scriptures in an attempt to controvert them.

From the rhythm of his sentences, and the arrangement of his material, it can be surmised that he attended a school of rhetoric. His writings bear witness to his erudition and culture, his power as a philosopher and rhetorician, his keen appreciation of the intellectual temper of his age, and his tact and delicacy in dealing with the powerful opponents of his religion. Thus his writings are credited by some later scholars as having had a more significant impact on their intended audience than the now better-known writings of his more polemical and religiously-grounded contemporaries. Athenagoras was also an early Christian opponent of the death penalty: "Athenagorus of Athens writes in his apology that: “…we cannot endure even to see a man put to death, though justly…”

Of his writings, only two have been preserved: his Embassy for the Christians (Πρεσβεία περί των Χριστιανών) (more usually called by the Latin titled Legatio Pro Christianis or simply the Legatio and often referred to as the Apology), and a treatise titled the Resurrection of the Dead (Περί αναστάσεως νεκρών) a.k.a. On the Resurrection of the Body.

=== Legatio Pro Christianis ===
The Embassy for the Christians, the date of which is fixed by internal evidence as late in 176 or 177, was a carefully written plea for justice to the Christians made by a philosopher, on philosophical grounds, to the Emperors Marcus Aurelius and his son Commodus, whom he flatters as conquerors, "but above all, philosophers".

The Apology is an early attempt to use Platonic ideas to interpret Christian belief for Greek and Roman cultures. He first complains of the illogical and unjust discrimination against the Christians and of the calumnies they suffer, and then meets the charge of atheism (a major complaint directed at the Christians of the day was that by disbelieving in the Roman gods, they were showing themselves to be atheists). This first strongly-reasoned argument for the unity of God in Christian literature is supplemented by an able exposition of the Trinity.

Assuming then the defensive, he justifies the Christian abstention from worship of the national deities by arguing that it is absurd and indecent, quoting at length the pagan poets and philosophers in support of his contention. Finally, he meets the charges of immorality by exposing the Christian ideal of purity, even in thought, and the inviolable sanctity of the marriage bond. In refuting the charge of cannibalism Athenagoras states that Christians detest all cruelty and murder, refusing to attend contests of gladiators and wild beasts and holding that women who use drugs to bring on abortion commit murder for which they will have to give an account to God.

=== On the Resurrection of the Dead ===
The treatise on the Resurrection of the Dead, the first complete exposition of the doctrine in Christian literature, was written later than the Apology, to which it may be considered as an appendix. The writer brings to the defence of the doctrine the best that contemporary philosophy could adduce. After meeting the objections common to his time, he seeks to prove the possibility of a resurrection in view either of the power of the Creator, or of the nature of our bodies. To exercise such powers is neither unworthy of God nor unjust to other creatures. He argues that the nature and end of man demand a perpetuation of the life of body and soul. Although he clearly teaches the immortality of the soul and of the resurrection body, he argues that the soul is unconscious between death and resurrection: "[T]hose who are dead and those who sleep are subject to similar states, as regards at least the stillness and the absence of all sense of the present or the past, or rather of existence itself and their own life."

== See also ==
- Early centers of Christianity § Greece
