= New Jerusalem =

Ezekiel's prophetic vision of a city

New Jerusalem: Celestial City; City of God; Heavenly Jerusalem; Holy City; Jerusalem above; Shining City on a Hill; Tabernacle of God; Zion
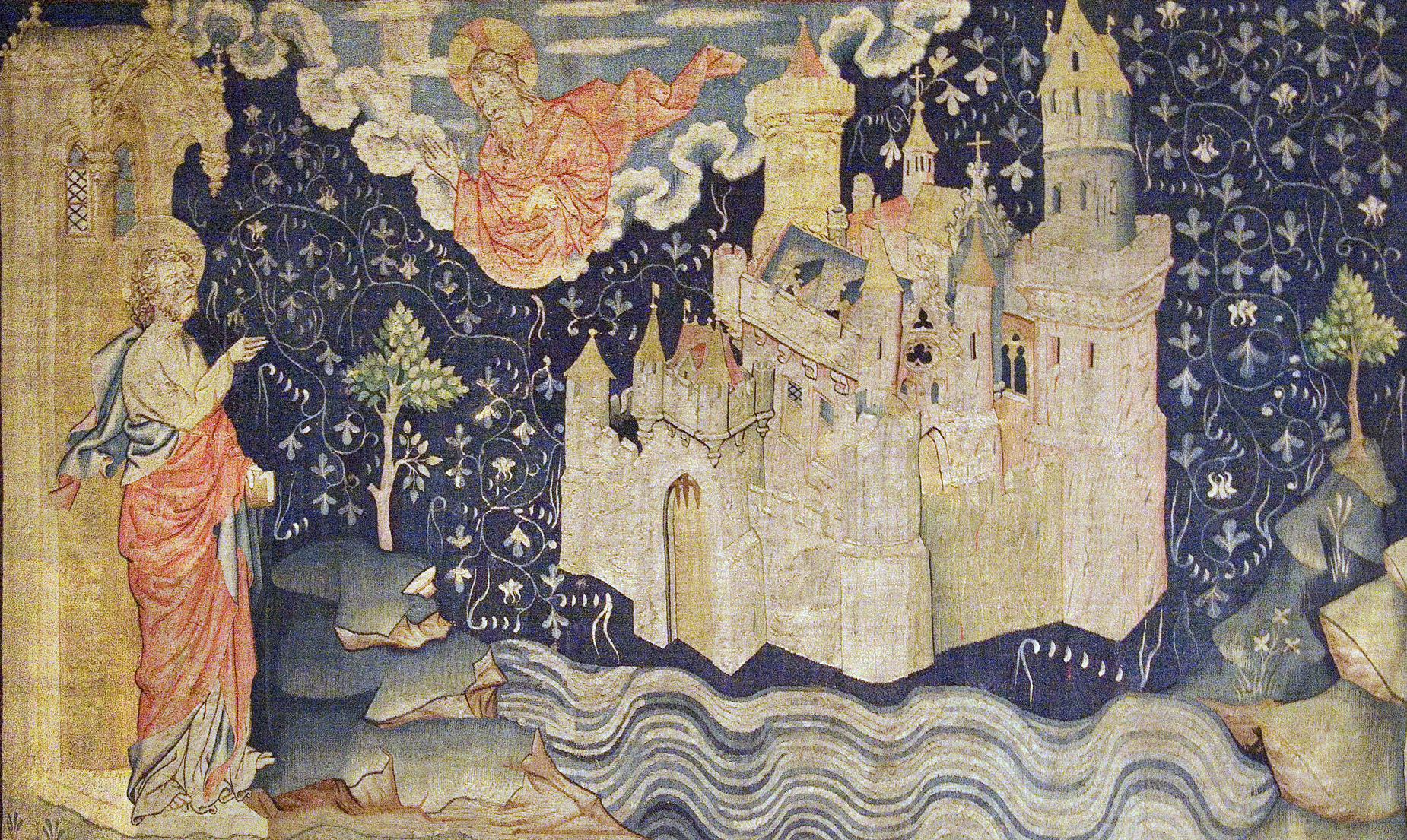
- John of Patmos watches the descent of New Jerusalem from God in a 14th-century tapestry

Area
  - Total: 4,950,625 km^{2} (1,911,447 sq mi)

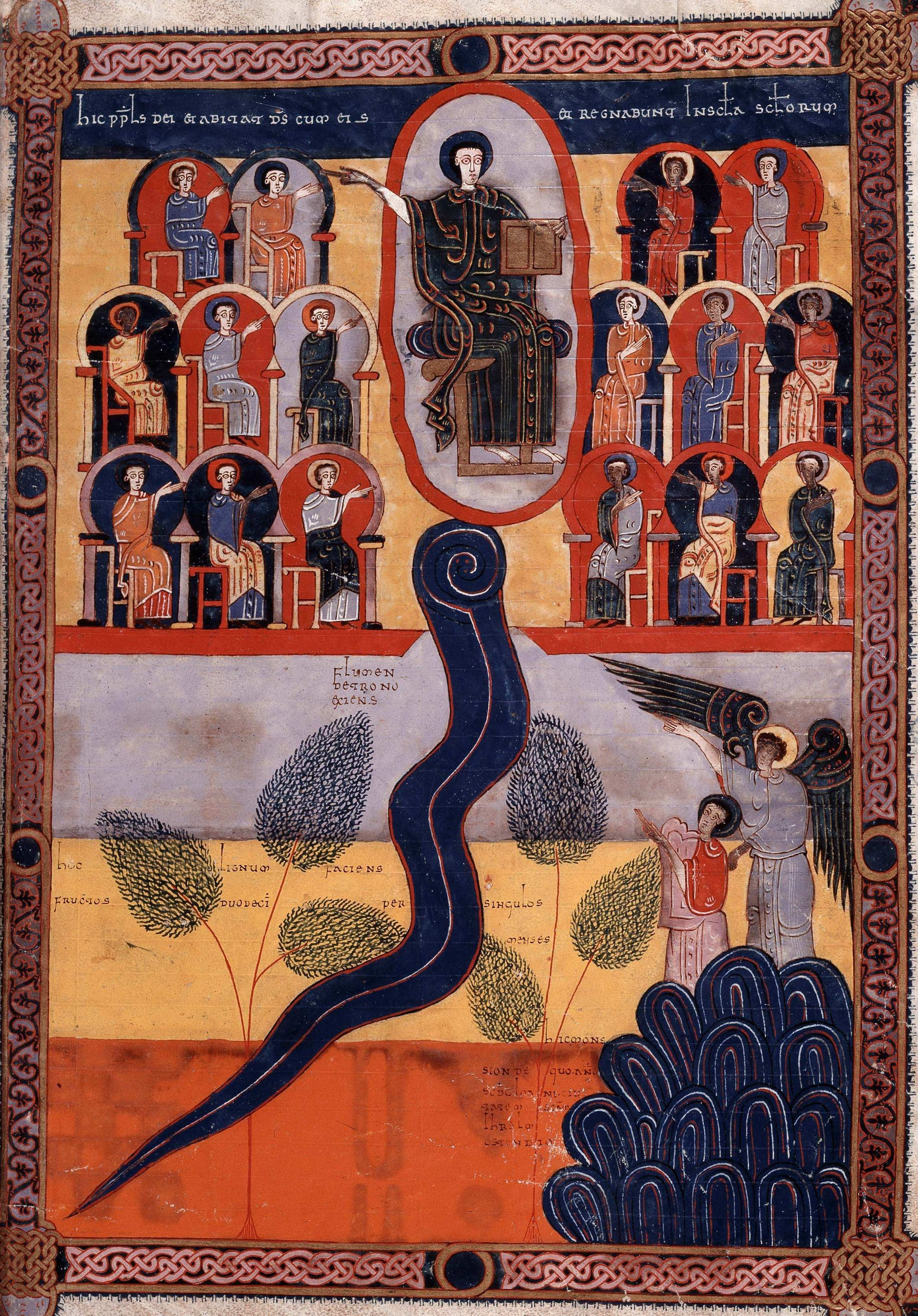
The New Jerusalem and the River of Life (Apocalypse XII), Beatus de Facundus, 1047

In the Book of Ezekiel in the Hebrew Bible, New Jerusalem (יהוה שָׁמָּה, YHWH šāmmā, YHWH [is] there") is Ezekiel's prophetic vision of a city centered on the rebuilt Holy Temple, to be established in Jerusalem, which would be the capital of the Messianic Kingdom, the meeting place of the 12 tribes of Israel, during the Messianic era. The prophecy is recorded by Ezekiel as having been received on Yom Kippur of the year 3372 of the Hebrew calendar.

In the Book of Revelation in the New Testament, the city is also called the Heavenly Jerusalem, as well as being called Zion in other books of the Christian Bible.

== Judaism and origin ==
In Jewish mysticism, there are two Gardens of Eden and two Promised Lands: the heavenly invisible one and the earthly visible one that is a copy of the heavenly invisible one. Heaven in Jewish mysticism includes a heavenly Promised land – including Jerusalem, the temple, and the Ark of the Covenant – and a heavenly Garden of Eden – including the tree of life, a storehouse for the manna that angels eat, and multiple rivers that water the garden. When the Bible mentions a New Jerusalem, heavenly sanctuary, bread of life, or God's throne, it is referring to the Jewish mystical understanding of heaven.

The religious text goes on to describe a Babylonian threat to the Kingdom of Judah began as the Babylonian Empire conquered Assyria and rose to power from 612 to 609 BCE. Jerusalem surrendered without major bloodshed to Babylon in 597 BCE. An Israelite uprising brought the destruction of Jerusalem by Nebuchadnezzar's army in 586 BCE. The entire city, including the First Temple, was burned. Israelite aristocrats were taken captive to Babylon.

The Book of Ezekiel contains the first record of the New Jerusalem. Within Ezekiel 40–48, there is an extended and detailed description of the measurements of the Temple, its chambers, porticos, and walls. Ezekiel 48:30–35 contains a list of twelve Temple gates named for Israel's tribes.

The Book of Zechariah expands upon Ezekiel's New Jerusalem. When the Second Temple was built, after the exile, Jerusalem's population was only a few hundred. There were no defensive city walls until 445 BCE. In the passage, the author writes about a city wall of fire to protect the enormous population. This text demonstrates the beginning of a progression of New Jerusalem thought. In Ezekiel, the focus is primarily on the human act of Temple construction. In Zechariah, the focus shifts to God's intercession in the founding of New Jerusalem.

New Jerusalem is further extrapolated in Isaiah, where New Jerusalem is adorned with precious sapphires, jewels, and rubies. The city is described as a place free from terror and full of righteousness. Here, Isaiah provides an example of Jewish apocalypticism, where a hope for a perfected Jerusalem and freedom from oppression is revealed.

As the original New Jerusalem composition, Ezekiel functioned as a source for later works such as 4 Ezra, 2 Baruch, Qumran documents, and the Book of Revelation. These texts used similar measurement language and expanded on the limited eschatological perspective in Ezekiel.

=== Interpretation ===
Judaism sees the Messiah as a human male descendant of King David who will be anointed as the king of Israel and sit on the throne of David in Jerusalem. He will gather in the lost tribes of Israel, clarify unresolved issues of halakha, and rebuild the Holy Temple in Jerusalem according to the pattern shown to the prophet Ezekiel. During this time Jews believe an era of global peace and prosperity will be initiated, the nations will love Israel and will abandon their gods, turn toward Jerusalem, and come to the Holy Temple to worship the one God of Israel. Zechariah prophesied that any family among the nations who does not appear in the Temple in Jerusalem for the festival of Sukkoth will have no rain that year. Isaiah prophesied that the rebuilt Temple will be a house of prayer for all nations. The city of "YHWH Shamma," (cf. Ezek 48:35) the new Jerusalem, will be the gathering point of the world's nations, and will serve as the capital of the renewed Kingdom of Israel. Ezekiel prophesied that this city will have 12 gates, one gate for each of the tribes of Israel. The book of Isaiah closes with the prophecy, "And it will come to pass, that from one new moon to another, and from one sabbath to another, all flesh will come to worship before Me, says YHWH".

=== Antiochene Persecutions, Hasmonean High Priesthood ===
The Animal Apocalypse within 1 Enoch (chapters 85–90), is another example where conflict sparks hopes for the New Jerusalem. First Enoch is an apocalyptic response to the persecutions under Seleucid Emperor Antiochus IV. In 167 BCE, Emperor Antiochus returned from fighting in Egypt to quell a revolt in Jerusalem led by Jason, the former High Priest. An agitated Antiochus imposed harsh restrictions on Jewish religion. Circumcision, feast celebration, and Sabbath observance were all banned. Antiochus ordered the burning of Torah copies. Jews were required to eat pork. The worst oppression came in the desecration of the Temple. A polytheistic cult was formed, and worship of YHWH abolished. A statue to a Seleucid deity was constructed on the Jewish altar.

First Enoch was written in the wake of this calamity between 166 BCE–163 BCE. For the author of 1 Enoch, history is a steep descent into evil from the utopia in Eden. The author's vision of the eschaton centers on the restoration of Jerusalem: "I saw until the owner of the sheep brought a house, new and larger and loftier than the former" (1 Enoch 90:29). In this New Jerusalem passage, the sheep are the Jewish people, the builder is God, and the house is the Temple. During the same time period, the Dead Sea Scrolls contain a New Jerusalem tradition formed out of strife. As a tiny Jewish sect living in the caves of Qumran, the Essenes opposed Temple leadership and the High Priesthood in Jerusalem. Their condemnation of the Temple focused on criticizing High Priests. They were also frustrated that Judean Kings were also given the role of High Priest. The Essenes were not against the institution of the Temple and its cult per se. The Essenes at Qumran predicted the reunified twelve tribes to rise together against Roman occupation and incompetent Temple leadership and re-establish true Temple worship.

The surviving New Jerusalem texts in Qumran literature focus specifically on the twelve city gates, and on the dimensions of the entire new city. In 4Q554, the gates of Simeon, Joseph, and Reuben are mentioned in this partial fragment. For the author of this fragment, the New Jerusalem's twelve gates signify the reunification of the twelve tribes of Israel. In 5Q15, the author accompanies an angel who measures the blocks, houses, gates, avenues, streets, dining halls, and stairs of the New Jerusalem. There are two important points to consider regarding the Qumran Essenes. First, we do not have enough scroll fragments to completely analyze their New Jerusalem ideologies. Second, based on the evidence available, the Essenes rebelled against Temple leadership, not the Temple itself. Their vision of the New Jerusalem looked for the reunification of the twelve tribes around an eschatological Temple.

=== 4 Ezra, 2 Baruch, 3 Baruch ===
As evidenced above, the historical progression of New Jerusalem language is specifically tied to conflict. The Babylonian Exile, Antiochene persecutions, and corrupt leadership in Jerusalem incited apocalyptic responses with a vision for a New Jerusalem. In the 1st century CE, an even greater conflict exploded in Iudaea province; the Roman destruction of Jerusalem, as well as the other Roman-Jewish Wars. Subsequent apocalyptic responses fundamentally altered the New Jerusalem eschatology for Jews and Early Christians.

At the core, apocalypses are a form of theodicy. They respond to overwhelming suffering with the hope of divine intercession and a perfected World to Come. The destruction of the Second Temple in 70 CE meant an end to Second Temple Judaism. Naturally, apocalyptic responses to the disaster followed. This section will first cover 4 Ezra and 2 Baruch. Fourth Ezra and 2 Baruch are important for two reasons. First, they look for a Temple in Heaven, not the eschaton. Second, these texts exhibit the final new Temple texts in Judaism. Jewish texts like 3 Baruch began to reject a restored Temple completely. However, these texts were deemed to be apocryphal by the Rabbis who maintained the belief in a Third Temple as central to Rabbinic Judaism.

The Jewish apocalypse of 4 Ezra is a text contained in the apocryphal book 2 Esdras. The genre of 4 Ezra is historical fiction, set thirteen years after the Babylonian destruction of Jerusalem. Fourth Ezra is dated approximately in 83 CE, thirteen years after the Roman destruction of Jerusalem. The story follows Ezra's period of mourning following Jerusalem's fall. Ezra is Job-like in his criticism of God's allowance of Jerusalem's downfall.

In Ezra's deep state of grief, he meets a woman lamenting over Jerusalem. Ezra consoles the woman, and tells her to, "shake off your great sadness, and lay aside your many sorrows… the Most High may give you rest." (4 Ezra 10:24). Suddenly, the woman is transfigured in an array of bright lights. She transforms into the New Jerusalem being rebuilt. As a bereaved widow she convinced Ezra to apply solace to himself through the image of a New Jerusalem.

Fourth Ezra has two clear messages. First, do not grieve excessively over Jerusalem. Second, Jerusalem will be restored as a heavenly kingdom. Fourth Ezra also uses the title "Most High," throughout the apocalypse to emphasise that the Lord will once again reign and reside in Jerusalem.

The apocalypse of 2 Baruch is a contemporary narrative of 4 Ezra. The text also follows the same basic structure 4 Ezra: Job-like grief, animosity towards the Lord, and the rectification of Jerusalem that leads to the comfort of the Job-figure. Second Baruch is historical fiction, written after the Roman destruction but set before the fall of Jerusalem to the Babylonians.

Baruch is distressed when the Lord informs him of Jerusalem's impending doom. Baruch responds with several theological questions for God. For this study, Baruch's inquiry about the future of Israel and the honor of the Lord are most pertinent (2 Baruch 3:4-6). Baruch learns that the Lord will destroy the city, not the enemy. Baruch also learns of a pre-immanent heavenly Temple: "[The Temple] was already prepared from the moment I decided to create paradise." And I showed it to Adam before he sinned." (2 Baruch 4:3). This Temple was created before Adam, and shown to him before Adam's fall.

Two important conclusions come from 2 Baruch. First, the author dismisses hopes for an earthly re-built Temple. The focus is entirely on the heavenly Temple that pre-dated the Garden of Eden. This may be a device to express the supremacy of the heavenly Temple as a sanctuary built before Eden (the traditional location of the earthly Temple). Second, Baruch believes that restoration for the people of Israel exists in heaven, not on earth.

The apocalypse of 3 Baruch is the anomaly among post-revolt New Jerusalem texts. Unlike 2 Baruch and 4 Ezra, the text exemplifies an alternative tradition that lacks a restored Temple. Like other apocalypses, 3 Baruch still mourns over the Temple, and re-focuses Jews to the heavens. Yet 3 Baruch finds that the Temple is ultimately unnecessary. This move could be polemical against works which afforded the Temple with excessive veneration. In the passage, an angel comes to Baruch and consoles him over Jerusalem: "Where is their God? And behold as I was weeping and saying such things, I saw an angel of the Lord coming and saying to me: Understand, O man, greatly beloved, and trouble not thyself so greatly concerning the salvation of Jerusalem." (3 Baruch 1:3)

Third Baruch certainly mourns over the Temple. Yet 3 Baruch is not ultimately concerned with the lack of a Temple. This text goes along with Jeremiah and Sibylline Oracles 4 to express a minority tradition within Jewish literature. In the first Christian apocalypse, the Book of Revelation coincides with this perspective on Jerusalem. The study will now move to early Christian perspectives on the Temple and the apocalyptic response in Revelation.

== Christianity ==
The New Jerusalem. Armenian manuscript by Malnazar and Aghap'ir in New Julfa bible, 1645.

Christians have always placed religious significance on Jerusalem as the site of the crucifixion of Jesus and other events central to the Christian faith.

In particular, the destruction of the Second Temple that took place in the year 70, a few decades after Christianity began its split from Judaism, was seminal to the nascent Christian apocalypticism of that time. In the Olivet Discourse of the Gospels, Jesus predicts the destruction of Herod's Temple, and promises that it will precede the return of the Son of Man, commonly called the Second Coming. This prophecy of the renewal of Jerusalem by the messiah echoes those of the Jewish prophets. John of Patmos' vision of the New Jerusalem in the Book of Revelation draws on the Olivet discourse and all the historical precursors mentioned above.

Based on the Book of Revelation, premillennialism holds that, following the end times and the second creation of heaven and earth (see The New Earth), the New Jerusalem will be the earthly location where all true believers will spend eternity with God. The New Jerusalem is not limited to eschatology, however. Many Christians view the New Jerusalem as a current reality, that the New Jerusalem is the consummation of the Body of Christ, the Church and that Christians already take part in membership of both the heavenly Jerusalem and the earthly Church in a kind of dual citizenship. In this way, the New Jerusalem represents to Christians the final and everlasting reconciliation of God and his chosen people, "the end of the Christian pilgrimage." As such, the New Jerusalem is a conception of Heaven, see also Heaven (Christianity).

=== Interpretation ===
Christianity interprets the city as a physical and/or spiritual restoration or divine re-creation of the city of Jerusalem. It is also interpreted by many Christian groups as referring to the Church to be the dwelling place of the saints.

John of Patmos describes the New Jerusalem in the Book of Revelation in the Christian Bible, and so the New Jerusalem holds an important place in Christian eschatology and Christian mysticism, and has also influenced Christian philosophy and Christian theology. Such a renewal of Jerusalem, if a reconstruction, is an important theme in Judaism, Christianity, and the Baháʼí Faith. Renewed Jerusalem bears as its motto the words Ad librum (Latin: "as by the book".)

Many traditions based on biblical scripture and other writings in the Jewish and Christian religions, such as Protestantism, and Orthodox Judaism, expect the literal renewal of Jerusalem to some day take place at the Temple Mount in accordance with various prophecies. The Church of Jesus Christ of Latter-Day Saints too believes in a literal new Jerusalem, though they instead believe that in place of being at the Temple Mount, it will instead be established on the American continent. Dispensationalists believe in a literal New Jerusalem that will come down out of Heaven, which will be an entirely new city of incredible dimensions. Other sects, such as various Protestant denominations, modernist branches of Christianity, and Reform Judaism, view the New Jerusalem as figurative, or believe that such a renewal may have already taken place, or that it will take place at some other location besides the Temple Mount.

It is important to distinguish between "the camp of the saints, and the beloved city" spoken of in Revelation 20:9, and the New Jerusalem of chapter 21. Rev. 20:9 refers to an earthly city, the description and purpose of which is found in book of Ezekiel, starting with chapter 36 and ending with chapter 48. One of the most obvious differences is that the dimensions of the New Jerusalem of Rev. 21 are 1,000 times bigger than the dimensions of the city in Ezekiel 48 (and, in Rev. 20:9). New Jerusalem of Revelation 21 is 2,225 km in length, width, and height. A city of these gigantic proportions cannot be located on Earth; but, as stated in Rev. 21, the city comes "down out of Heaven from God", presumably onto, the "new earth."

=== The Book of Revelation ===
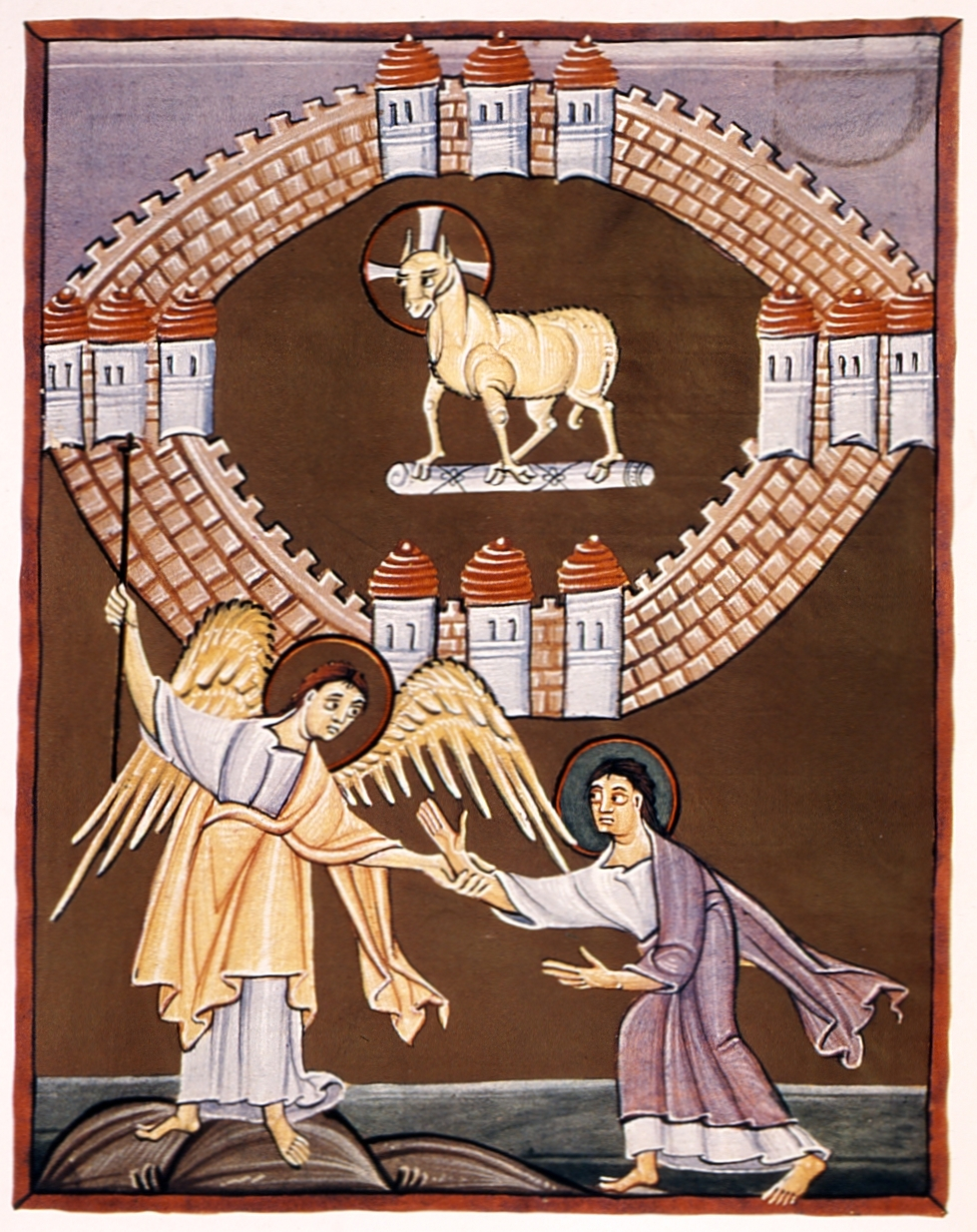
Folio 55r of the Bamberg Apocalypse depicts the angel showing John the New Jerusalem, with the Lamb of God at its center.

==== Introduction to the City ====
The term New Jerusalem (Greek: καινὴ Ἰερουσαλήμ, romanized: kainē Ierousalēm) occurs twice in the New Testament, in Revelation verses 3:12 and 21:2. A large portion of the final two chapters of Revelation deals with John of Patmos' vision of New Jerusalem. He describes New Jerusalem as "'the bride, the wife of the Lamb'", where the river of the Water of Life flows (Revelation 22:1).

After John witnesses the new heaven and a new earth "that no longer has any sea", an angel takes him "in the Spirit" to a vantage point on "a great and high mountain" to see New Jerusalem "descend out of heaven." The enormous city comes out of heaven down to the New Earth. John's elaborate description of New Jerusalem retains many features of the Garden of Eden and the paradise garden, such as rivers, a square shape, a wall, and the Tree of Life.

==== Description of the City ====
According to John, the New Jerusalem is "pure gold, like clear glass" and its "brilliance [is] like a very costly stone, as a stone of crystal-clear jasper." The street of the city is also made of "pure gold, like transparent glass". The base of the city is laid out in a square and surrounded by a wall made of jasper. It says in Revelation 21:16 that the height, length, and width are of equal dimensions – as it was with the Holy of Holies in the Tabernacle and First Temple – and they measure 12,000 furlongs (approximately 1,500 miles). John writes that the wall is 144 cubits, which is assumed to be the thickness since the length is mentioned previously. 144 cubits is about 65 meters, or 72 yards. 12 is the square root of 144; the number 12 was very important to early Jews and Christians, and represented the 12 tribes of Israel and 12 Apostles of Jesus Christ. The number symbolizes completeness in Revelation. The four sides of the New City represent the four cardinal directions (North, South, East, and West.) In this way, New Jerusalem is thought of as an inclusive place, with the 12 gates accepting all of the 12 tribes of Israel from all corners of the earth.

There is no temple building in the New Jerusalem. God and the Lamb are the city's temple, since they are worshipped everywhere. Revelation 22 goes on to describe a river of the water of life that flows down the middle of the great street of the city from the Throne of God. The tree of life grows in the middle of the street and to both sides of the river. The tree bears twelve (kinds of) fruit and yields its fruit every month. According to John, "The leaves of the tree were for healing (those of all) nations." This inclusion of the tree of life in the New Jerusalem harkens back to the Garden of Eden. The fruit the tree bears may be the fruit of life.

John states that the New Jerusalem will be free of sin. The servants of God will have theosis (i.e. the power or likeness of God, that is "in his image" of holiness) and "His name will be on their foreheads." Night will no longer fall, and the inhabitants of the city will "have need (of) no lamp nor light of the sun, for the Lord God gives them light." John ends his account of the New Jerusalem by stressing its eternal nature: "And they shall reign forever and ever."

===== Gates =====
It had a great, high wall with twelve gates and with twelve angels in charge of the gates. On the gates were written the names of the twelve tribes of the sons of Israel. There were three gates on each side: three on the east, three on the south, three on the north, and three on the west (Revelation 21:12–13). The twelve gates were twelve pearls; each gate was made from a single pearl (Revelation 21:21a). The gates in the north wall are named for Reuben, Judah, and Levi; those in the east wall, for Joseph, Benjamin, and Dan; those in the south wall, for Simeon, Issachar, and Zebulun; and those in the west wall are named for Gad, Asher, and Naphtali (Ezekiel 48:31–34).

The New Jerusalem gates may bear some relation to the gates mentioned in Enoch, Chapters 33–35, where the prophet Enoch reports that from each of the four "heavenly gates – opening in heaven – three (new gates) were seen distinctly separating (off, as if) the extremities of the whole earth" [were pulling apart each of the four gates into three new ones]. Thus, the four gates were each replaced by three new ones, totaling twelve [i.e. 3 x 4 = 12] gates in all. [33, 3.][ref. Laurence translation, Book of Enoch.]

===== Geometry =====
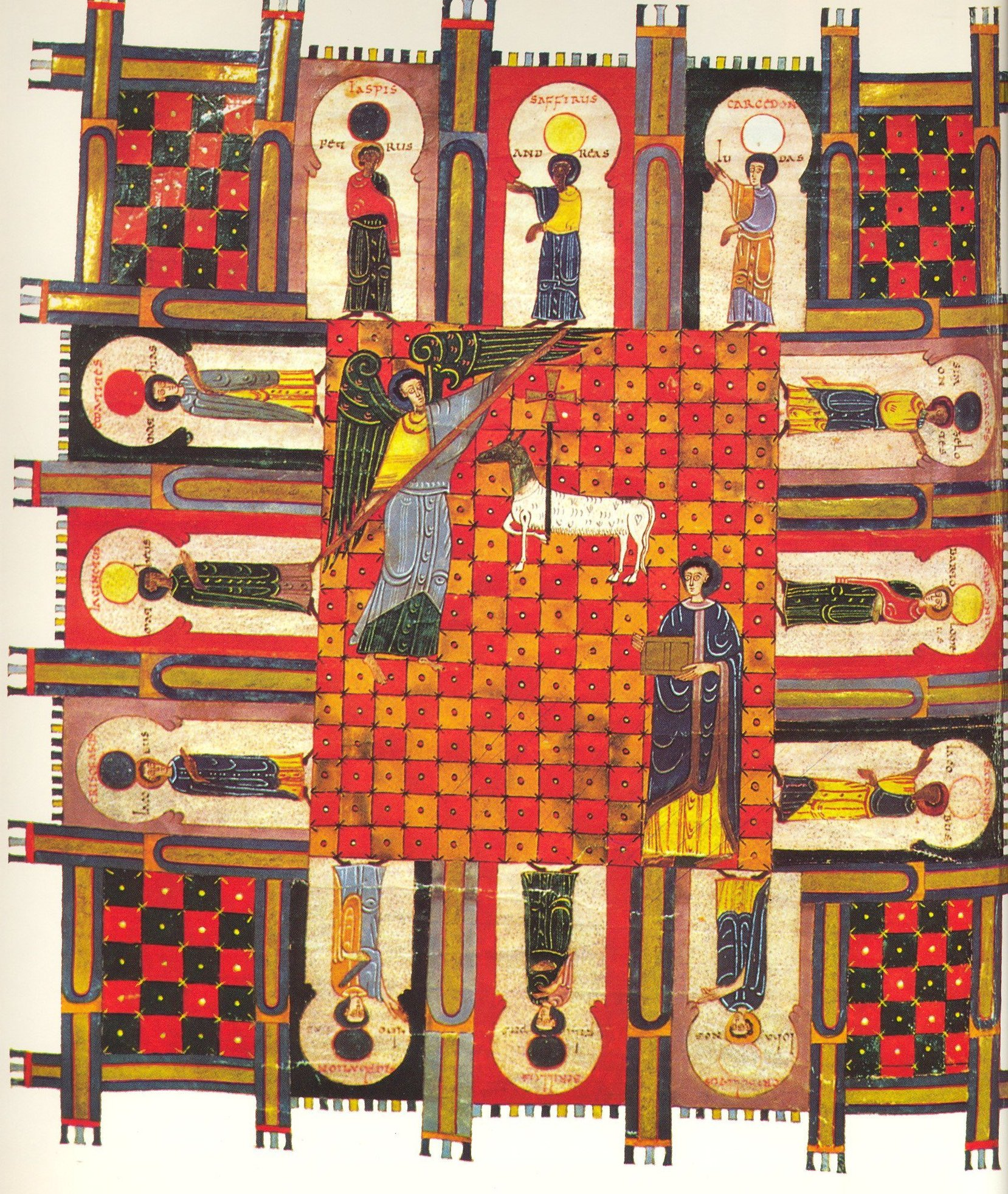
The angel measures the New Jerusalem with the rod or reed. Note the Lamb of God and the twelve sets of figures, gates, and stones.

In 21:16, the angel measures the city with a golden rod or reed, and records it as 12,000 stadia by 12,000 stadia at the base, and 12,000 stadia high. A stadion is usually stated as 185 meters, or 607 feet, so the base has dimensions of about 2220 km by 2220 km, or 1380 miles by 1380 miles. In the ancient Greek system of measurement, the base of the New Jerusalem would have been equal to 144 million square stadia, 4.9 million square kilometers or 1.9 million square miles (roughly midway between the sizes of Australia and India). If rested on the Earth, its ceiling would be inside the upper boundary of the exosphere but outside the lower boundary. By way of comparison, the International Space Station maintains an orbit with an altitude of about 386 km (240 mi) above the earth.

==== Revelation 21:22 ====
The Book of Revelation may have been composed during the end of the 1st century AD near the end of Domitian's reign (A.D. 96), although some date it to the later end of the reign of Emperor Nero Domitius (54 to 68 CE). The work is addressed to the "seven churches that are in Asia" (1:4). Revelation is normally broken into three sections: the prologue (1:1–3:22), the visions (4:1–22:5), and the epilogue (22:6–20). This study is principally concerned with chapter 21.

The author of Revelation was both a Jew by birth and a believing Christian. The author and the addressees of Revelation are searching for the Lord to vindicate them and judge the "inhabitants of the earth" for their suffering (6:10). The fall of Jerusalem, coupled with the Neronian persecutions, form the tension within the subtext of Revelation.

Throughout Revelation, several references to the Temple are made REV 3:12,7:15,11:19,14:15,16:1. This Temple appears to be of heavenly origin. When the eschaton arrives in REV 21:1, the reader expects the temple to come down from heaven with the New Jerusalem. Revelation 21 even contains typical New Jerusalem terminology that accompanies a restored Temple. Specific measurements are given for the new city (Ezekiel 40–48, 4Q554), and the city is built with gold, sapphires, and emeralds (Isaiah, Tobit). In addition, 21:21 references the "twelve gates." Revelation maintains another typical aspect of New Jerusalem tradition – the reunification of the twelve tribes of Israel (Ezekiel 48:33–34, 4Q554).

Verse 22 marks a sudden and remarkable shift in New Jerusalem apocalyptic rhetoric: "I saw no temple in the city, for its temple is the Lord God Almighty and the Lamb." Following with the tradition of 3 Baruch and 4 Sibylline Oracles, Revelation foresees an eschaton without the Temple. Why has the Revelation suddenly denied an eschatological Temple? Verse 23 sheds light on this disparity.

Verse 23 proclaims, "And the city has no need of sun or moon to shine on it, for the glory of God is the light, and its lamp is the lamb." For the author of Revelation, there is no need for a Temple because the Lord will be the New Jerusalem's eternal light and Jesus (the lamb) will be its lamp. This re-interpretation uses Isaiah to make its case: "The LORD will be your everlasting light, and your God will be your glory. Your sun shall no more go down, or your moon withdraw itself; for the LORD will be your everlasting light, and your days of mourning shall be ended." (Isaiah 60:19)

The Temple is discarded in the eschaton because the Lord will provide illumination for the New Jerusalem, and Christ will be the glory for its residents. Henceforth, Christians believed that the New Jerusalem no longer required a Temple. For Christians, their Lord sufficiently replaced the Temple.

=== New Jerusalem – Dead Sea Scrolls ===
Discovered among the Dead Sea Scrolls near Qumran, Israel, were fragments of a scroll which describes New Jerusalem in minute detail. The New Jerusalem Scroll (as it is called) appears to contain apocalyptic vision, although, being fragmented, it is hard to categorize. Written in Aramaic, the text describes a vast city, rectangular in shape, with twelve gates and encircled by a long wall. Similar descriptions appear in Ezekiel 40–48 and Revelation 21–22 and comparison to the Temple Scroll (also found near Qumran) shows many similarities despite no direct literary links between the two.

=== Montanism ===
From the middle of the 2nd century CE to the middle of the 6th century CE, the ancient Christian sect of Montanism, which spread throughout the Roman Empire, expected the New Jerusalem to descend to earth at the neighboring Phrygian towns of Pepuza and Tymion. In late antiquity, both places attracted crowds of pilgrims from all over the Roman Empire. Pepuza was the headquarters of the Montanist church. The Montanist patriarch resided at Pepuza. Women played an emancipated role in Montanism, serving as priests and also bishops. In the 6th century CE, this church became extinct.

Since 2001, Peter Lampe of the University of Heidelberg has directed annual archaeological campaigns in Phrygia, Turkey. During these interdisciplinary campaigns, together with William Tabbernee of Tulsa, Oklahoma, numerous unknown ancient settlements were discovered and archaeologically documented. Two of them are the best candidates so far in the search for the identification of the two holy centers of ancient Montanism, Pepuza and Tymion, the sites of the expected descent of the New Jerusalem. Scholars had searched for these lost sites since the 19th century.

The ancient settlement discovered and identified as Pepuza by William Tabbernee and Peter Lampe was settled continuously from Hellenistic times to Byzantine times. In Byzantine times, an important rock-cut monastery belonged to the town. The town is in the Phrygian Karahallı area, near the village of Karayakuplu (Uşak Province, Aegean Region, Turkey). The ancient site of Tymion identified by Peter Lampe is located not far away at the Turkish village of Şükranje. For the Montanists, the high plane between Pepuza and Tymion was an ideal landing place for the heavenly New Jerusalem.

=== Catholicism ===
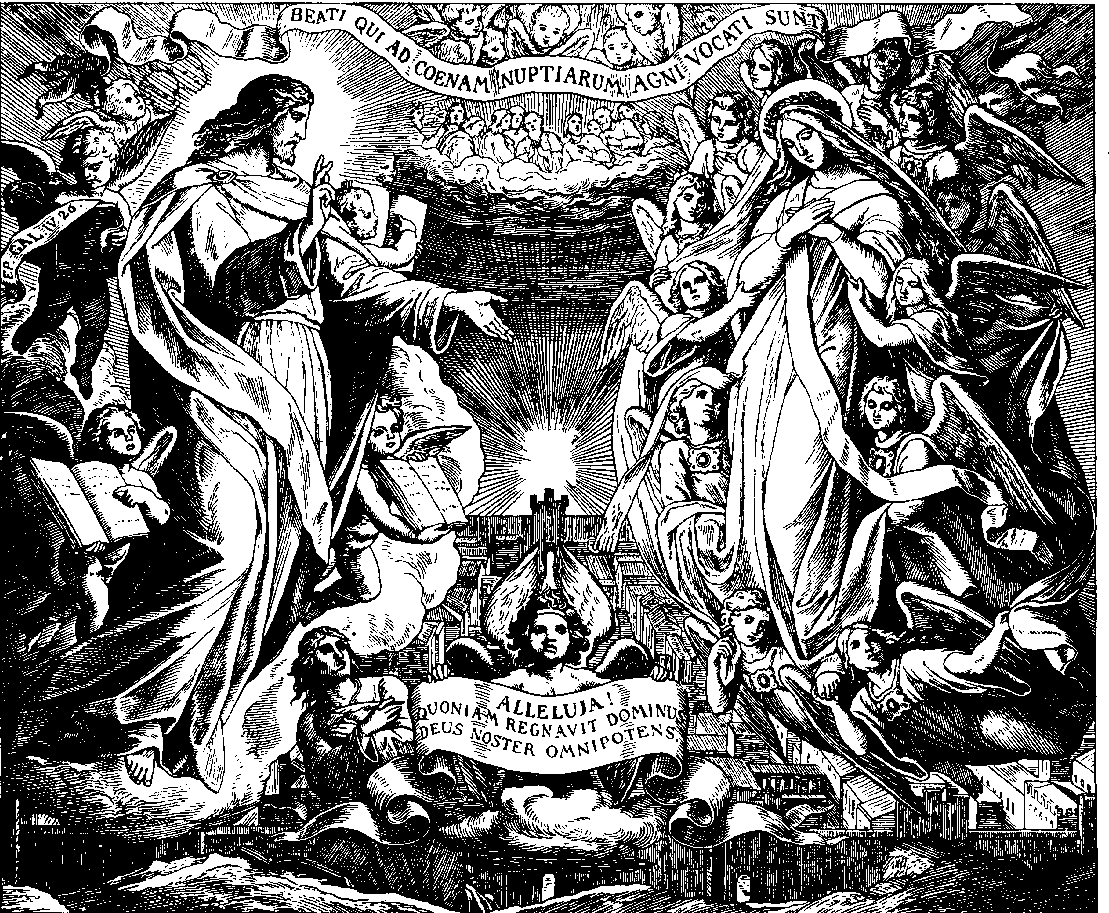
The New Jerusalem, Julius Schnorr von Carolsfeld, 1860

The Catholic Church places the New Jerusalem in the eschatological role found in Revelation. Catholicism also holds that the New Jerusalem already exists as a spiritual community in Heaven, the Church triumphant, with an outpost on earth, the Church militant. Together, the Church triumphant, Church militant, and Church suffering form the Church universal. Augustine of Hippo, a Doctor of the Church and Church Father, draws inspiration from John's account of the New Jerusalem to outline this view in his monumental work The City of God.

The Catholic Encyclopedia article on "Heaven" states that Catholic

theologians deem more appropriate that there should be a special and glorious abode, in which the blessed have their peculiar home and where they usually abide, even though they be free to go about in this world. For the surroundings in the midst of which the blessed have their dwelling must be in accordance with their happy state; and the internal union of charity which joins them in affection must find its outward expression in community of habitation. At the end of the world, the earth together with the celestial bodies will be gloriously transformed into a part of the dwelling-place of the blessed (Revelation 21). Hence there seems to be no sufficient reason for attributing a metaphorical sense to those numerous utterances of the Bible which suggest a definite dwelling-place of the blessed. Theologians, therefore, generally hold that the heaven of the blessed is a special place with definite limits. Naturally, this place is held to exist, not within the earth, but, in accordance with the expressions of Scripture, without and beyond its limits. All further details regarding its locality are quite uncertain. The Church has decided nothing on this subject.

=== Eastern Christianity ===
Emperor Lalibela of Ethiopia built the city of Lalibela as a new reconstructed Jerusalem in response to the Muslim capture of Jerusalem by Saladin's forces in 1187.

The Eastern Orthodox Church teaches that the New Jerusalem is the City of God that will come down from heaven in the manner described in the Book of the Apocalypse (Revelation). The Church is an icon of the heavenly Jerusalem. The New Jerusalem Monastery in Russia takes its name from the heavenly Jerusalem.

=== Puritans ===
The New Jerusalem was an important theme in the Puritan colonization of New England in the 17th century. The Puritans were inspired by the passages in Revelation about the New Jerusalem, which they interpreted as being a symbol for the New World. The Puritans saw themselves as the builders of the New Jerusalem on earth. This idea was foundational to American nationalism.

=== Swedenborgian ===
Ecclesiastic Swedenborgians often refer to their organizations as part of or contributing to the New Jerusalem as explained by Emanuel Swedenborg in such books as New Jerusalem and Its Heavenly Doctrine, Apocalypse Revealed, and Apocalypse Explained. According to Swedenborg, the New Jerusalem described in the Bible is a symbol for a new dispensation that was to replace/restore Christianity. Also according to these books, this New Jerusalem began to be established around 1757. This stems from their belief that Jerusalem itself is a symbol of the Church, and so the New Jerusalem in the Bible is a prophetic description of a New Church.

=== Latter Day Saints ===
In the Latter Day Saint movement, the New Jerusalem is viewed as a physical kingdom that will be built in North America, centered on Independence, Missouri. The movement refers to the New Jerusalem as Zion. The movement's founder, Joseph Smith, attempted to establish this Zion in the early 1830s, and drafted a detailed plat of Zion based on his view of the biblical description of the New Jerusalem, including plans for a temple. However, due to political and military rivalry with other Missouri settlers, members of the religion were expelled from Missouri in 1838. Subsequently, several Latter Day Saint denominations have established residence there, believing that it will be the center of God's Millennial kingdom.

=== Jehovah's Witnesses ===
Jehovah's Witnesses believe that New Jerusalem is made up of anointed Christians serving in heaven as Kings and Priests over the earth. The number of these King-Priests will eventually total 144,000. This belief is based on New Jerusalem being described as "a bride adorned for her husband" REV 21:2, and this same "bride" then being described as "the Lamb's wife" REV 21:9–10. REV 14:1 is seen as depicting a wife-like relationship between the Lamb and the 144,000, therefore linking the identity of the 144,000 with the Lamb's wife and in-turn also that of New Jerusalem.

=== Universal Friends ===
The religious community known collectively as the Society of Universal Friends that gathered around the Quaker evangelist known as the Public Universal Friend in the late 18th century was one of religious righteousness and devotion to Christian ideals. In 1790, the preacher founded a community called (New) Jerusalem, planned as a communal society where righteousness would prevail in the wilderness of New York's Finger Lakes region, in what is today the town of Jerusalem, New York. The society faded away after the death of their leader.

=== British Israelism ===
Richard Brothers, the originator of British Israelism, developed a viewpoint that the British are descended from the Lost Tribes of Israel, and that the capital city of Britain should therefore be re-modeled as a New Jerusalem for the coming Age of Enlightenment. Supposedly this idea was already present in 16th Century England, and that it reached its height of influence during and just after the First World War; certain buildings, such as St Paul's Cathedral, supposedly contain elements of the plan in their design.

=== Bedwardism ===
Bedwardism, a Jamaican religious movement active between 1889 and 1921, asserted that August Town (a suburb of Kingston) was the New Jerusalem for the western hemisphere, and that Union Camp, where Alexander Bedward's Free Baptist Church was located, was Zion. This movement fell apart when Bedward was arrested in 1921.

=== Kimbanguism ===
Kimbanguism, a Congolese sectarian church founded in 1921 by Simon Kimbangu, refers to Kimbangu's birthplace in Nkamba, Congo (a village near Mbanza-Ngungu), as New Jerusalem, where he reputedly performed miracles. Like Bedward, Kimbangu was imprisoned for life in the year 1921, however his movement continues with many followers to the present.

The Kimbanguist believe that people of the Nkamba village saw the New Jerusalem descending from heaven (a building) physically in 1935, by which time Father Simon Kimbangu was in prison. The Kimbanguist has constructed this same design of the building, calling it Nkamba New Jerusalem, in reference to Revelation 21; it has a river with supposed healing power.

=== Taiping Heavenly Kingdom ===
In 1853, the Taiping Heavenly Kingdom captured Nanjing (Nanking) during the Taiping Rebellion against the Qing dynasty of China and renamed the city "New Jerusalem".

== Baháʼí Faith ==
The Baháʼí Faith views the New Jerusalem as the renewal of religion that takes place about every thousand years and which secures the prosperity of the human world. Bahá'u'lláh, the founder of the Baháʼí Faith, identified the New Jerusalem with his claimed revelation (the word of God), and more specifically with the Law of God.

`Abdu'l-Bahá, Bahá'u'lláh's son, further explains that the New Jerusalem which descends from heaven is not an actual city which is renewed, but the law of God since it descends from heaven through a new revelation and it is renewed. Shoghi Effendi, head of the religion after the death of `Abdu'l-Bahá, stated that specifically Bahá'u'lláh's book of laws, the Kitáb-i-Aqdas, is the new Jerusalem. Bahá'u'lláh, in the Tablet of Carmel, also states that the new Jerusalem had appeared upon the new Mount Zion, Mount Carmel.

== Music ==
The Latin Christian hymn "Urbs beata Jerusalem", dating from the 7th or 8th century, makes reference to the Heavenly Salem" as a place of peace and love and a symbol for the Christian's longing for Heaven. The 1851 English translation by John Mason Neale is "Blessed city, heavenly Salem".

The Lutheran hymn "Jerusalem, du hochgebaute Stadt", with lyrics written by Johann Matthäus Meyfart in 1626, describes entering the Heavenly Jerusalem. It was set by composers such as Max Reger and Sigfrid Karg-Elert.

In the 1972 song "Supper's Ready" by English progressive rock group Genesis, the closing section, "As Sure as Eggs is Eggs (Aching Men's Feet)", describes the arrival of the New Jerusalem and admission of the righteous.

The 1989 song "Let the River Run" by Carly Simon prominently mentions the New Jerusalem as an allusion to New York City in its first and last verses.

== See also ==
- And did those feet in ancient time
- Birobidzhan
- City upon a Hill
- Degrees of glory § Celestial kingdom
- Jewish eschatology
- Kingdom of God (Christianity)
- Lamb of God
- Last Judgment
- New Galilee (Sixth Epoch)
- New Jerusalem theater
- New world order (Baháʼí)
- Rauðúlfs þáttr
- Sacred geometry
