= Blessed city, heavenly Salem =

Christian hymn by John Mason Neale

Blessed City, heavenly Salem (Christ is made the sure foundation)
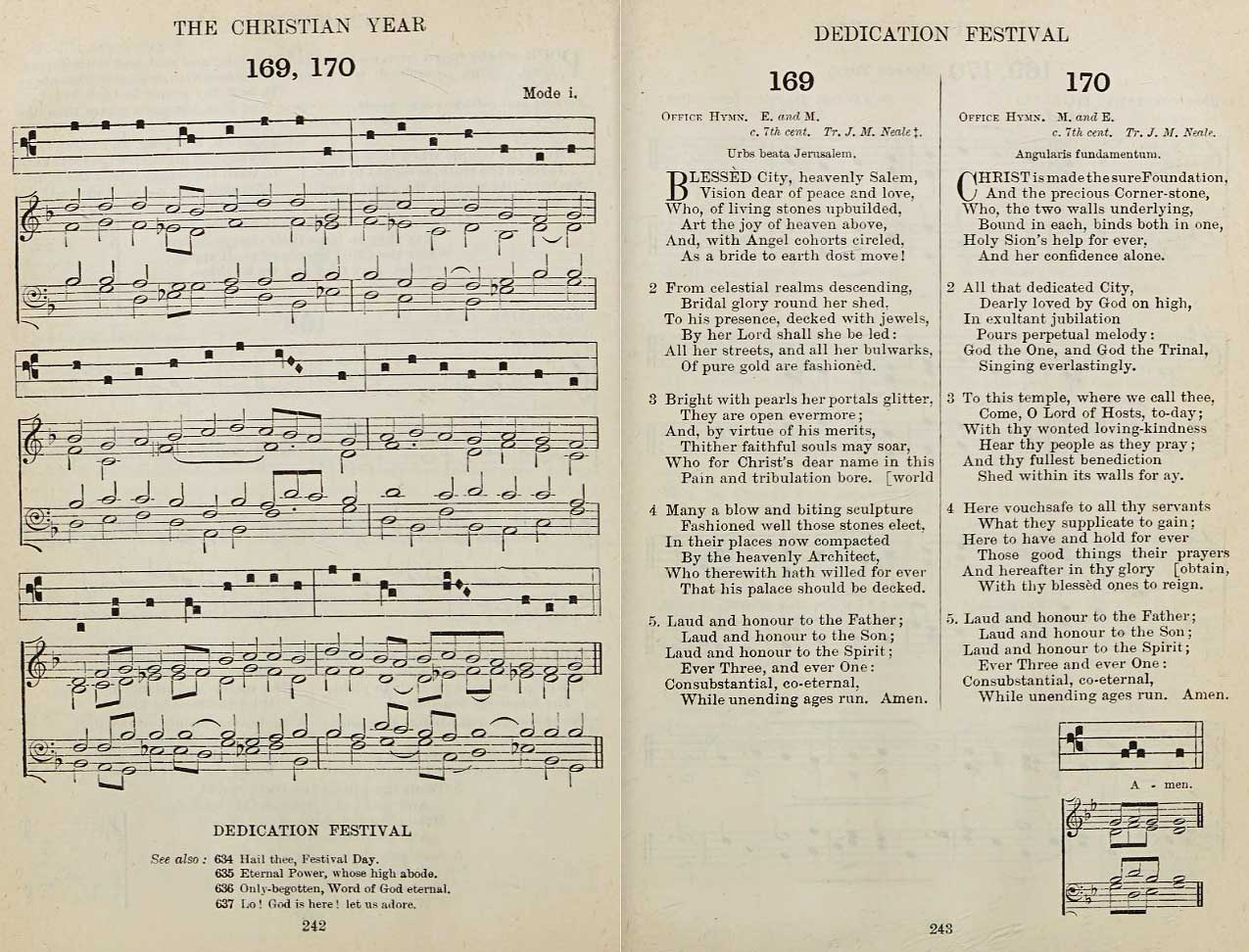
- The two hymns "Blessed city, heavenly Salem" and "Christ is made the sure foundation" (plainsong setting), as published in The English Hymnal (1906)
- Year: 1851
- Genre: Hymn
- Written: John Mason Neale
- Meter: 8.7.8.7.8.7
- Melody: "Westminster Abbey" by Henry Purcell, or "Regent Square" by Henry Smart.

"Blessed city, heavenly Salem" is a Christian hymn. It was translated in 1851 by John Mason Neale from the text of the 6th- or 7th-century Latin monastic hymn Urbs beata Jerusalem. It describes the prophetic vision of the New Jerusalem from the Bible. The first word is normally spoken or sung with disyllabic pronunciation as blessèd. Salem is a poetic name for Jerusalem.

Later stanzas of Neale's translation also gained popularity as a standalone hymn, "Christ is made the sure foundation", and the two hymns are sometimes published separately in hymnals.

== History ==
The text of the hymn has it origins in an 8th-century hymn, Urbs beata Jerusalem. It was translated in 1851 by the English clergyman and scholar, John Mason Neale as "Blessed City, heavenly Salem". In his Mediæval hymns and sequences (1863), Neale notes that the hymn was rewritten as Cœlestis Urbs Jerusalem under the reforms of the Roman Breviary by Pope Urban VIII – a reworking he considered inferior to the original – and again in a later Paris Breviary as Urbs beata, vera pacis. The German hymnologist Hermann Adalbert Daniel thought the last two stanzas of the hymn were a later addition, but the Irish Richard Chenevix Trench clergyman disagreed, arguing that the entire text was of one date of origin.

== Musical settings ==
Tune Westminster Abbey
Both hymns may be sung to this tune by Henry Purcell

While originally an unaccompanied plainsong melody, both "Blessed City, heavenly Salem" and the derivative hymn "Christ is made the sure Foundation" are now commonly sung either to the tune of "Westminster Abbey", adapted from the final section of Henry Purcell's anthem "O God, Thou Art My God'" Z35; or the tune of "Regent Square", composed by Henry Smart.

The early Renaissance Franco-Flemish composer Guillaume Du Fay wrote at least two settings of "Urbs beata Jerusalem" for four voices, dating from the 1490s. There is also a polyphonic setting by the Spanish composer Tomás Luis de Victoria.

Neale's translation of "Blessed city, heavenly Salem" was set as an anthem for choir and organ by Edward Bairstow in 1914.

== Analysis ==
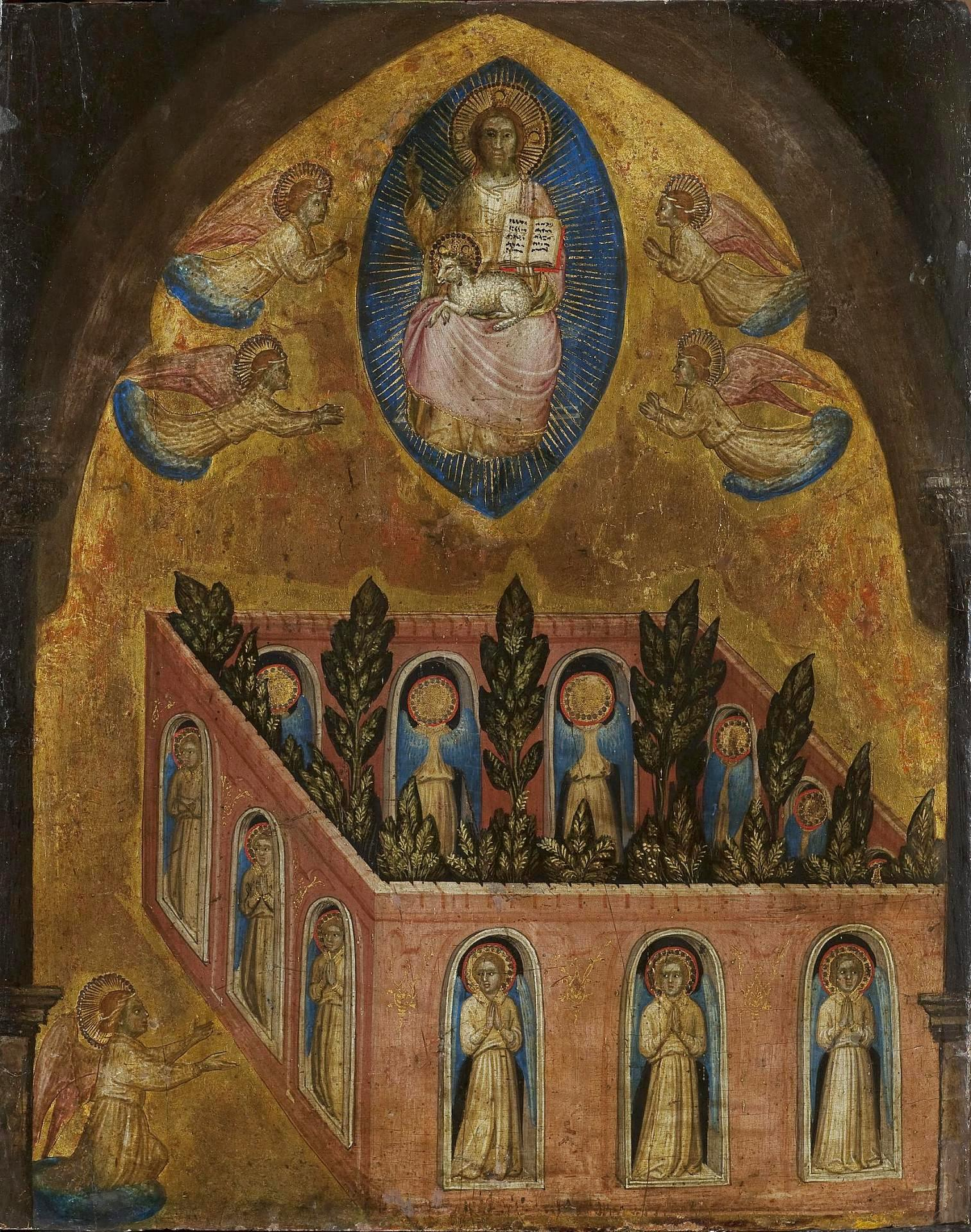
The "blessed city" in the hymn is a reference the Heavenly Jerusalem

The hymn celebrates the relationship of the Christian Church to God through metaphors of a city and a building. The "blessed city" mentioned in the first stanza of the hymn is the New Jerusalem, a reference to the visionary city described in the Book of Revelation in the New Testament (Revelation 11). This "Heavenly Salem is a symbol in Christianity for Heaven, and the hymn goes on to evoke a sense of longing for the poetic Jerusalem as a place of peace and love.

In the fifth stanza, the city metaphor is extended to that of a building, of which Jesus Christ is said to be both the foundation and the cornerstone. Among Biblical sources for the original text are Ephesians 2:20–22, which refers to Jesus Christ as "the chief cornerstone" of a building that grows into a holy temple; and 1 Peter 2:4–7, which describes both Jesus and his followers as "living stones".

The texts of modern versions of the hymns often vary from Neale's original translations. Notably, in the final doxology verse, Neale used the phrase "consubstantial, co-eternal" to describe the concept of the Trinity; more recent publications tend to replace this with "one in might and one in glory" or "one in love and one in splendour", as the words may be considered archaic or too theologically specialised.

== Christ is made the sure Foundation ==
In the Breviary, the Latin hymn was divided after the fourth stanza into two parts, a division which was retained in the Sarum Hymnal (1868). Neale notes that his translation of this second part, "Christ is made the sure Foundation" ("Angulare fundamentum lapis Christus missus est"), had become adopted with "much general favour" as a standalone hymn for the dedication of churches.

Neale's translation of the hymn has been published in various forms in a number of popular hymnals, including The Church Hymnary (4th ed, 2005) and Hymns Ancient and Modern (1874). In The New English Hymnal (1986), the two parts of the hymn are included separately, while in Hymns and Psalms (1983), it appears as one hymn, with verse 1 beginning "Blessèd city..." and verse 2 as "Christ is made...".

"Christ is made the sure foundation" has been sung during a number of significant British royal occasions, including the marriage ceremonies of Princess Margaret and Antony Armstrong-Jones in 1960, and Prince Charles and Lady Diana Spencer in 1981; as the opening hymn of Queen Elizabeth II's Platinum Jubilee service in St Paul's Cathedral in 2022; during the funeral proceedings of Elizabeth II at St George's Chapel, Windsor Castle in 2022; and at the coronation of Charles III and Camilla in 2023, in an arrangement by James O'Donnell. It was also used as the processional hymn of the first visit of a Pope to the Westminster Abbey, the historical visit of Benedict XVI in 2010.
