= Francis Jackson (composer) =

British organist and composer (1917–2022)

Francis Jackson CBE FRCO
- Born: Francis Alan Jackson; 2 October 1917; Malton, North Riding of Yorkshire, England
- Died: 10 January 2022 (aged 104) York, North Yorkshire, England
- Occupations: Organist, choirmaster and composer (Director of Music at York Minster (1946–1982)

Francis Alan Jackson CBE FRCO (2 October 1917 – 10 January 2022) was a British organist and composer who served as Director of Music at York Minster for 36 years, from 1946 to 1982.

== Personal life and family ==
Born in Malton, North Yorkshire, Jackson was the son of William Altham Jackson (1888–1944), an engineer and sanitary inspector, and Eveline May Suddaby (1889–1974), who both sang in the local church choir. He was a first cousin once removed of the lyric soprano Elsie Suddaby who, like him, studied with Sir Edward Bairstow.

Jackson married Priscilla Procter, who died in 2013 at the age of 95. They had three children: Alice, William and Edward.

He turned 100 in October 2017, and the occasion was marked by a special concert during that year's Ryedale Festival. Jackson died at a care home in York, on 10 January 2022, at the age of 104. His last visit to York Minster was in 2021, to see the newly-restored organ following its £2 million refurbishment.

== Career and legacy ==
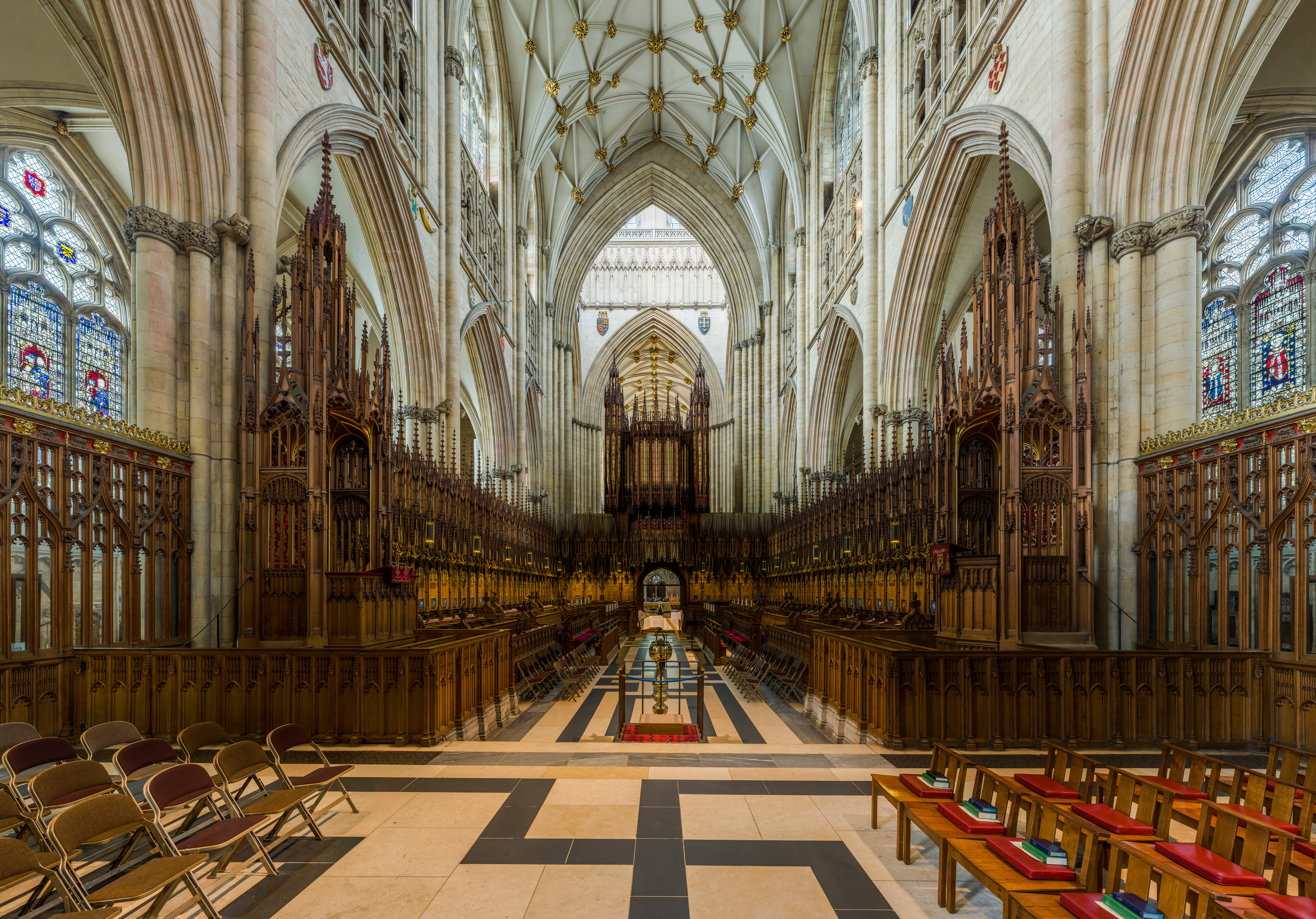
The choir of York Minster, where Jackson served as Organist and Director of Music for 36 years.

Jackson had been a chorister at St Michael's Church, Malton, along with his brother Paul, until he joined the choir of York Minster in 1929, where he sang under Sir Edward Bairstow for four years, after which he returned to Malton to serve as organist at St Michael's from 1933 to 1940. He studied at Durham University and became a Fellow of the Royal College of Organists (FRCO) in 1937, winning the Limpus Prize. After active service during the Second World War he returned to York Minster in 1946 to become Organist and Director of Music, succeeding Bairstow. He held this post for 36 years. After his retirement in 1982, he was appointed Organist Emeritus.

In 1961 Jackson played for the wedding of Elizabeth II's cousin, Prince Edward, Duke of Kent, to Katherine Worsley. The final voluntary was the Toccata from Widor's Symphony for Organ No. 5, which set the fashion for the use of this piece for weddings.

From 1972 to 1974 he served as President of the Royal College of Organists. He was appointed an Officer of the Order of the British Empire (OBE) for services to music in 1978 and a Commander (CBE) in 2007. He was also recognised with many academic degrees and awards throughout his lifetime.

After his retirement, Jackson and his wife retired to the Ryedale village of Acklam, where they had bought a house in 1954, and for many years he gave recitals in the surrounding area. Francis Jackson contributed a tune 'East Acklam' (to distinguish it from West Acklam in Middlesbrough), for the harvest hymn 'For the fruits of his creation' by Fred Pratt Green 1903-2000 (Hymns Ancient & Modern New Standard #457).

Jackson was the mentor of Oscar-winning film composer John Barry.

== Compositions and recordings ==
Jackson gave recitals and concerts all over the world and made numerous recordings of solo organ music and of choral music with the choir of York Minster. His extensive output of sacred and secular music includes canticles, anthems, hymn tunes (including the widely sung "East Acklam"), organ sonatas and other organ pieces such as "Diversion for Mixtures", but his 164 opus numbers range well beyond choral and solo organ music. There are two acclaimed monodramas – Daniel in Babylon and A Time of Fire – as well as the overture Brigantia, an organ concerto (1985), a symphony (1957), chamber music and solo songs.

Jackson's creative output continued after his retirement. He recorded four CDs of his own organ music for Priory Records, and the organ concerto in 1999. Two CDs of his choral works have also been published.

== Writing ==
Jackson was the author of a biography of his teacher, mentor and predecessor, Sir Edward Bairstow, entitled Blessed City: The Life and Works of Sir Edward C. Bairstow. His autobiography, Music For A Long While, was published in 2013.

== Key events ==
- 1929-1933: Chorister at York Minster under Edward Bairstow
- 1933-1940: Organist of Malton Parish Church
- 1937: Gained FRCO with the Limpus Prize
- 1946-1982: Organist of York Minster
- 1957: Gained DMus Durham University
- 1970: Became Fellow of Westminster Choir College, Princeton, New Jersey
- 1972-1974: President of the Royal College of Organists
- 1978: Appointed OBE for services to music.
- 1982: On retiring from York Minster in 1982 he received the Fellowship of the Royal Northern College of Music, the Doctorate of the University of York and, at the hands of the Archbishop of York, Lord Blanch, the Order of Saint William of York.
- 2007: Promoted to CBE in the Queen's birthday honours for services to music.
- 2012: Received the Lambeth degree of DMus (Cantuar) from Archbishop of Canterbury
- 2012: Awarded the inaugural Medal of the Royal College of Organists "for organ playing, organ and choral composition, and choral conducting."
- 2020: Honorary Fellow of the Burgon Society.

Preceded by Sir Edward Bairstow	Organist and Director of Music, York Minster; 1946 – 1982	Succeeded by Philip Moore
