= Urbs beata Jerusalem =

7th or 8th-century Latin Christian hymn about the Heavenly Jerusalem

- Hymn
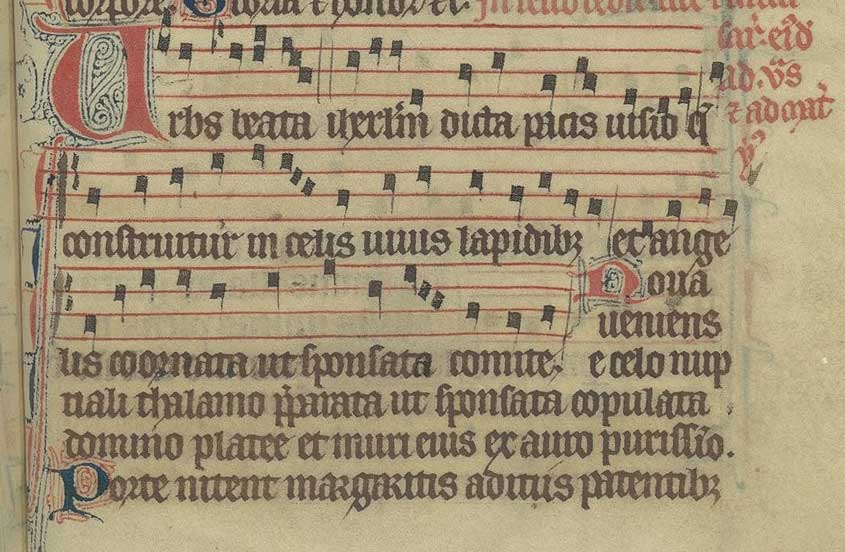
- Urbs beata Jerusalem in the Dominicain Antiphonary (c.1300)
- English: Blessed city of Jerusalem
- Occasion: Church dedication
- Language: Latin
- Meter: 8 8 8 8
- Melody: Gregorian chant
- Composed: 7th or 8th century

Urbs beata Jerusalem ("Blessed city of Jerusalem, called vision of peace") is the first line of a 7th or 8th-century hymn sung in the Office of the Dedication of a Roman Catholic church. The text describes the prophetic vision of the New Jerusalem from the Bible. It appeared in early Roman Breviaries and the text was adapted in the 17th century.

In 1851, the English translation by John Mason Neale gave rise to two popular hymns, "Blessed city, heavenly Salem" and "Christ is made the sure foundation".

== Text ==
The hymn comprises eight stanzas, together with a doxology. The text is scripturally inspired by Ephesians ii. 20, 1 Peter ii. 5, and Revelation xxi.

| Original Latin | Literal English | Verse translation (Neale) |
|---|---|---|
| Urbs beata Jerusalem, dicta pacis visio, Quæ construitur in coelo [caelis] vivis ex lapidibus, Et angelis coronata ut sponsata comite. | Blessed city of Jerusalem, called "vision of peace", Built in heaven out of living stone And crowned by the angels like a bride for her consort | Blessed City, Heavenly Salem, Vision dear of Peace and Love, Who, of living stones upbuilded, Art the joy of Heav’n above, And, with angel cohorts circled, As a bride to earth dost move! |

Urbs beata Hirusalem, dicta pacis visio,
Quæ construitur in cælis vivis ex lapidibus,
Et ab angelis ornata, velut sponsa nobilis :

Nova veniens e cœlo, nuptiali thalamo
Præparata, ut sponsata copuletur Domino;
Plateæ et muri ejus ex auro purissimo.

Portæ nitent margaritis, adytis patentibus;
Et virtute meritorum illuc introducitur
Omnis qui ob Christi nomen hoc in mundo premitur.

Tunsionibus, pressuris expoliti lapides
Suis coaptantur locis; per manus artificis
Disponuntur permansuri sacris ædificiis.

Angulare fundamentum lapis Christus missus est,
Qui compage parietum in utroque nectitur,
Quem Syon sancta suscepit, in quo credens permanet.

Omnis illa Deo sacra et dilecta civitas,
Plena modulis et laude et canoro jubilo,
Trinum Deum unicumque cum favore prædicat.

Hoc in templum, summe Deus, exoratus adveni,
Et clementi bonitate precum vota suscipe,
Largam benedictionem hic infunde jugiter.

Hic promereantur omnes petita acquirere,
Et adepta possidere cum sanctis perenniter,
Paradisum introire, translati in requiem.

The metre is a version of the trochaic septenarius rhythm, often used for hymns in the medieval period (see Trochaic septenarius#In Christian hymns). In the 17th century, under Pope Urban VIII, a group of correctors revised the hymn, replacing the unquantitative, accentual, trochaic rhythm with quantitative, iambic metre, and the stanza appeared in the Breviary with divided lines:

Coelestis Urbs Jerusalem,
Beata pacis visio,
Quæ celsa de viventibus
Saxis ad astra tolleris,
Sponsæque ritu cingeris
Mille Angelorum millibus.

Originally, the first four stanzas of "Urbs beata Jerusalem" were usually assigned, in the Office of the Dedication of a church, to Vespers and Matins, while the last four were given to Lauds. After the revision, the hymn for Lauds was changed to "Alto ex Olympi vertice".

== Analysis ==
In his Mediæval hymns and sequences (1863), the English clergyman and scholar, John Mason Neale noted that the hymn was rewritten as Cœlestis Urbs Jerusalem under the reforms of the Roman Breviary by Pope Urban VIII – a reworking he considered inferior to the original – and again in a later Paris Breviary as Urbs beata, vera pacis. The German hymnologist Hermann Adalbert Daniel thought the last two stanzas of the hymn were a later addition, but the Irish Richard Chenevix Trench clergyman disagreed, arguing that the entire text was of one date of origin.

== Later settings ==
The early Renaissance Franco-Flemish composer Guillaume Du Fay wrote at least two settings of "Urbs beata Jerusalem" for four voices, dating from the 1490s. There is also a polyphonic setting by the Spanish composer Tomás Luis de Victoria.

The hymn was translated in 1851 by John Mason Neale as "Blessed city, heavenly Salem". Neale's translation of the second part of the hymn, "Christ is made the sure foundation", became established as a standalone hymn in its own right, and Neale noted in his Mediæval hymns and sequences (1863) that it had become adopted with "much general favour" as a hymn for the dedication of churches.

Neale's translation of "Blessed city, heavenly Salem" was set as an anthem for choir and organ by Edward Bairstow in 1914.
