= Peter Lampe =

German theologian

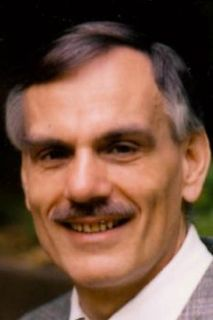
- Born: 28 January 1954 (age 72); Detmold
- Occupations: Theologian & academic
- Title: Professor of New Testament Studies/History of Early Christianity
- Spouse: Margaret Birdsong
- Children: Two
- Parent(s): Dr.med. Karl-Heinrich & Helga Lampe
- Awards: German Ecumenical Preaching Award (2003), Honorary Prof. (South Africa, 2008), Scholars Choice award (USA, 1987)

Academic background
- Education: University of Bern, University of Göttingen

Academic work
- Institutions: University of Heidelberg
- Notable students: Ute Eisen; Stefanie Lorenzen; Heidrun E. Mader
- Main interests: Social history of early Christianity

Peter Lampe (born 28 January 1954) is a German Protestant theologian and chaired Senior Professor of New Testament Studies/History of Early Christianity at the University of Heidelberg in Germany.

== Life ==
After studies in theology, philosophy and archaeology at Bielefeld and Göttingen (Germany) and Rome (Italy) he received his Ph.D. and his Dr. habil. at the University of Bern in Switzerland with works about the social history of the early Christians in the city of Rome in the first two centuries and about the concept of unity and community in the Pauline letters. Scholarships of the German Academic Scholarship Foundation (Studienstiftung) supported his university education and PhD studies. From 1981 on he taught at the University of Bern as assistant professor ("Wissenschaftlicher Assistent") until he was called to a chair of New Testament Studies at Union Theological Seminary in Virginia, USA, in 1986. In 1992, he took the chair of History and Archaeology of Early Christianity and Its Environment at the University of Kiel in Germany, where he also served as dean of the school of theology. In 1999, he accepted a call to a chair at the University of Heidelberg.

In 2005, he co-founded the Research Center for International and Interdisciplinary Theology (FIIT) at the University of Heidelberg, and in 1997 he founded the Societas Theologicum Adiuvantium in Kiel. He has been on the editorial board of international scholarly journals and book series. He is a K.St.J. (Germany), a member of PEN America/PEN International, the international Studiorum Novi Testamenti Societas (SNTS), the Wissenschaftliche Gesellschaft für Theologie (WGTH), and the Society of Biblical Literature (SBL). He is an ordained Lutheran minister and has been married to Margaret Birdsong, having two children, Daniel and Jessica.

== Work ==
His works focus on the social history of early Christianity (groundbreaking studies on, for example, early Christianity in Rome in the 1st/2nd centuries, and on Paul's correspondence with Philemon; his work also contributed decisively to the paradigm shift toward a more contextual reading of the Letter to the Romans); on the Hellenistic background of early Christianity; on Pauline studies (including rhetorical studies); on early Christian archaeology and epigraphy; as well as on methodological and hermeneutical questions. He pioneered applying constructivist categories to New Testament exegesis and hermeneutics. Furthermore, he was one of the first to explore the potential of psychological interpretation in his field.

From 2001 to 2008, he directed annual archaeological campaigns in Phrygia, Turkey. During these interdisciplinary campaigns, together with William Tabbernee of Tulsa, numerous unknown ancient settlements were discovered and archaeologically documented. Two of them are the best candidates in the search for the identification of the two holy centers of ancient Montanism, Pepouza and Tymion. Historians such as W. Weiss, T. Gnoli, S. Destephen, M. Ritter, C.M. Robeck, T.D. Barnes, M. Mazza, and the renown classical historian and epigrapher Stephen Mitchell (2023) affirm that Lampe and his team can “claim credit for identifying the location of the Montanist centres Pepuza and Tymion". Scholars had searched for these lost sites since the 19th century. The Montanist patriarch resided at Pepouza, and the Montanists expected the heavenly Jerusalem to descend to earth at Pepouza and Tymion. In late antiquity, both places attracted crowds of pilgrims from all over the Roman Empire.

== Books ==
- Eschatologie und Friedenshandeln: Exegetische Beiträge zur Frage christlicher Friedensverantwortung (together with U. Luz et al.; Stuttgarter Bibelstudien, vol. 101) Stuttgart: Katholisches Bibelwerk 1981, 2nd edition 1989, ISBN 978-3-460-04011-3.
- Die Anfänge des Christentums: Alte Welt und neue Hoffnung (together with J. Becker et al.) Stuttgart: Kohlhammer 1987, ISBN 978-3-17-001902-7.
- 1987 + 1989: Die stadtrömischen Christen in den ersten beiden Jahrhunderten: Untersuchungen zur Sozialgeschichte, Wissenschaftliche Untersuchungen zum Neuen Testament 2/18 (Mohr-Siebeck: Tübingen 1987; 2nd, revised and enlarged edition 1989) ISBN 3-16-145048-5, ISSN 0340-9570, ISBN 3-16-145422-7, ISSN 0340-9570.
- Christian Beginnings: Word and Community from Jesus to Post-Apostolic Times (together with J. Becker et al.) Louisville: Westminster John Knox Press 1993, ISBN 978-1-56338-264-2. Translation of the 1987 Die Anfänge des Christentums: Alte Welt und neue Hoffnung.
- 1995: Pocahontas: Die Indianer-Prinzessin am Englischen Hof (Diederichs: München 1995) ISBN 3-424-01325-0
- 1998: Die Briefe an die Philipper, Thessalonicher und an Philemon, NTD 8/2 (Vandenhoeck & Ruprecht: Göttingen 1998) (together with N. Walter and E. Reinmuth) ISBN 3-525-51381-X, ISBN 978-3-525-51381-1
- 2003 ff: From Paul to Valentinus: Christians at Rome in the First Two Centuries (Fortress: Minneapolis/Continuum: London, 2003; 6th ed. 2010) ISBN 0-8006-2702-4, ISBN 978-0-8006-2702-7, ISBN 0-8264-8102-7, ISBN 978-0-8264-8102-3, E-book (2006) ED001856
- 2004: Felsen im Fluss: Schriftworte in provokativer Auslegung zu Themen der Zeit (Neukirchener: Neukirchen-Vluyn, 2004) ISBN 3-7975-0071-8
- 2005: Wortglassplitter (a book of poetry; Athena: Oberhausen, 2005) ISBN 3-89896-225-3
- 2006: Die Wirklichkeit als Bild: Das Neue Testament als ein Grunddokument abendländischer Kultur im Lichte konstruktivistischer Epistemologie und Wissenssoziologie (Neukirchener: Neukirchen-Vluyn, 2006) ISBN 3-7887-1624-X.
- 2007: Küsste Jesus Magdalenen mitten auf den Mund?: Provokationen, Einsprüche, Klarstellungen (Neukirchener: Neukirchen-Vluyn, 2007) ISBN 978-3-7975-0142-4
- 2008: Pepouza and Tymion: The Discovery and Archaeological Exploration of a Lost Ancient City and an Imperial Estate (deGruyter: Berlin/New York, 2008; together with W. Tabbernee) ISBN 978-3-11-019455-5 und ISBN 978-3-11-020859-7
- 2008: Neutestamentliche Exegese im Dialog: Hermeneutik – Wirkungsgeschichte – Matthäusevangelium (Neukirchener: Neukirchen-Vluyn 2008) (ed. together with M. Mayordomo, M. Sato) ISBN 978-3-7887-2283-8
- 2010: Neutestamentliche Grenzgänge: Symposium zur kritischen Rezeption der Arbeiten Gerd Theißens (Göttingen: Vandenhoek and Ruprecht 2010) (ed. together with H. Schwier) ISBN 978-3-525-53393-2
- 2010: Paul and Rhetoric (New York/London: Clark 2010) (together with J.P. Sampley) ISBN 978-0-567-02704-7
- 2012: New Testament Theology in a Secular World: A Constructivist Work in Philosophical Epistemology and Christian Apologetics (translated by Robert L. Brawley from the 2006 German edition with substantial subsequent revisions and augmentations by the author; London & New York: T&T Clark/Bloemsbury, 2012) ISBN 978-0-567-32417-7
- 2019: Ad ecclesiae unitatem: Eine exegetisch-theologische und sozialpsychologische Paulusstudie (437 pp; Habilitationsschrift; Bern: Universität Bern, 1989) online: Heidelberg: Universitätsbibliothek Heidelberg, 2019, DOI: 10.11588/diglit.48669; https://digi.ub.uni-heidelberg.de/diglit/lampe1989
- 2023: Los primeros cristianos en Roma: De Pablo a Valentín (603 pp; Salamanca: Ediciones Sígueme, 2023) ISBN 978-84-301-2150-2
- 2024: 'Montanism' in the Roman World: The New Prophecy Movement from Historical, Sociological, and Ecclesiological Perspectives (FS William Tabbernee; NTOA 132; Göttingen: Vandenhoeck and Ruprecht/Brill, 2024) (ed. together with H.E. Mader) ISBN 978-3-525-50104-7
- 2025: Politisch predigen in geopolitischen Verwerfungen: Von Angst zu Zuversicht (Predigtempfehlungen 6; Berlin/Münster: LIT, 2025) ISBN 978-3-643-15754-6, ISBN 978-3-643-35754-0

== Awards and honours ==
In 2003, Lampe received the German Ecumenical Preaching Award (Bonn, Germany). In 2008, he was made honorary professor at the University of the Free State in South Africa. In 1987, in the United States his German book Die stadtrömischen Christen was awarded the distinction of Scholar’s Choice (significant current theological literature from abroad). National merit scholarships of the German Academic Scholarship Foundation (Studienstiftung). To mark his 65th birthday, scholars from five continents co-authored a two-volume festschrift in his honour.

== About Peter Lampe ==
- E.-M. Becker, ed., Neutestamentliche Wissenschaft, UTB 2475, Tübingen – Basel: 2003, 167-175; http://www.ub.uni-heidelberg.de/archiv/25282
- Gerd Theißen im Gespräch mit Peter Lampe, Jahresheft der Theologischen Fakultät der Universität Heidelberg 9 (2013/14), 61-68; http://www.ub.uni-heidelberg.de/archiv/25149
- Portrait of Peter Lampe in the national weekly Die Zeit; http://www.zeit.de/2002/23/Auf_den_Spuren_der_Ekstase
- Ute E. Eisen & Heidrun E. Mader, eds., Talking God in Society: Multidisciplinary (Re)constructions of Ancient (Con)texts. Festschrift for Peter Lampe, vol. I: Theories and Applications (807 pp.) & vol. II: Hermeneuein in Global Contexts: Past and Present (532 pp.), NTOA 120/1+2, Vandenhoeck & Ruprecht/Göttingen: 2020 (vol. I: ISBN Print: 9783525573174, ISBN E-Book: 9783647573175; vol. II: ISBN Print: 9783525573181, ISBN E-Book: 9783647573182); especially vol. I, pp. 9–13 (about Lampe's oeuvre) & vol. II, pp. 495–521 (Lampe's bibliography)
