= Heidrun E. Mader =

German theologian and historian

Heidrun E. Mader (born September 19, 1977) is a German Protestant theologian and historian of early Christianity and its literature, and a professor at the University of Cologne, Germany, holding a chair of Biblical Literature and its Reception History.

== Life ==
Mader grew up in Durban, South Africa (also place of birth), Istanbul, Turkey, Den Haag, the Netherlands, and Oldenburg, Germany. She studied in Oberursel/Germany, Cambridge/UK and Heidelberg/Germany with scholarships of the German Academic Scholarship Foundation (Studienstiftung). From Cambridge University she graduated as M. Phil., being awarded the Scholefield Prize.

As "Wissenschaftliche Mitarbeiterin" (junior faculty) she taught and did research at the Lutheran Seminary Oberursel (2005) and at the University of Heidelberg, Germany, at the chair of Professor Peter Lampe (2006-2019). From Heidelberg University she also received her PhD and her Dr. habil. Since 2020, she has been a Research Fellow of Stellenbosch University in Südafrika. As board member and "Wissenschaftliche Mitarbeiterin" (junior faculty) she worked for the Hessian LOEWE project of excellency "Religious Positioning: Modalities and Constellations in Jewish, Christian and Islamic Contexts" (2020), until she took over an interim professorship at the University of Hamburg (2020/21-2022). Since 2022, she has been a university professor at the University of Cologne, holding a chair of Biblical Literature and its Reception History. She is married and has one child.

Heidrun Mader is co-editor of the international scholarly book series NTOA (Novum Testamentum et Orbis Antiquus), published by Brill/Vandenhoeck & Ruprecht, and the scholarly journal Zeitschrift für Neues Testament (ZNT). She is a member of the international Studiorum Novi Testamenti Societas (SNTS), the Society of Biblical Literature (SBL), the European Society of Women in Theological Research (ESWTR), serving on its German advisory board, and the Collegium Oecumenicum in Heidelberg (longtime chair).

== Work ==
Her work focusses on (1) the oldest Christian literary documents - the letters of Paul of Tarsus and the Gospel of Mark - as well as their relationship: Mader's analysis claims that Mark's Gospel takes up central ideas of Paul's letters and develops them narratively. The result is a narrative elaboration of a coherent set of Pauline topics that Paul had treated in argumentative discourses. Special features that only Mark and Paul have in common come to light. (2) Mader reanalyzes the historical situation of Paul's letter to the Galatians and its addressees, including the concept of "works of the law", which in the Christian tradition often has been charged with anti-Jewish connotations (“righteousness through works" as mistakenly Jewish concept). (3) Visions, prophecies, and oracles in early Christianity. Mader's analysis of the Montanist oracles claims, among other results, that to a large extent these were formulated in the course of the reception of biblical texts. (4) Women theologians and office holders in early Christianity. (5) Circumcision of women in antiquity and its echo in early Christian and early Jewish texts. (6) Dualism and diversity in the Gospel of John. (7) Emotion studies: affects and emotions in (and evoked by) biblical narratives.

== Selected publications ==
- Markus und Paulus: Die beiden ältesten erhaltenen literarischen Werke und theologischen Entwürfe des Urchristentums im Vergleich (BZ Suppl 1), Leiden: Brill 2020 (354 pp.; Habilitationsschrift Heidelberg 2018) ISBN 978-3-506-70479-5, 978-3-657-70479-8. Engl. version:
- Mark and Paul: Comparing the Oldest Extant Literary Works and Theological Ideas of Early Christianity (BZ Suppl.12), Leiden/Paderborn: Brill/Schöningh 2024 ISBN 978-3-506-79390-4, 978-3-657-79390-7. DOI: https://doi.org/10.30965/9783657793907_002.
- Montanistische Orakel und kirchliche Opposition: Der frühe Streit zwischen den phrygischen "neuen Propheten“ und dem Autor der vorepiphanischen Quelle als biblische Wirkungsgeschichte des 2. Jh. n. Chr. (NTOA 97), Göttingen: Vandenhoeck & Ruprecht 2012 (264 pp.; Dissertation Heidelberg 2011). ISBN 978-3-525-53979-8.
- Ute E. Eisen/Heidrun E. Mader (ed.), Talking God in Society: Multidisciplinary (Re)constructions of Ancient (Con)texts. Vol. 1: Theories and Applications (Festschrift for Peter Lampe; NTOA 120/1), Göttingen: Vandenhoeck & Ruprecht 2020 (807 pp.). ISBN 978-3-525-57317-4.
- Ute E. Eisen/Heidrun E. Mader (ed.), Talking God in Society: Multidisciplinary (Re)constructions of Ancient (Con)texts. Vol. 2: Hermeneuein in Global Contexts, Past and Present (Festschrift for Peter Lampe; NTOA 120/2), Göttingen: Vandenhoeck & Ruprecht 2020 (530 pp.). ISBN 978-3-525-57318-1.
- Ute E. Eisen/Heidrun E. Mader/Melanie Peetz (ed.), Grasping Emotions: Approaches to Emotions in Interreligious and Interdisciplinary Discourse, Berlin/Boston: De Gruyter 2024 (326 pp.). ISBN 978-3-111-18103-5, ISBN 978-3-111-18557-6. https://doi.org/10.1515/9783111185576.
- Dualismus und Diversität im Johannesevangelium: Die Erzählungen von der kontrastreichen Begegnung Jesu mit Nikodemos und der Samaritanerin am Brunnen in Joh 3-4, Zeitschrift für die Neutestamentliche Wissenschaft (ZNW) 113, 2022, 26-49.
- Frauenbeschneidung in der Antike und ihr motivisches Vorkommen im Neuen Testament und frühen Judentum, Zeitschrift für Neues Testament (ZNT) 48, 2022, 27-43.
- Narratives Gestalten paulinischer Theologoumena? Paulus und Markus im Vergleich, Zeitschrift für Neues Testament (ZNT) 47, 2021, 41-58.
- Frau in Amt und Autorität im Christentum: Zwischen theologischer Legitimation und ihrer Infragestellung, in Christian Ströbele/Amir Dziri/Anja Middelbeck-Varwick/Armina Omerika (ed.), Theologie – gendergerecht? Perspektiven für Islam und Christentum (Theologisches Forum Christentum – Islam), Regensburg: Pustet 2021, 191-203. ISBN 978-3-7917-3269-5.
- Bigger Than a Little One: Rural Christianity in Asia Minor, 2nd C.E., in Markus Tiwald/Jürgen Zangenberg (ed.), Early Christian Encounters with Town and Countryside: Essays on the Urban and Rural Worlds of Early Christianity (NTOA 126), Göttingen: Vandenhoeck & Ruprecht 2021, 321-334. ISBN 978-3-525-56494-3
- Proselytismus als Mehrheitsphänomen in den galatischen Gemeinden als Kontext für Paulus‘ Kritik an des Gesetzes Werken, in Ute E. Eisen/Heidrun E. Mader (ed.), Talking God in Society: Multidisciplinary (Re)constructions of Ancient (Con)texts (Festschrift for Peter Lampe; NTOA 120/1), Göttingen: Vandenhoeck & Ruprecht 2020, 557-573. ISBN 978-3-525-57317-4
- Frühchristliche Theologinnen im Profil: Maximillas und Quintillas Visionen für die Kirche, in Outi Lehtipuu/Silke Petersen (ed.), Antike christliche Apokryphen: Marginalisierte Texte des frühen Christentums (Die Bibel und die Frauen 3), Stuttgart: Kohlhammer 2020, 240-254 (auch in Englisch, Italienisch und Spanisch). ISBN 978-3-17-034445-7
- „Ich bin kein Wolf“: Phrygische Prophetinnen in der Frühen Kirche, in Michaela Bauks/Katharina Galor/Judith Hartenstein (ed.), Gender and Social Norms in Ancient Israel, Early Judaism and Christianity: Text and Material Culture (Journal of Ancient Judaism: Supplements), Göttingen: Vandenhoeck & Ruprecht 2019, 277-296. ISBN 978-3-525-55267-4
- 'Montanism' in the Roman World: The New Prophecy Movement from Historical, Sociological, and Ecclesiological Perspectives (FS William Tabbernee; NTOA 132; Göttingen: Vandenhoeck and Ruprecht/Brill, 2024) (ed. together with Peter Lampe) ISBN 978-3-525-50104-7
- Circumcised Hagar, the Slave, and Uncircumcised Sarah, the Free Woman, in "Reading Women in the New Testament Letters" (ed. K. Zamfir & U. Poplutz; SBL Press, Atlanta 2025), 331-346. German version:
- Hagar, die beschnittene Sklavin, und Sara, die unbeschnittene Freie, in "Neutestamtliche Briefe" (ed. K. Zamfir & U. Poplutz; Die Bibel und die Frauen 2.2; Stuttgart: Kohlhammer, Stuttgart 2023), 289-301.

== Awards ==
- Hermann Sasse Prize 2022/23.
- Prize of the "Jubiläums-Stiftung" (Anniversary Foundation) of the Ruprecht-Karls-University of Heidelberg (for research and teaching) 2016.
- Scholefield Prize of the University of Cambridge, UK, 2002.
- National merit scholarships of the German Academic Scholarship Foundation (Studienstiftung) (1999-2004).
