= Tymion =

Ancient Roman Town in Asia Minor, now Turkey

Coordinates: 38.487°N 29.4327°E

Tymion (Greek: Τυμίον) was an ancient town in Phrygia, Asia Minor (in today's Uşak Central District, Uşak Province, Aegean Region). Its site is located at the Turkish village of Şükraniye. From the middle of the 2nd century AD to the middle of the 6th century AD, Tymion was an important town for the ancient Christian church of Montanism. The Montanists, whose church spread all over the Roman Empire, expected the New Jerusalem to descend to earth at Tymion and the nearby town of Pepuza; Pepuza was the headquarters of Montanism and the seat of the Montanist patriarch. One of the founders of Montanism, Montanus, called both towns "Jerusalem." In late antiquity, both places attracted crowds of pilgrims from all over the Roman Empire. Women played an emancipated role in Montanism. They could become priests and also bishops. In the 6th century AD, this church became extinct.

Since 2001, Peter Lampe of the University of Heidelberg has directed annual archaeological campaigns in Phrygia, Turkey. During these interdisciplinary campaigns, together with William Tabbernee of Tulsa, numerous unknown ancient settlements were discovered and archaeologically documented. Two of them are the best candidates so far in the search for the identification of the two holy centers of ancient Montanism, Pepuza and Tymion. Scholars had searched for these lost sites since the 19th century.

Historians such as W. Weiss, T. Gnoli, S. Destephen, M. Ritter, C. M. Robeck, T. D. Barnes, M. Mazza, and the classical historian and epigrapher Stephen Mitchell (2023) affirm that Lampe and his team can "claim credit for identifying the location of the Montanist centres Pepuza and Tymion".

The archaeological site at Şükraniye (Karahallı area) that Peter Lampe identified as Tymion was already settled in late Bronze and early Iron Ages. It flourished in Roman and Byzantine times as a rural town in which predominantly tenant farmers lived. They worked on an imperial estate and were often oppressed by travelling magistrates or imperial slaves. In a petition, the farmers asked for help from the emperor. The emperor Septimius Severus wrote back that his procurator would support the farmers. The imperial rescript is preserved on an inscription.

== Literature ==
- William Tabbernee/Peter Lampe, Pepouza and Tymion: The Discovery and Archaeological Exploration of a Lost Ancient City and an Imperial Estate (deGruyter: Berlin/New York, 2008) ISBN 978-3-11-019455-5 und ISBN 978-3-11-020859-7
- Peter Lampe, Die montanistischen Tymion und Pepouza im Lichte der neuen Tymioninschrift, in: Zeitschrift für Antikes Christentum 8 (2004) 498-512
