= Revelation 22 =

- ← chapter 21
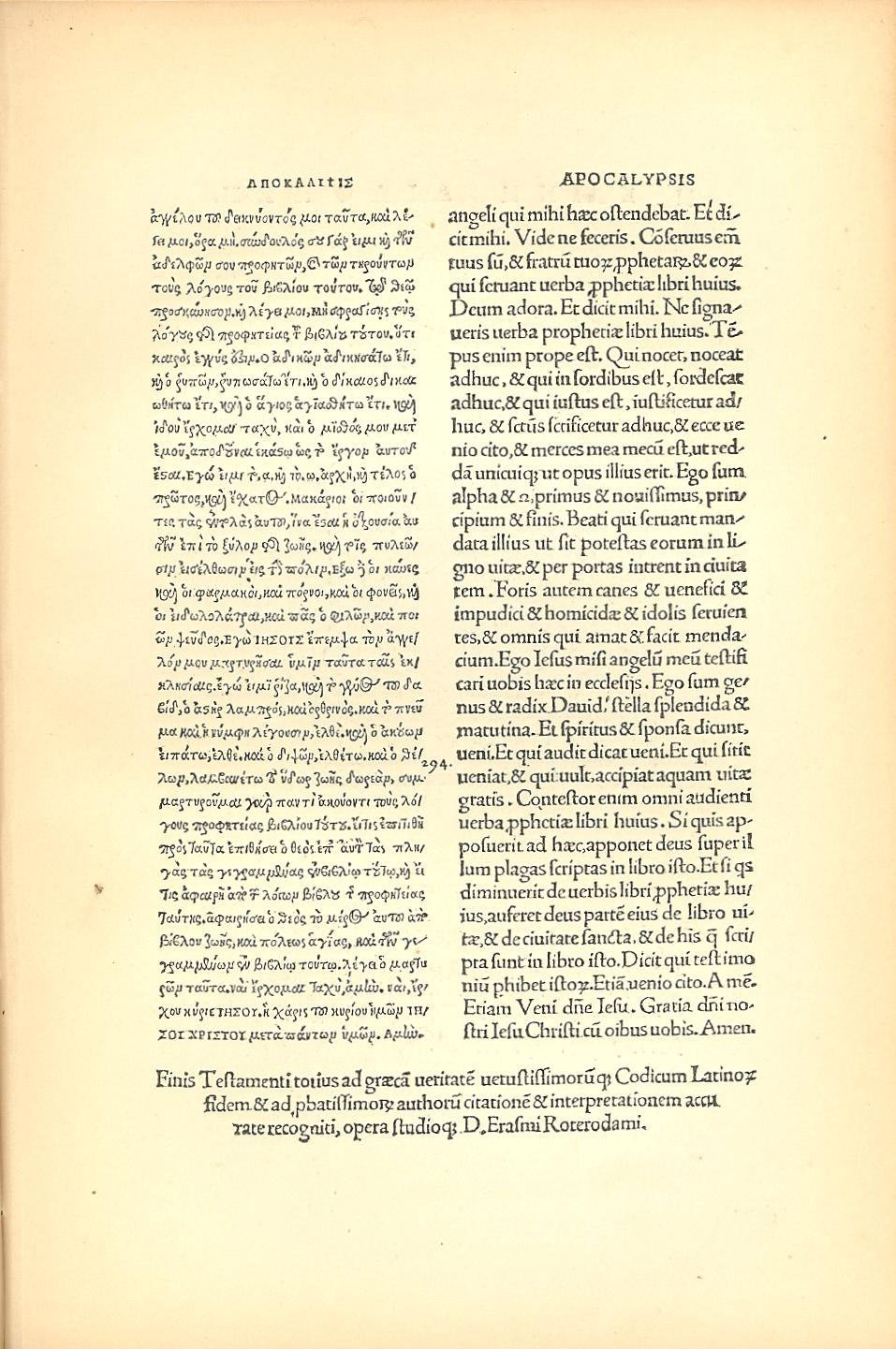
- Erasmus Text of the New Testament, last page (Revelation 22:8-21), 1516.
- Book: Book of Revelation
- Category: Apocalypse
- Christian Bible part: New Testament
- Order in the Christian part: 27

Revelation 22 is the twenty-second and final chapter of the Book of Revelation or the Apocalypse of John, and the final chapter of the New Testament and of the Christian Bible. The book is traditionally attributed to John of Patmos. This chapter contains the accounts of the throne of God in the New Jerusalem, the conversation between the writer and an angel, and, from verse 10 onwards, the epilogue of the book.

== Text ==
The original text was written in Koine Greek. This chapter is divided into 21 verses.

=== Textual witnesses ===
Some early manuscripts containing the text of this chapter include: (Note: The Book of Revelation is missing from Codex Vaticanus, and this chapter is missing from Codex Ephraemi Rescriptus.)

- Codex Sinaiticus (330–360)
- Codex Alexandrinus (400–440).

=== Old Testament references ===
- Revelation 22:13: Isaiah 41:4; Isaiah 44:6
- Revelation 22:17: Isaiah 55:1
- Revelation 22:18: Deuteronomy 4:2; Proverbs 30:6.

=== New Testament references ===
- Revelation 22:9: Revelation 19:10
- Revelation 22:12: Romans 2:6.

== Contents ==
=== Verse 1 ===
Then he (the angel) showed me the river of the water of life, bright as crystal, flowing from the throne of God and of the Lamb.

The angel is the one who was first encountered in Revelation 1:1.

=== Verse 6 ===
And he said to me, "These words are trustworthy and true. And the Lord, the God of the spirits of the prophets, has sent his angel to show his servants what must soon take place."

"These words" are best taken as a reference to the whole Book of Revelation.

=== Verse 13 ===
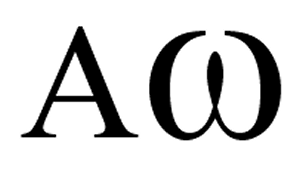
Greek letters alpha and omega

I am the Alpha and the Omega, the Beginning and the End, the First and the Last.

- Cross reference: Revelation 21:6
- "The Beginning and the End, the First and the Last" (KJV; NKJV): NU and M (Note: NU: 'the 27th edition of the Nestle-Aland Greek New Testament' and 'the 4th edition United Bible Societies'; M: 'the Greek New Testament According to the Majority Text'.) read "First and the Last, the Beginning and the End".
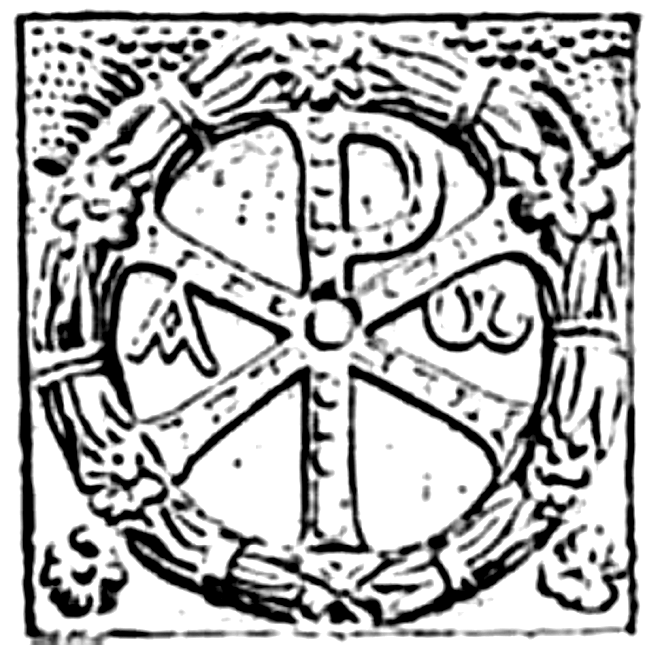
Labarum: Chi-rho with alpha and omega

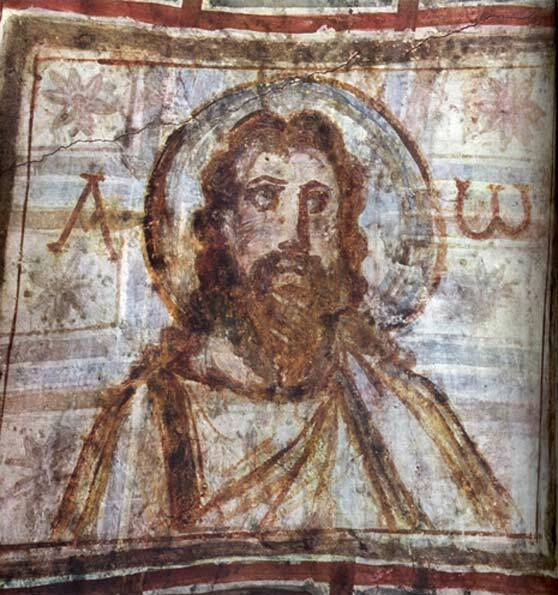
Mural painting from the catacomb of Commodilla. Bust of Christ, (one of the first bearded images of Christ) with alpha and omega. Late 4th century

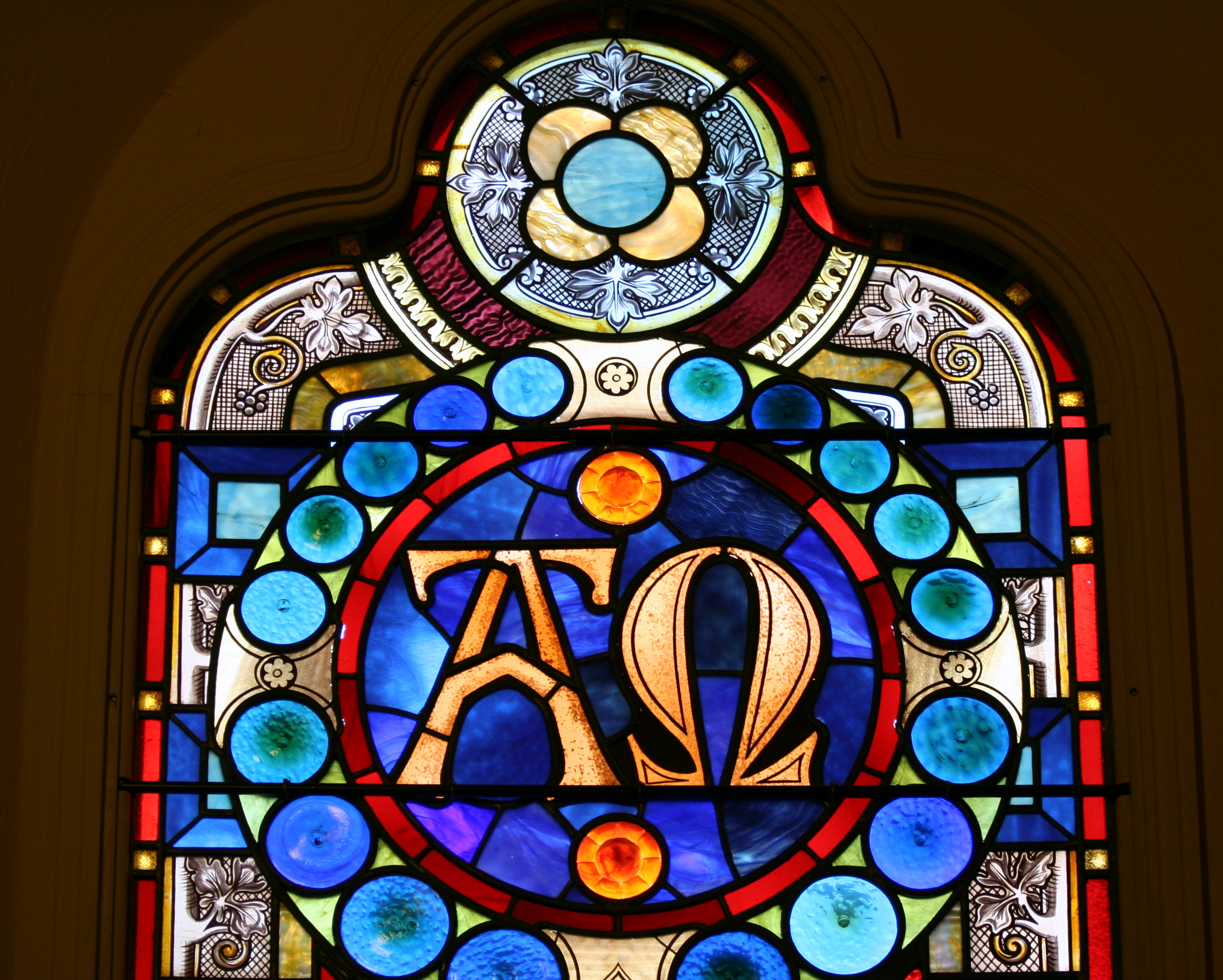
Alpha Α and Omega Ω stained glass window, circa 1883, near the front door of St. Paul's Episcopal Church in Milwaukee, Wisconsin

=== Verse 14 ===
Blessed are those who wash their robes. They will be permitted to enter through the gates of the city and eat the fruit from the tree of life.

=== Verse 15 ===
Outside the city are the dogs - the sorcerers, the sexually immoral, the murderers, the idol worshipers, and all who love to live a lie.

=== Verse 16 ===
"I, Jesus, have sent My angel to testify to you these things in the churches.
I am the Root and the Offspring of David, the Bright and Morning Star." (Note: Some versions refer to "the bright morning star".)

== See also ==
- John's vision of the Son of Man
- New Jerusalem Dead Sea Scroll

== Bibliography ==
- Bauckham, Richard (2007). "81. Revelation". In Barton, John; Muddiman, John (eds.). The Oxford Bible Commentary (first (paperback) ed.). Oxford University Press. pp. 1287–1306. ISBN 978-0199277186.
- Garland, Anthony Charles (2007). A Testimony of Jesus Christ - Volume 2: A Commentary on the Book of Revelation. Vol. 2 (illustrated, revised ed.). SpiritAndTruth.org. ISBN 9780978886424.
