= Edward Bairstow =

English organist and composer (1874–1946)

Sir Edward Cuthbert Bairstow
- Bairstow in 1929
- Born: 22 August 1874; Trinity Street, Huddersfield, England
- Died: 1 May 1946 (aged 71)
- Education: Durham University (external diplomas)
- Occupations: Organist, choir trainer, teacher and composer

Sir Edward Cuthbert Bairstow (22 August 1874 – 1 May 1946) was an English organist and composer in the Anglican church music tradition.

== Life and career ==
Bairstow was born in Trinity Street, Huddersfield in 1874. His grandfather Oates Bairstow was founder of the eponymous clothing firm.

He studied the organ with John Farmer at Balliol College, Oxford, and while articled under Frederick Bridge of Westminster Abbey received tuition from Walter Alcock. He studied organ and theory at the University of Durham, receiving the Bachelor of Music in 1894, and the Doctor of Music in 1901.

After holding posts in London, Wigan and Leeds, he served as organist of York Minster from 1913 to his death, when he was succeeded by his former pupil Francis Jackson. Jackson went on to write a biography of Bairstow. He was knighted in 1932. His other pupils included Elsie Suddaby and Gerald Finzi. During his time in Wigan, he was publicly acclaimed by Hans Richter for his handling of chorus and orchestra. He was president of the ISM, the IAO (Incorporated Association of Organist) and the RCO at various times, he also served on the advisory board of the BBC in its early days. While in Leeds, he had the parish church organ rebuilt, to his wishes, by his friend Arthur Harrison.

He was held in high esteem by his pupils, according to Jackson, who considered his acceptation as chorister under Bairstow in 1929 'the most fortunate day of my musical life.' His praise of the maestro speaks of 'his ability to do supremely well at whatever he put his hand to... I never heard him play a wrong note.'

Notorious for his terseness and bluntness, Bairstow did not always endear himself to others. Asked whether he would be willing to follow the example of his predecessor at York, Thomas Tertius Noble, and emigrate to the United States, he replied that he would "rather go to the devil". Comfortably ensconced in Yorkshire, where he was a close friend of the equally blunt Charles Harry Moody, organist at Ripon Cathedral, he refused an offer to succeed Sydney Nicholson at Westminster Abbey. He instead recommended his erstwhile pupil Ernest Bullock, who was duly appointed to the post.

== Key dates ==
- 1893 Organist of All Saints, Norfolk Square
- 1899 Organist of Wigan Parish Church
- 1906 Organist of Leeds Parish Church
- 1913 Master of Music, York Minster
- 1927 13th centenary celebrations of York Minster (multiple choirs). First time the Bach Mass in B minor was heard in York.
- 1932 Knighted for services to music

== Compositions ==
Bairstow's compositions are mainly for the church. He wrote 29 anthems, ranging from large-scale works for choir and organ such as Blessed city, heavenly Salem to miniatures like I sat down under his shadow and Jesu, the very thought of thee. Among his anthems, Let all mortal flesh keep silence is perhaps the best known. His service music includes published settings in D (Evening 1906, Communion 1913, Morning 1925), E♭ (Full Setting, 1923), and G (Evening, 1940), and several unpublished works. He also composed psalm chants, hymn tunes, and a cantata, The Prodigal Son, for choir and chamber orchestra.

Bairstow was also active as an instrumental composer, mainly for the organ, and some 12 pieces were published in his lifetime, among them the 1937 Sonata in E♭. His small output of chamber music includes a set of variations for two pianos and another set of variations for violin and piano, both long out of print.

== Key works ==
- Evening song, for organ (1900)
- Save us, O Lord (1902)
- Let all mortal flesh keep silence for unaccompanied choir (1906, published 1925)
- Magnificat and Nunc dimittis in D (1906)
- Legend for organ (1907)
- Prelude in C for organ (1907)
- Variations on an Original Theme for two pianos (1908)
- If the Lord had not helped me (1910)
- Prelude, Elegy and Toccata for organ (1911)
- Sing ye to the Lord (1911)
- Blessed city, Heavenly Salem (based on the plainsong "Urbs beata") (1914)
- Lord, Thou hast been our refuge (1916)
- Six Variations on an Original Theme for violin and piano (1916)
- I sat down under his shadow (1925)
- Jesu, the Very Thought of Thee (1925)
- Let all mortal flesh keep silence (1925)
- Jesu grant me this I pray (Orlando Gibbons, arr. Bairstow) (1929)
- The King of love my shepherd is (1931)
- Though I speak with the tongues of men (1934)
- Organ Sonata in E♭ (1937)
- The Prodigal Son for chorus and small orchestra (1939)
- Magnificat and Nunc dimittis in G (1940)
- The Lamentations of Jeremiah (1942)
- Five Poems of the Spirit (1944)
  - 'Come, lovely Name'
  - 'O Lord, in me there lieth naught'
  - 'Praise'
  - 'Purse and Scrip'
  - 'L’Envoy'
- Three Short Preludes for organ (published 1947)

== Books ==
- Handel’s Oratorio ‘The Messiah’: (OUP, Musical Pilgrim series, 1928)
- Counterpoint and Harmony: MacMillan/Stainer & Bell, 1937, 1945 (2nd ed). Republished 2007 by the Bairstow Press, ISBN 1-4067-6086-2, ISBN 978-1-4067-6086-6.
- The Evolution of Musical Form: OUP, 1943.
- Singing Learned from Speech: A Primer for Teachers and Students (with Harry Plunket Greene): (Macmillan, 1945)

Preceded by Thomas Tertius Noble	Organist and Director of Music, York Minster; 1913 – 1946	Succeeded by Francis Jackson
