= Pepuza =

Ancient settlement in Turkey

Coordinates: 38°24′29″N 29°27′41″E

Pepuza (Greek: Πέπουζα Pepouza) was an ancient town in Phrygia, Asia Minor (in today's Karahallı District, Uşak Province, in Turkey's Aegean Region).

From the middle of the 2nd century AD to the middle of the 6th century, Pepuza was the headquarters of the ancient Christian movement known as Montanism, which spread all over the Roman Empire. The Montanist patriarch resided at Pepuza, and the Montanists expected the heavenly Jerusalem to descend to earth at Pepuza and the nearby town of Tymion. In late antiquity, both places attracted crowds of pilgrims from all over the Roman Empire. Women played an emancipated role in Montanism, becoming priests and also bishops. In the 6th century, this movement became extinct.

Since 2001, Peter Lampe of the University of Heidelberg has directed annual archaeological campaigns in Phrygia, Turkey. During these interdisciplinary campaigns, together with William Tabbernee of Tulsa, numerous unknown ancient settlements were discovered and archaeologically documented. Two of them are the best candidates so far in the search for the identification of the two holy centres of ancient Montanism, Pepuza and Tymion. Scholars had searched for these lost sites since the 19th century.

Historians such as W. Weiss, T. Gnoli, S. Destephen, M. Ritter, C. M. Robeck, T. D. Barnes, M. Mazza, and the renown classical historian and epigrapher Stephen Mitchell (2023) affirm that Peter Lampe and his team can "claim credit for identifying the location of the Montanist centres Pepuza and Tymion".

The ancient settlement in the Karahallı area, near the village of Karayakuplu, discovered and identified as Pepuza by William Tabbernee and Peter Lampe, was settled continuously from Hellenistic times to Byzantine times. In Byzantine times, an important rock-cut monastery belonged to the town.

== Bibliography ==
- William Tabbernee, Peter Lampe, Pepouza and Tymion: The Discovery and Archaeological Exploration of a Lost Ancient City and an Imperial Estate (deGruyter: Berlin/New York, 2008) ISBN 978-3-11-019455-5 and ISBN 978-3-11-020859-7
- Peter Lampe, Die montanistischen Tymion und Pepouza im Lichte der neuen Tymioninschrift, in: Zeitschrift für Antikes Christentum 8 (2004) 498-512
