= Mar Saba letter =

Controversial early Christian document

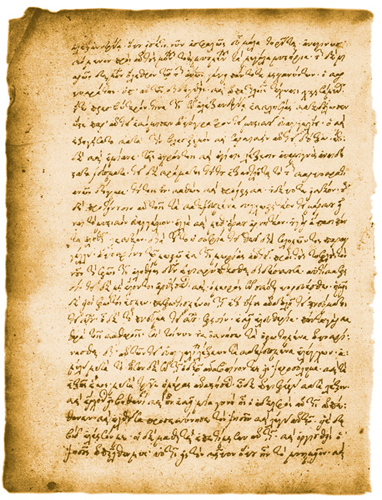
Mar Saba letter

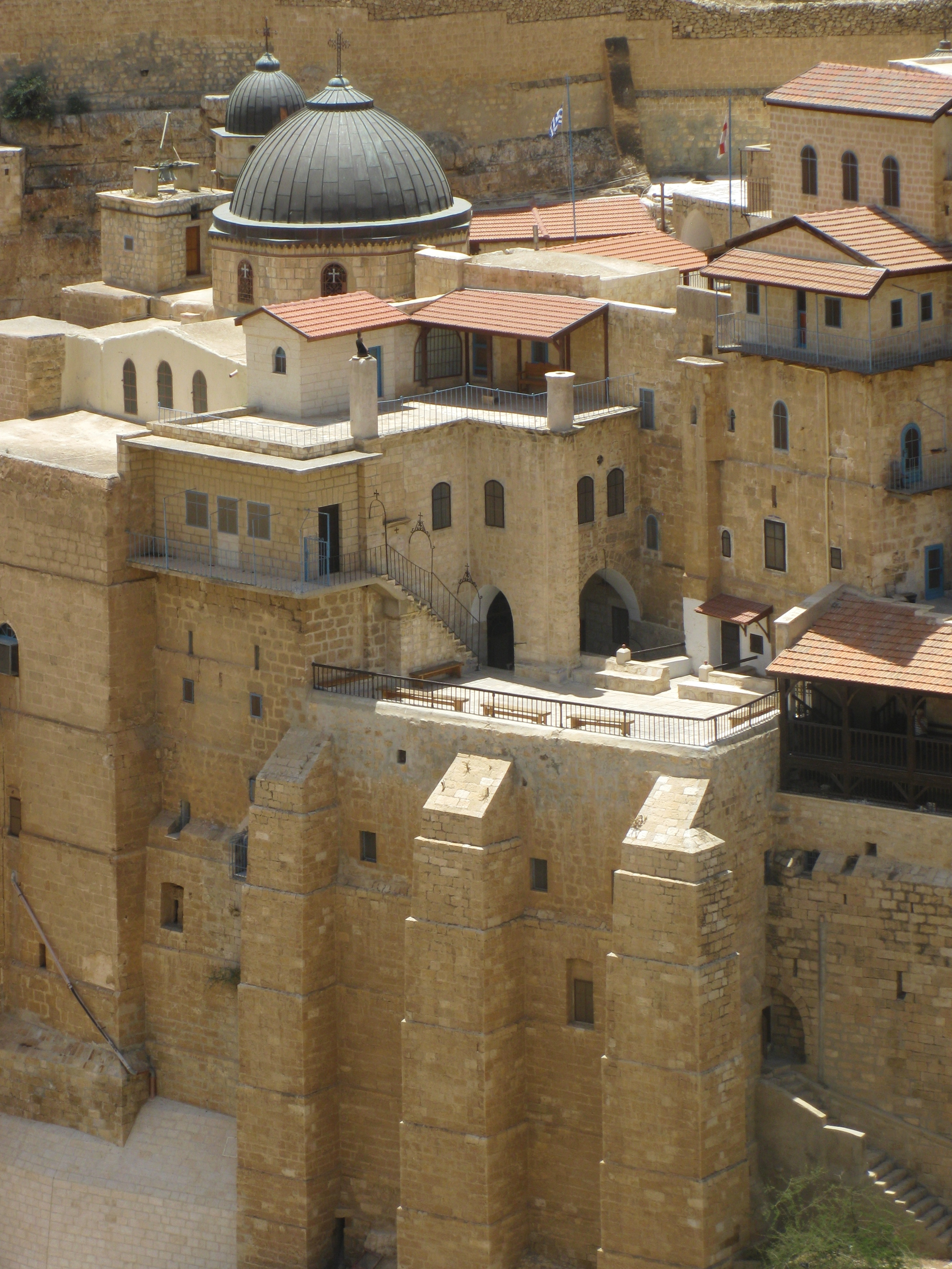
Mar Saba monastery

The Mar Saba letter is a Greek document which scholar Morton Smith reported in 1960 that he had discovered in the library of the Mar Saba monastery in 1958. The document has been lost and now only survives in two sets of photographs. The text purports to be an epistle of Clement of Alexandria and contains the only known references to a "Secret Gospel of Mark".

== Discovery and disappearance ==
In 1960, Morton Smith announced the discovery of a previously unknown letter with authorship attributed to Clement of Alexandria. Smith stated that while cataloging documents at the ancient monastery of Mar Saba in the summer of 1958, he discovered the text of the letter handwritten into the endpapers of Isaac Vossius' 1646 printed edition of the works of Ignatius of Antioch. This letter is consequently referred to as the Mar Saba letter of Clement of Alexandria. In 1973 he published a book on the subject, followed by a second book for a popular audience in 1974.

Smith's books reproduced black-and-white photographs which he stated he had taken at the time of the discovery. In 1976 a group of four scholars visited Mar Saba, and viewed the manuscript. This visit remained unknown until 2003 when one of the party, Guy Stroumsa, published an account of the visit. In 1977, the volume containing the manuscript was taken to the library of the Greek Orthodox Patriarchate in Jerusalem. That same year, the manuscript pages were removed from the bound volume by the librarian Kallistos Dourvas, to be photographed and kept separately. These photographs were published in 2000. Subsequent attempts by scholars to view the manuscript have been unsuccessful. Paleographers, working from Smith's photographs, have assigned dates from the late seventeenth to the early nineteenth centuries.

== Text ==
The letter, addressed to one Theodore, discusses a "Secret Gospel of Mark" and quotes two excerpts from this gospel, one of which mentions "the mystery of the kingdom of God." Clement begins by commending Theodore's actions against the Carpocratians. He then turns to address questions posed by Theodore regarding the Gospel of Mark, a secret variant of which the Carpocratians claim to have. Clement admits to knowledge of a second secret or mystical version of the gospel, written by Mark for "those being perfected". However, he asserts that the version promoted by the Carpocratians is not an accurate representation of this; they have corrupted the original with their own false additions. To illustrate this, two ostensibly genuine excerpts from the gospel are supplied. The letter breaks off abruptly as Clement begins to explain the passages.

== Controversy over authenticity ==
Scholars Philip Jenkins and Robert M. Price noticed parallels between The Secret Gospel of Mark and a novel by James Hunter published in 1940 entitled The Mystery of Mar Saba. In 1980 the Mar Saba letter was included in the revision of the standard edition of works of Clement of Alexandria: Otto Stählin and Ursula Treu, Clemens Alexandrinus, vol. 4.1: Register, 2nd ed. (Berlin:Akademie-Verlag, 1980), XVII–XVIII.

Nevertheless, doubts have been expressed about its authenticity. In a 1975 review of Smith's book, Quentin Quesnell raised doubts about the original manuscript and suggested that it was a forgery executed sometime between 1936 and 1958. Though Quesnell did not specifically accuse Smith, in the view of Charles W. Hedrick he "broadly hinted" that Smith was the culprit.

In 2005 Stephen Carlson published Gospel Hoax: Morton Smith's Invention of Secret Mark, which also asserted that the manuscript was a hoax. By this time independent confirmation of the manuscript's existence and appearance had been presented by Hedrick and others; Carlson argued that Smith had himself written the text into the book.

Earlier in the same year, Scott G. Brown published Mark's Other Gospel: Rethinking Morton Smith's Controversial Discovery. In this book he wrote that the Secret Gospel of Mark was an authentic writing of the evangelist.

Many scholars who accept the letter as a copy of an ancient manuscript believe that it is not the work of the historical Clement. There seems to have been another pseudo-Clement, who was mentioned in the Decretum Gelasianum as "the other Clement of Alexandria." The central element of initiation and progress to "the innermost sanctuary of that truth hidden by seven veils" is common to Gnostic writings and to the mystery religions of the period.

Whether the document is a forgery, and if so who the forger might be, remains unresolved.

== See also ==
- List of Gospels § Reconstructed gospels
