= New Testament Studies =

- Discipline: Theology, New Testament
- Language: English, French, German
- Edited by: Francis Watson

Publication details
- History: 1955–present
- Publisher: Cambridge University Press
- Frequency: Quarterly

Standard abbreviations
- ISO 4: New Testam. Stud.

Indexing
- ISSN: 0028-6885 (print); 1469-8145 (web)
- LCCN: 57048096
- OCLC no.: 01713962

Links
- Journal homepage; Online access; Online archive

New Testament Studies is a peer-reviewed academic journal published by Cambridge University Press under the auspices of the Studiorum Novi Testamenti Societas. The scope of the journal are short studies and articles on issues pertaining to the origins, history, and theology of early Christianity and the New Testament, including studies in its history of interpretation and effects. The editor is Francis Watson (University of Durham).
