= Peter Jeffery =

American musicologist (born 1953)

Peter Jeffery (born October 19, 1953) is an American musicologist.

== Life and career ==
Jeffery graduated from the Fiorello H. LaGuardia High School of Music and Art, and the Performing Arts in New York City, and from Brooklyn College of the City University of New York in 1975, and from Princeton University with an MFA in 1977 and a Ph.D. in Music History in 1980.

He taught at Harvard University, the University of Delaware, and Princeton University, and was in 2014 a professor at the University of Notre Dame.

== Lawsuit ==
On January 25, 1997, Jeffery took his 12-year-old son to a Smashing Pumpkins concert at the New Haven Coliseum in New Haven, Connecticut. He initially planned to wait in a "parents room" but found it was in use by a warm-up act. He joined his son in the concert hall. It was the first rock concert he had attended. Although he wore ear plugs, at the close of the concert his left ear was ringing. He filed a lawsuit against the band, opening acts Fountains of Wayne and The Frogs, Virgin Records, the Coliseum, the city of New Haven, the ear-plug manufacturer, and the vendor he purchased the ear plugs from.

== Awards ==
- 1985 Alfred Einstein Award of the American Musicological Society
- National Endowment for the Humanities, research grant
- 1987 MacArthur Fellows Program

== Selected publications ==
- Re-envisioning Past Musical Cultures: Ethnomusicology in the Study of Gregorian Chant, University of Chicago Press, 1995, ISBN 978-0-226-39580-7
- Ethiopian Christian Chant: an Anthology (1993–97, coauthored with Kay Kaufman Shelemay), the three-volume, A-R Editions, Inc., 1993, ISBN 978-0-89579-285-3
- The Study of Medieval Chant: Paths and Bridges, East and West, Editors Kenneth Levy, Peter Jeffery, Boydell & Brewer Ltd, 2001, ISBN 978-0-85115-800-6
- The Secret Gospel of Mark Unveiled: Imagined Rituals of Sex, Death, and Madness in a Biblical Forgery, Yale University Press, 2007, ISBN 978-0-300-11760-8
- Translating tradition: a chant historian reads Liturgiam authenticam, Liturgical Press, 2005, ISBN 978-0-8146-6211-3
