= Scott G. Brown =

Canadian theologian

Scott Gregory Brown (born 1966) is a private scholar of Christian Origins, who earned his degree from the Department for the Study of Religion at the University of Toronto.

Brown wrote a Ph.D-dissertation about the Secret Gospel of Mark (1999), which he believes is genuine. He rejects the title, "Secret Gospel of Mark," assigned to this gospel by its discoverer, Morton Smith, calling it a bad translation of "mystikon euangelion" ("mystical gospel"), which does not imply strict secrecy and is a description rather than a title. Since Brown considers this title conceptually misleading, he urges scholars to adopt the less loaded title, "the longer Gospel of Mark," a description sometimes used by Smith, or "LGM." He has also written articles in the Journal of Biblical Literature, Catholic Biblical Quarterly, Revue Biblique, and Biblical Archaeology Review.

== Bibliography ==
- "The More Spiritual Gospel: Markan Literary Techniques in the Longer Gospel of Mark" (1999)
- Mark’s Other Gospel: Rethinking Morton Smith’s Controversial Discovery (2005) ISBN 978-0-88920-461-4
- Guide to Writing Academic Essays in Religious Studies (Continuum 2008) ISBN 978-0-8264-9888-5
