= James H. Hunter =

Canadian Christian journalist, novelist and biographer (1890–1982)

James Hogg Hunter (Maybole, Scotland, 30 December 1890-London, Ontario 22 October 1982) was a Scottish-born Canadian Christian journalist, novelist and biographer.

Hunter emigrated to Canada in 1913 at the age of 22 and began his journalistic career with the Peterborough, Ontario Farm and Dairy newspaper in that same year. Four years later he joined the Toronto Globe (later Globe and Mail) where, after breaking in as a cub reporter, he became a member of the editorial staff and wrote a regular bylined column: "The Outlook of the Church." He left the Globe in 1929 to become editor of the Evangelical Christian magazine which he edited until his retirement in 1969.

He was an author of early evangelical Christian thrillers, notably The Mystery of Mar Saba (1940). Hunter was the editor of the Evangelical Christian magazine, published in Toronto. Hunter wrote Christian adventure novels which sold thousands of copies in Canada and the USA. Dr. Hunter's 1951 novel, Thine is the Kingdom, received first prize in an international fiction contest; in 1956 he was named "author of the quarter century" by Zondervan Publishing Company. The Great Deception is a collection of short articles critical of the Roman Catholic Church, which J.H. Hunter published in the magazine he edited and then collected in book form and published in 1945 through The Evangelical Publishers in Toronto. In 1940 J.H. Hunter married Margaret Elizabeth (Diggins). They had three sons.

== Works ==
=== The Mystery of Mar Saba (1940) ===
Plot: The story revolves around finding a long-lost document in the Mar Saba Monastery that is potentially embarrassing to Christianity. The document is later exposed as the work of a hoaxer. The hero is a British policeman in the Palestine mandate and his born-again American assistant. The villain of the story is a close-shaven German archaeologist who leads a band of Arab "Hooded Ones," including the cowardly "Abid of the Scar," who stabs a girl in the back. Some scholars have suggested that Hunter's The Mystery of Mar Saba later became the source for some of the elements in what they consider to be Morton Smith's Secret Gospel of Mark hoax (1958 onwards), while other scholars rebuke that idea altogether.

=== Banners of Blood (1947) ===
Hunter's second mystery story was a popular exposition of the fundamentalist Christian view concerning the question of a Jewish homeland in Palestine.

=== Thine is the Kingdom ===
Thine Is the Kingdom, a cold-war mystery story moving from the gloomy environs of bureaucratic Moscow to the tranquility which pervades the Canadian woodland in summer" won $4000 first prize in the second International Christian Fiction Contest.

=== How sleep the Brave! ===
Hunter's fourth novel How Sleep the Brave! was subtitled "A Novel of 17th Century Scotland". It was self-published by the magazine Hunter edited, Evangelical Publishers, Toronto. After Hunter later published How Sleep the Brave he was named Zondervan's Author of the Quarter Century.

=== Other works ===
- A flame of fire: the life and work of R. V. Bingham, 1961 - on Rowland Victor Bingham (1872–1942), Sudan Interior Mission
- Adrift: the story of twenty days on a raft in the South Atlantic Ethel Roffe Bell, James Hogg Hunter - 1943
- The Hammer of God - 1965
- The Great Deception - 1945
- Evidential Faith: Evolution
- The bow in the cloud 1948
- Uncle Jim's stories from nature's wonderland 1953
- Out of the ivory palaces and other Christmas stories 1954
- "The Happy Vanners" -1912, a journal of a trip to the Trossachs by horse-drawn van exists in an online critical edition. http://www.wingsofsong.com/HappyVanners.html
