= Francis Watson (theologian) =

English theologian

Francis Watson (born 1956) is an English theologian and New Testament scholar. He commenced his career at King's College London before being appointed to the Kirby Laing Chair of New Testament Exegesis at the University of Aberdeen in 1999. In 2007 he took up his current position as Professor in the Department of Theology and Religion at the Durham University.

Watson is well known as a critic of the so-called New Perspective on Paul (NPP). His criticisms of the NPP are all the more significant as he received a positive endorsement of James D. G. Dunn (a NPP proponent) for his doctoral study. After the latter endorsement, Watson explored in particular the social-scientific work of Klaus Berger which contributed to Watson changing his mind dramatically about some results of his unpublished thesis. The result was Paul, Judaism, and the Gentiles: A Sociological Approach, which chronicles Watson's change of mind.

Watson is also a major figure in the study of the Gospels. Watson's 2013 volume, Gospel Writing. A Canonical Approach, is his most voluminous study to date. Extensive critical review articles include those by Markus Bockmuehl and Richard Bauckham. Watson has published What is a Gospel?, a sequel to the 2013 book. It emphasizes the continuity between the canonical and noncanonical Gospels as one long tradition of writing, though he finds a break between the narrative Gospels and what the Apostle Paul meant when he used the term Gospel. Watson has contested the existence of the hypothetical Gospel Q, instead arguing for the Farrer Hypothesis where Luke used Matthew.

Ted Dorman suggests that for Watson, "hermeneutical sovereignty resides not in the text but in the subject matter to which it points" – namely, Jesus Christ.

Watson is the editor of New Testament Studies.

Watson's work has been endorsed by Dale Allison, Simon Gathercole, and Lewis Ayres. Tucker Ferda has described What is a Gospel as a "brilliant and provocative". He appreciates the main argument that the Gospels should be studied the same regardless of canonicity, though he questions whether Watson's model can fully account for the identification of the four canonical Gospels as scripture by later Christians and the claim that Paul's Gospel is distinct from other usages.

== Works ==
=== Thesis ===
- Watson, Francis (1986). Paul, Judaism, and the gentiles: a sociological approach (Ph.D.). Cambridge: Cambridge University.

=== Books ===
- ——— (1986). Paul, Judaism, and the gentiles: a sociological approach. Society for New Testament Studies - Monograph series. Vol. 56. Cambridge & New York: Cambridge University Press. ISBN 9780521325738. OCLC 13332626. - published form of his thesis
- ——— (1994). Text, Church, and World: biblical interpretation in theological perspective. Grand Rapids, MI: Eerdmans. ISBN 9780802837745. OCLC 31389259.
- ——— (1997). Text and Truth: redefining biblical theology. Grand Rapids, MI: Eerdmans. ISBN 9780802838469. OCLC 37176815.
- ——— (2000). Agape, Eros, Gender: towards a Pauline sexual ethic. Cambridge & New York: Cambridge University Press. ISBN 9780521662635. OCLC 260088861.
- ——— (2004). Paul and the Hermeneutics of Faith. London & New York: T & T Clark. ISBN 9780567082428. OCLC 56655231.
- ——— (2007). Paul, Judaism, and the Gentiles: beyond the new perspective. Grand Rapids, MI: Eerdmans. ISBN 9780802840202. OCLC 137305731.
- ——— (2013). Gospel Writing: a canonical perspective. Grand Rapids, MI: Eerdmans. ISBN 9780802840547. OCLC 806521922.

=== As editor ===
- ———; Hockey, Katherine M.; Pierce, Madison N., eds. (2017). Muted Voices of the New Testament: readings in the Catholic Epistles and Hebrews. Library of New Testament studies. Vol. 565. London & New York: T & T Clark. ISBN 9780567667786. OCLC 985966750.

=== Articles and chapters ===
- ——— (2017). "'Every perfect gift': James, Paul and the created order". In ———; Hockey, Katherine M.; Pierce, Madison N. (eds.). Muted Voices of the New Testament: readings in the Catholic Epistles and Hebrews. Library of New Testament studies. Vol. 565. London & New York: T & T Clark. pp. 121–38. ISBN 9780567667786. OCLC 985966750.
