= Naassene Fragment =

3rd-century Christian poem

The Naassene Fragment is a fragmentary text that survives only in a quotation in the third century book Refutation of All Heresies (5.7.2-9) by Hippolytus of Rome. According to Hippolytus, the Naassenes (from Hebrew nachash, snake) were a Gnostic Ophite sect. Hippolytus condemns the group as in error, and offers a fragment of their writings, calling it a hymn or psalm used by them. The fragment is considered part of the New Testament apocryphal tradition.

The fragment is written, like the rest of Hippolytus's work, in Koine Greek. Except for the first line, the work's poetic meter is in anapests, the most common form of verse in the Greek-speaking parts of the Roman Empire.

== Background ==
In the 2nd and 3rd century AD, early Christianity was highly diverse set, as an agreed-upon canon had not yet been created. Many groups had their own favored writings, and even proto-orthodox local Christian groups might have access to only one gospel. Gnosticism was one strain of early Christianity that competed in this period, although "gnosticism" itself is an umbrella term for many separate sects that might have considered themselves as having little in common with other sects called gnostic by later church historians. Later Orthodox writers sharply condemned Gnostics, and Gnosticism eventually faded.

The term "Naassene" is only seen in Hippolytus's writings and is probably not how they self-identified, so it is not known if they were a separate Gnostic group or an alternate term of another Gnostic group, nor if the fragment expresses ideas shared in common by many Gnostics or just the Naassenes.

== Text ==
A translation of the fragment in New Testament Apocrypha, whose English translation was edited by R. McL. Wilson, with the aid of Walter Bauer's Greek to German translation:

Primal principle of all things was the first-born Mind;
The second, poured forth from the first-born, was Chaos;
The third, which received <being and form from both>, is the soul.
And it is like the timid deer
Which is hunted upon the earth
By death, which constantly
Tries its power upon it.
Is it today in the Kingdom of Light,
Tomorrow it is flung into misery,
Plunged deep in woe and tears.
On joy follow tears,
On tears follows the judge,
On the judge follows death.
And wandering in the labyrinth
It seeks in vain for escape.
Jesus said: Look, Father,
Upon this tormented being,
How far from thy breath
It wanders sorrowful upon earth.
It seeks to flee the bitter chaos,
But knows not how to win through.
For its sake send me, Father;
Bearing the seals will I descend,
Whole aeons will I travel through,
All mysteries will I open,
And the forms of gods will I display;
And the hidden things of the holy way
—Gnosis I call it—I will bestow.

An older 1906 translation by G.R.S. Mead:

First [was there] Mind the Generative Law of All;
Second to the Firstborn was Liquid Chaos;
Third Soul through toil received the Law.
Wherefore, with a deer's form surrounding her,
She labours at her task beneath Death's rule.
Now, holding sway, she sees the Light;
And now, cast into piteous plight, she weeps;
Now she weeps, and now rejoices;
Now she weeps, and now is judged;
Now is judged, and now she dieth;
Now is born, with no way out for her; in misery
She enters in her wandering the labyrinth of ills.
And Jesus said: O Father, see! [Behold] the struggle still of ills on earth!
Far from Thy Breath away she wanders!
She seeks to flee the bitter Chaos,
And knows not how she shall pass through.
Wherefore, send me, O Father!
Seals in my hands, I will descend;
Through Æons universal will I make a Path;
Through Mysteries all I'll open up a Way!
And Forms of Gods will I display;
The secrets of the Holy Path I will hand on,
And call them Gnosis.

— G.R.S. Mead (translator)

== Analysis ==
In this document, reason and chaos, the intelligent and the material world, stand opposed. Between them is the human soul, belonging to both spheres, yet striving toward the higher and the spiritual. The soul is unable to ascend to the higher spheres by its own power; therefore, a heavenly being (in this fragment, Jesus Christ), in accordance with the will of the supreme principle or God, descends into the human world and redeems the soul by showing it the way through the spheres which sunder it from the divine world. It is not merely a thirst for knowledge that impels the Gnostics, but the pursuit of salvation, because the Gnostic's salvation depends on the possession of Gnosis respecting these things.

Like Gnosticism in general, the Ophites teach the existence of a Supreme Being, standing infinitely high above the visible world. This being is described as purely spiritual, the primal basis of all things, the starting-point of the cosmic process. His names are Father of the Universe, First Man, the "Uncreated," the "Unspeakable," the "Unapproachable God." He is self-evolving, and thus becomes the source of all being. The first products of this spontaneous evolution still belong to the purely spiritual spheres. The Ophitic theology tends to separate this supreme God into an ever-increasing number of separate entities. In the Naassene Fragment, only the Son is mentioned beside the Father; but a tetrad occurs among the Ophites of Irenaeus and the Naassenes; an entire decad among the Gnostici Barbelo; while the Nag Hammadi writings mention a countless host of higher beings. The Supreme Being's mode of evolution is set forth, sometimes as a generative process and sometimes as a psychological one. Frequently the two ideas are combined. Some pagan mythology lies obviously at the root of the matter: this would also account for their syzygial views, since the Ophites at least partly aimed to interpret the ancient myths as psychological processes. Against the Supreme Being stands chaos, the material principle. Yet there is no sharp dualism here. In the fragment, the phrase "the firstborn's emitted chaos" implies that it is derived from a higher being. Chaos is only an evil power or an active principle in a very few instances. It is not the existence of chaos which contradicts perfection, but rather the mixture of luminous parts with material elements. This mixture, in a word, is the great calamity, the loss that must be retrieved through redemption. How did this mixture come to pass? The fragment designates the soul, the principle of this compound, as the common product of mind and chaos. This agrees with the theory of the Perates and Sethians, as mentioned by Hippolytus. These sects most nearly approach the dualistic scheme, yet the latter is not distinctly defined. In Justin, also, dualism is diminished.

Walter Bauer, citing Richard Reitzenstein, argues that the fragment was likely adapted from an originally pagan work but modified with Christian and Gnostic additions, perhaps by replacing references to Attis (or whatever Greek or Roman god the hymn originally addressed) to Jesus.
