= Our Lady of Endor Coven =

Satanic cult

Our Lady of Endor Coven, also known as Ophite Cultus Sathanas, was an American Satanic group founded by Herbert Arthur Sloane (born September 3, 1905, died June 16, 1975) in Cleveland, Ohio, with a claimed origin in 1948 though definitive documentation of the group does not appear until the 1960s. Heavily influenced by Gnosticism, the group equated Sathanas with the Serpent in the Garden of Eden as revealer of true knowledge.

== Namesakes ==
The term "Ophite" refers to the ancient gnostic sect of the Ophites, who revered the Serpent of Eden. The Latin phrase Cultus Sathanas translates to "Cult of Satan".

The "Lady of Endor" refers to the Witch of Endor, a woman in the Hebrew Bible said to summon spirits of the deceased.

== Date of origin ==
A 1967 Toledo newspaper interview with Sloane about his occult and fortune telling business made no mention of the Coven. Sloane became a member of the Church of Satan on January 4, 1968. In his introductory letter, he stated he had seen the Church in the news media starting in late 1966. In his membership documents and correspondence, Sloane stated that he headed a coven started in about 1930 but disbanded in March of 1967. Available documents indicate otherwise.

Sloane's Coven was first publicly documented on December 1, 1968, when British occult writer Richard Cavendish wrote in The Observer that he had received a letter from a Satanist "lodge" in Toledo, Ohio. The very next day, the European correspondent for the Toledo Blade reported it in that newspaper.

The earliest reporting of anyone other than Sloane himself having any affiliation with such a group was on October 13, 1969 when a reporter interviewed Sloane and an unnamed U.S. Air Force captain who self-identified as a witch. This was just under two months after Sloane resigned from the Church of Satan in a letter dated August 22, 1968.

While current scholars of Satanism point to the lack of evidence that Ophite Cultus Sathanas existed prior to 1966, some conclude the group likely had earlier roots:

It seems probable the group was in existence before 1966, although I have not found any traces of it in literature prior to that date. Sloane himself suggested that he was already operating in the 1940s, but given the many parallels with Wicca the group displayed, it is more likely its date of origin must be located sometime after 1953, the year Gerald Gardner's neopagan cult of witchcraft came into the open.

A more robust assessment of the documented historical evidence by Massimo Introvigne, managing director of the Center for Studies on New Religions, concluded that "Sloane claimed that he had started his Satanist coven in 1948, eighteen years before the Church of Satan was founded" but "no independent evidence exists" for that claim. Introvigne bluntly writes that Sloane "tried to claim that his satanic activities pre-dated LaVey, but we have only his word for it."

== Beliefs ==
Sloane had a Protestant upbringing. Sloane referred in his June 1968 letter to his group as "Our Lady of Endor Coven, The Ophitic Cultus Sathanas" and clarifies that it was Sathanas in the form of the Serpent who brought the knowledge (gnosis) of the true God to Eve when she ate of the Tree of Knowledge. This true God is above the creator god of this world. He writes that Cain was the first Satanic priest and performed the first Satanic Mass (which explains Cain being punished by the creator god).

According to Sloane, true Satanists are following the way of the Serpent and of Cain, as the early ophitic gnostics were. Hans Jonas offered this gnostic analysis:

... it is the serpent that persuades Adam and Eve to taste of the fruit of knowledge and thereby to disobey their Creator ... Indeed, more than one gnostic sect derived its name from the cult of the serpent ("Ophites" from the Gk. ophis; "Naassenes" from the Heb. nahas--the group as a whole being termed "ophitic")

This general Serpent is also the wise Word of Eve. This is the mystery of Eden: this is the river that flows out of Eden. This is also the mark that was set on Cain, whose sacrifice the god of this world [the creator god] did not accept whereas he accepted the bloody sacrifice of Abel: for the lord of this world delights in blood.

Sloane believed in a horned god, which he said was revealed to him in the woods when he was a child. This horned god, according to him, was the original and most ancient god ever worshipped by humans (he explains that anthropology has proven this). After seeing Margaret Murray's book The God of the Witches (published in 1931), he said he realized that the horned god was Satan (Sathanas). Sloane had become very active in the Spiritualist Church movement, being a minister in a Spiritualist Church since the 1930s, and traveling to various locations in Ohio to perform services. He describes his coven of Sathanas as developing out of his occupation with Spiritualism.

Sloane also corresponded with his contemporary Gerald Gardner (the founder of the Wicca movement, who died in 1964), concerning Sloane's interest in portraying true witches as worshiping Satan, or "Sathanas", a view which Gardner himself fought against in his writings. However, Sloane believed that, while "gnosis" referred to knowledge, and "wicca" referred to wisdom, modern witches had fallen away from the true knowledge, and instead had begun worshipping a fertility god, a reflection of the creator god.

When the Church of Satan appeared in the 1960s, Sloane began corresponding with Anton LaVey, with an interest in finding more Satanists to participate in his own organization. Sloane highly recommended the 1958 book The Gnostic Religion, and selections from it were sometimes read at ceremonies.

== See also ==
- Magical organization
