= Monoimus =

Monoimus (lived somewhere between 150 - 210 CE) was an Arab gnostic (Arabic name Munʿim منعم), who was known only from one account in Theodoret (Haereticarum Fabularum Compendium i. 18) until a lost work of anti-heretical writings (Refutation of All Heresies, book 8, chapter V) by Hippolytus was found. He is known for coining the usage of the word Monad in a Gnostic context. Hippolytus claims that Monoimus was a follower of Tatian, and that his cosmological system was derived from that of the Pythagoreans, which indeed seems probable. But it was also clearly inspired by Christianity, monism and Gnosticism.

According to Monoimus, the world is created from the Monad (or iota, or Yod meaning "one horn"), a tittle that brings forth the duad, triad, tetrad, pentad, hexad, heptad, ogdoad, ennead, up to ten, producing a decad. He thus possibly identifies the gnostic aeons with the first elements of the Pythagorean cosmology. He identifies these divisions of different entities with the description of creation in Genesis. This description from Hippolytus also corresponds to two versions of a text called Epistle of Eugnostos found in Nag Hammadi, where the same monad to decad relationship is described. (Eugnostos in turn, has apparent resemblances to the gnostic text The Sophia of Jesus Christ, where the word monad appears again.)

== Doctrine ==
Monoimus is famous for his quote about the unity of God and man (from Hippolytus):

Omitting to seek after God, and creation, and things similar to these, seek for Him from (out of) thyself, and learn who it is that absolutely appropriates (unto Himself) all things in thee, and says, "My God my mind, my understanding, my soul, my body." And learn from whence are sorrow, and joy, and love, and hatred, and involuntary wakefulness, and involuntary drowsiness, and involuntary anger, and involuntary affection; and if you accurately investigate these (points), you will discover (God) Himself, unity and plurality, in thyself, according to that tittle, and that He finds the outlet (for Deity) to be from thyself.

This idea resembles the viewpoint of the much later Sufi Ibn Arabi, but no connection between the two is known. The starting point is the ascription in the New Testament of the work of creation to the Son of Man, whence it was inferred that the first principle was properly called Man. It follows that it is a mistake to look for God in creation; we must seek Him in ourselves, and can best find Him by the study of the involuntary operations of our own soul. The relation between the "Man" and "Son of Man" exists from beyond time. The latter is derived from the former, but, it would seem, by an immediate and eternal necessity of His nature, just as from fire is necessarily derived the light which renders it visible. Thus, concerning the first principle, the Scriptures speak both of a "being" and a "becoming" (ēn kai egeneto), the first word properly applying to the "Man," the second to the "Son of Man." in order to illustrate how in this first principle are combined unity and multiplicity, perfect simplicity with the most contradictory attributes, we are referred to the Greek letter ι, the single stroke of which represents units; and which also represents the number ten. Then again from the units all other numbers flow. The process of creation is further illustrated by a mathematical theory of the generation from numbers of the regular solids, and from those the elementary bodies are supposed to be formed. A type of the activity of the Son of Man, who works all the transformations of nature, is found in Moses' rod; which was also an iota, a single branch, but having a tenfold operation. The speculations of Monoimus, as reported to us, only relate to the work of creation; we are not told whether he had any theory as to the problem of redemption.

The use made by Monoimus of the phrases "Man" and "Son of Man" reminds us of the system of the Naassenes (Hippol. Ref. § 7), and a closer examination shows that this is no chance coincidence, and that Monoimus is really to be referred to that sect, although Hippolytus himself has classed them separately; for Monoimus describes his first principle as bisexual, and applies to it the titles "Father, Mother, the two immortal names," words taken out of a Naassene hymn. But there is a common source of this language in the Apophasis Megale of Simon, this passage also being clearly the original of the description given by Monoimus of the contradictory attributes of his first principle. Further traces of the obligations of Monoimus to Simon are found in the reference to the six powers instrumental in creation, which answer to Simon's six "roots," while a similar indebtedness to Simon on the part of the Naassene writer in Hippolytus is found on comparing the anatomical speculations connected with the name Eden (v. 9; vi. 14). A more doubtful question is whether there be any relation of obligation between Monoimus and the Clementine Homilies, there being in both a contrast drawn between the "Son of Man" and those who are "born of women" (Hom. ii. 17). Monoimus has mysteries in connexion with the number 14, showing that he attached importance to Paschal celebration.
