= Perates =

The Perates or Peratae (Greek: Περατής, "to pass through"; πέρας, "to penetrate") were a Gnostic sect from the 2nd century AD. The Philosophumena of Hippolytus is our only real source of information on their origin and beliefs. The founders of the school were a certain Euphrates (whom Origen calls the founder of those Ophites to whom Celsus referred about 175 AD) and Celbes, elsewhere called Acembes and Ademes.

It had been known from Clement of Alexandria that there was a sect of that name, though he tells nothing as to its tenets. Hippolytus was acquainted with more books of the sect than one. One called Oi Proasteioi appears to have been of an astrological character, treating of the influence of the stars upon the human race, and connecting various mythologies with the planetary powers. There was besides a treatise which resembles the doctrine of the Naassenes.

== Etymology ==
The title "Peratic," as applied to the sect, is explained by Clement of Alexandria as one derived from place. In this sense it may have taken its origin from the phrase Ἅβραμ ὁ περατής (Genesis 14:13, LXX), which was understood to mean one who came from the other side of the Euphrates. Pliny, speaking of a certain gum which came from Arabia, India, Media, and Babylon, adds that that which came from Media was called by some Peratic. This seems to be the same as the Peratic frankincense spoken of by Arrian. It is probably a mere corruption that Sophronius of Jerusalem speaks of Euphrates "Persicus," for he clearly got the name from Theodoret; yet the corruption may have originated in the change of an unfamiliar word into a supposed equivalent. On the whole, we may conclude that this Euphrates, if he existed, came from the extreme east.

Bunsen has suggested that this designation can mean Euboean. He founds this conjecture on the facts that Acembes, with whom Euphrates is coupled, came from Euboea, and that Euboea is sometimes spoken of as ἡ πέραν, the other side. But this does not prove that the name "Peratic" would ever have been understood as equivalent to "Euboean;" it is nowhere stated that Euphrates and Acembes were fellow countrymen, and if they were, it is not likely that the one would have been designated after his town and the other generally after the island.

== History ==
Hippolytus, followed by Theodoret, speaks of the Peratae as founded by Euphrates the "Peratic," and Acembes the Carystian. There is certainly a case for suspicion that this Euphrates the Peratic, the supposed founder of the sect of Peratics, may be as mythical a personage as Ebion, the eponymous founder of the Ebionites. We do not read elsewhere of any Euphrates but the Stoic philosopher, who lived in the reign of Hadrian, whom we cannot suppose to have been a teacher of Ophite doctrine. But the name of the river Euphrates was largely used among the Peratae with a mystical signification; and it is conceivable that members of the sect, knowing the name to be held in honour among them, and knowing also that there had been an eminent teacher so called, may have been led to claim him as their founder. On the other hand, it is plain that the Peratic treatise of which Hippolytus gives an abstract, and which may have been also seen by Origen, contained the name of Euphrates coupled with that of Acembes the Carystian, a personage whom there was no motive for inventing. There is nothing incredible in the supposition that these are the names of real Ophite teachers, too obscure to leave any record of their existence, outside their own sect.

== Beliefs ==
=== Cosmology ===
According to the Peratics, the cosmos is one, but also consists of a threefold division; this rendering of the cosmos they symbolized by a circle circumscribing a triangle. The circle denoted the unity and oneness of the cosmos, while the triangle represented the "Three Worlds" of Patēr, Huios, Hulē [Greek: πατηρ, ὕιος, ὕλη]. These "three Minds" or "three Gods," as they were called, each possessed certain characteristics:

- Patēr (Father) — the unbegotten perfect-goodness; megethos patrikon (Paternal Greatness)
- Huios (Son) — agathon autogenes (self-begotten goodness/perfection)
- Hulē — basic matter or unformed substance, gennēton (begotten/created)

In this conception of the cosmos, the Son sits as an intermediary between the immovable source of all existence (the Father) and the formless chaos of matter. The Son, as the Word [λογος] and represented by an ever-turning Serpent, first faces the Father, collecting the outflow of divine powers (or Ideas, Forms), then turns to face Hulē, pouring the powers upon the Matter. It is in this way that formless Hulē is transformed into material reality, the sensible cosmos that mirrors the divine, noetic one from which it receives its existence. By this way, the humans born from matter would have received their souls, portions of divine power. This process is akin to several other cosmogonic conceptions of the ancient world (especially those found in Stoicism (see also Stoic Physics), Platonism (see also Plato's Theory of Forms), Neoplatonism, Hermetism, and Aristotelian hylomorphism).

The Peratic conception of the cosmos was used to explain certain biblical verse. For example, when, Jesus says, "Your Father which is in heaven," they understood him to mean Patēr, the heavenly father, the first principle, from which the forms have been derived. But when he says "your father was a murderer from the beginning," he means the ruler and framer of Hulē, who, taking the forms transmitted by the Son, works generation in the material cosmos, a work which is destruction and death (because of the transitory nature of the world of becoming).

=== Rebellion ===
Peratic doctrine tells how some of the divinities that ruled the created universe under the three levels revolted and became evil. Those Archons were planets and constellations, and were identified with deities like Zeus/Jupiter, Cronus/Saturn, Osiris, Isis, Hades and Persephone, as well as heroes like Heracles/Hercules and Perseus. Among them, Cronus would have enslaved the humans' spirits in a cycle of generation and destruction.

In order to save the world from those gods, Christ was made to descend in the days of Herod, from the region of the unbegotten, a man himself threefold, having in himself powers from the three parts of the world, "for in Him the whole Pleroma was pleased to dwell bodily," and in Him was the whole Godhead. When he was crucified, he became another celestial ruler over all of them, taking control of the constellation of Draco and opening the door of the divine power, through which human souls would be able to escape.

The evil gods would be separated and left for punishment, while their third of the cosmos would be destroyed. When it is said "the Son of Man came not to destroy the world, but that the world through Him might be saved," by "the world" is meant the two superior parts, to agenneton and to autogenneton. When the Scripture says "that we should not be condemned with the world," by the world is meant the third part or the kosmos idikos; for that part must be destroyed, but the two superior parts freed from destruction.

When the Saviour comes into the world, he would attract to himself those whose nature is such as to be capable of receiving his influence. Such persons are called Peratae because, by means of their gnosis they have learned how safely to pass through (perasai) the corruption to which everything that is generated is subject.

=== Physiology ===
All the ignorant are Egyptians. Egypt is the body, coming out of Egypt is coming out of the body, and passing the Red Sea, that is the water of destruction; or, in other words, generation. Those, however, who suppose themselves to have passed the Red Sea, are still liable to be assailed by the gods of destruction, whom Moses called the serpents of the desert, who bite and destroy those who had hoped to escape the power of the gods of generation. For these Moses exhibited the true and perfect serpent, on whom they who believed were not bitten by the gods of destruction. None but this true serpent, the perfect of the perfect, can save and deliver those who go out of Egypt, that is to say from the body and from the world.

We are given additional insight by Hippolytus into what G.R.S. Mead calls an "analogical psycho-physiological process in man":

For a proof of this, they adduce the anatomy of the brain, assimilating, from the fact of its immobility, the brain itself to the Father, and the cerebellum to the Son, because of its being moved and being of the form of (the head of) a serpent. And they allege that this (cerebellum), by an ineffable and inscrutable process, attracts through the pineal gland the spiritual and life-giving substance emanating from the vaulted chamber (in which the brain is embedded). And on receiving this, the cerebellum in an ineffable manner imparts the ideas, just as the Son does, to matter; or, in other words, the seeds and the genera of the things produced according to the flesh flow along into the spinal marrow. Employing this exemplar, (the heretics) seem to adroitly introduce their secret mysteries, which are delivered in silence.

== See also ==
- Ophites
- Naassenes
- Sethians
- Mandaeans
- Borborites
