= Nehushtan =

Brass serpent in Torah

In the biblical Books of Kings (2 Kings 18:4; written c. 550 BC), the Nehushtan (/nəˈhʊʃtən/; Hebrew: נְחֻשְׁתָּן, romanized: Nəḥuštān [nəħuʃtaːn]) is the bronze image of a serpent on a pole. The image is described in the Book of Numbers, where Yahweh instructed Moses to erect it so that the Israelites who saw it would be cured and be protected from dying from the bites of the "fiery serpents", which Yahweh had sent to punish them for speaking against him and Moses (Numbers 21:4–9).

According to 2 Kings 18:4, King Hezekiah instituted an iconoclastic reform: "He abolished the shrines, smashed the pillars, and cut down the sacred post. He also broke into pieces the bronze serpent that Moses had made, for until that time, the Israelites had been offering sacrifices to it; it was called Nehushtan." Historical research in several Canaanite cities has discovered the cultic use of bronze serpents. It may have represented traces of an older medical and healing tradition which extended beyond the Levant.

== Etymology ==
"Nehushtan" is a pun evoking both the Hebrew words nāḥāš (נָחָשׁ, snake) and nəḥošeṯ (נְחשֶׁת, brass), and thus may mean "The (Great) Serpent" or "The (Great) Brass".

== Alternative translations ==
The English Standard Version of the Bible and the majority of contemporary English translations refer to the serpent as made of "bronze", whereas the King James Version and a number of other versions state "brass". 2 Kings 18:4 is translated as "brasen" in the King James Version. The Douay-Rheims 1899 edition has "brazen". Eugene H. Peterson, in his paraphrase of the Bible The Message (2002), opted for "a snake of fiery copper".

== Serpent image ==
Snake cults had been well established in Canaan in the Bronze Age: archaeologists have uncovered serpent cult objects in Bronze Age strata at several pre-Israelite cities in Canaan: two at Megiddo, one at Gezer, one in the sanctuary of the Area H temple at Tel Hazor and two at Shechem. Cultic serpent imagery was not isolated to Canaan. It appeared in surrounding areas, including the Esagila or temple of Marduk as tutelary deity in Babylon, where pairs of bronze serpents were erected beside each entrance to the temple.

According to Lowell K. Handy, the Nehushtan may have been the symbol of a deity for snakebite cure within the Temple in Jerusalem.

== In scriptures ==
=== Hebrew Bible ===
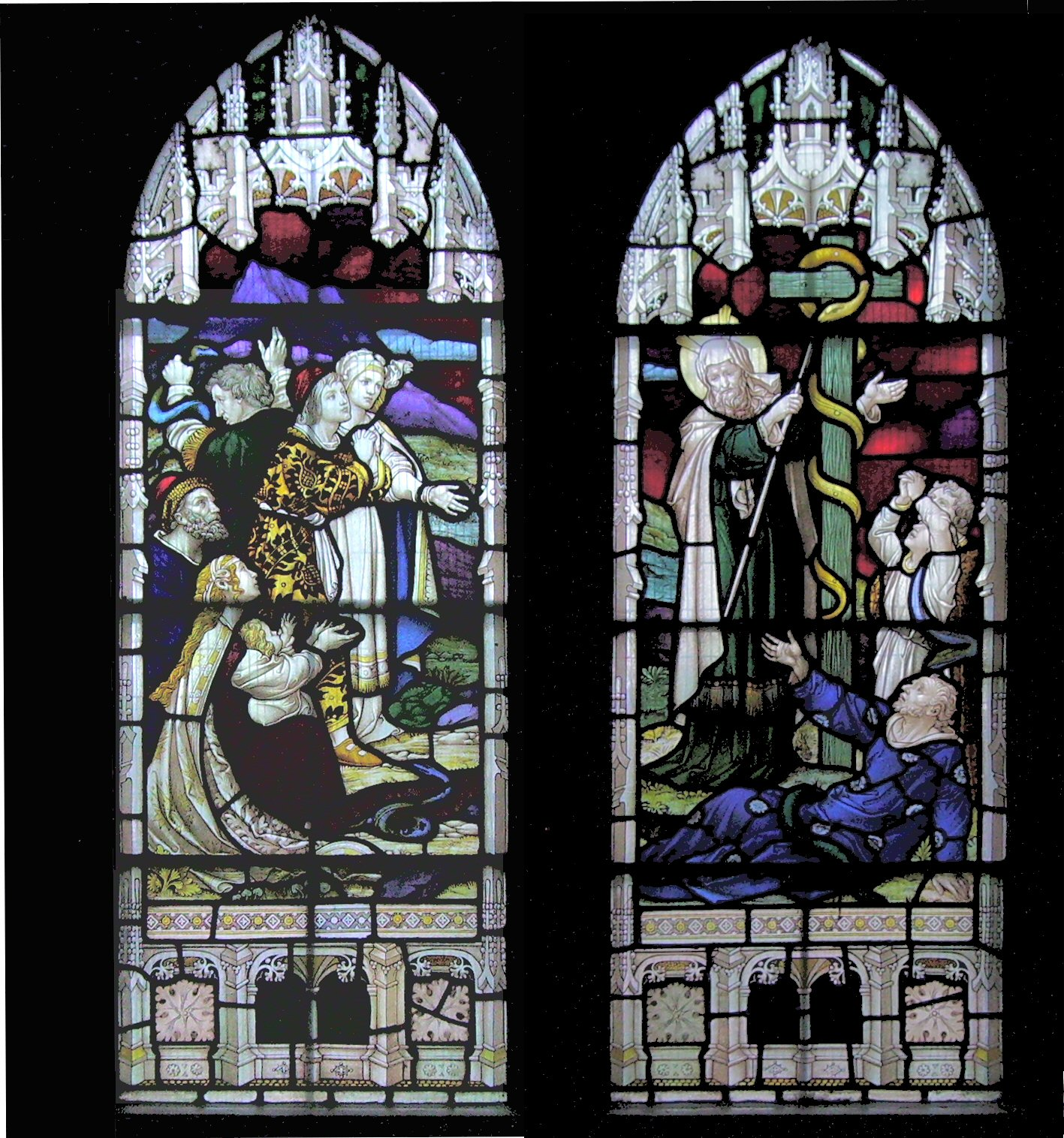
Moses lifts up the brass snake in a photograph of the stained glass window at St Mark's Church, Gillingham

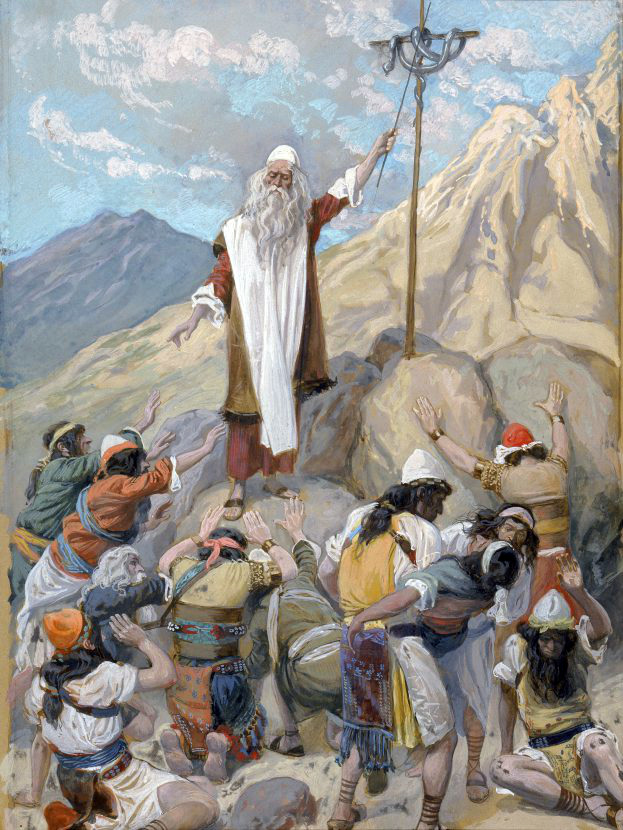
The Brazen Serpent (watercolor circa 1896–1902 by James Tissot)

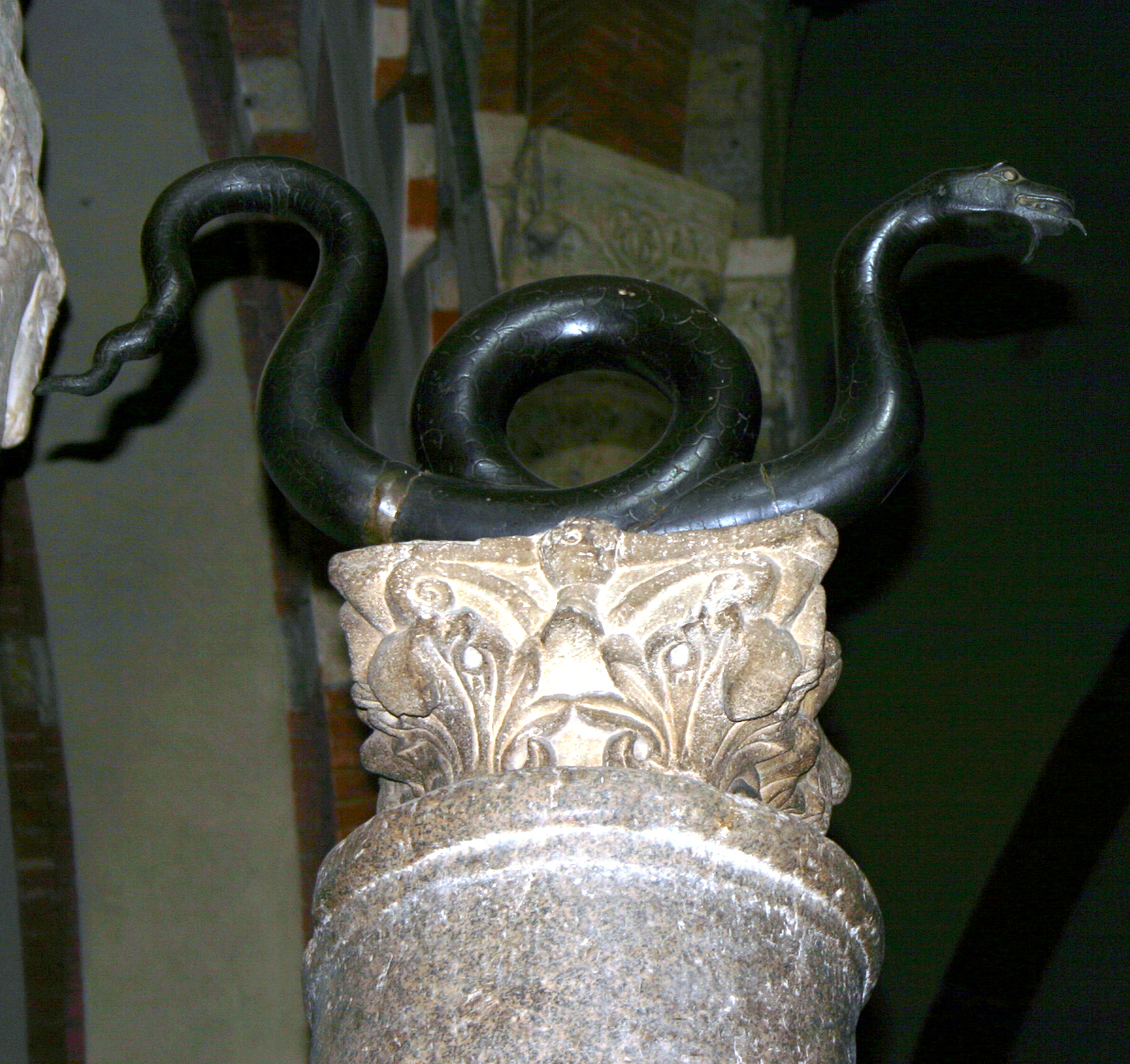
The Basilica of Sant'Ambrogio in Milan has a Roman column and, on top of it, a bronze serpent donated by emperor Basil II in 1007. It may be the origin of the biscione/bissa symbol of Milan.

In the biblical story, following their Exodus from Egypt, the Israelites set out from Mount Hor to go to the Red Sea. However they had to detour around the land of Edom (Numbers 20:21, 25). Impatient, they complained against Yahweh and Moses (Numbers 21:4–5), and in response God sent "fiery serpents" among them and many died. The people came to Moses to repent and asked him to ask God to take away the serpents. Verse 9 says, "Moses made a copper serpent and mounted it on a standard; and when bitten by a serpent, anyone who looked at the copper serpent would recover."

The term appears in 2 Kings 18:4 in a passage describing reforms made by King Hezekiah, in which he tore down the high places, cut down symbols of Asherah, destroyed the Nehushtan, and according to many Bible translations, gave it that name.

Regarding the passage in 2 Kings 18:4, M. G. Easton noted that "the lapse of nearly one thousand years had invested the 'brazen serpent' with a mysterious sanctity; and in order to deliver the people from their infatuation, and impress them with the idea of its worthlessness, Hezekiah called it, in contempt, 'Nehushtan', a brazen thing, a mere piece of brass".

The tradition of naming it Nehushtan is not considered older than Hezekiah's time.

=== New Testament ===
In the Gospel of John, Jesus makes a comparison between the raising up of the Son of Man and raising of the serpent by Moses to heal the people. Jesus says "And just as Moses lifted up the serpent in the wilderness, so must the Son of Man be lifted up". (John 3:14)

Charles Spurgeon preached a famous sermon on "the Mysteries of the Brazen Serpent" and this passage from John's Gospel in 1857.

=== Book of Mormon ===
In the Book of Mormon, three prophets make reference to this event. The first is the prophet Nephi, son of Lehi in a general discourse, the second is many years later by the prophet Alma, and the third is years later by Alma's great-grandson also named Nephi. Nephi tells the people that many of the Israelites perished because of the simplicity and faith required i.e., "and the labor which they had to perform was to look; and because of the simpleness of the way, or the easiness of it, there were many who perished." In the latter narrative, Alma tells the people of Antionum that many of the Israelites died because they lacked the faith to look at the brazen serpent. He then compared the brazen serpent to a type of Christ and exhorted the people to look to Christ and spiritually live. These same themes from Alma were reiterated by Nephi in the Book of Helaman.

== Rabbinic literature ==
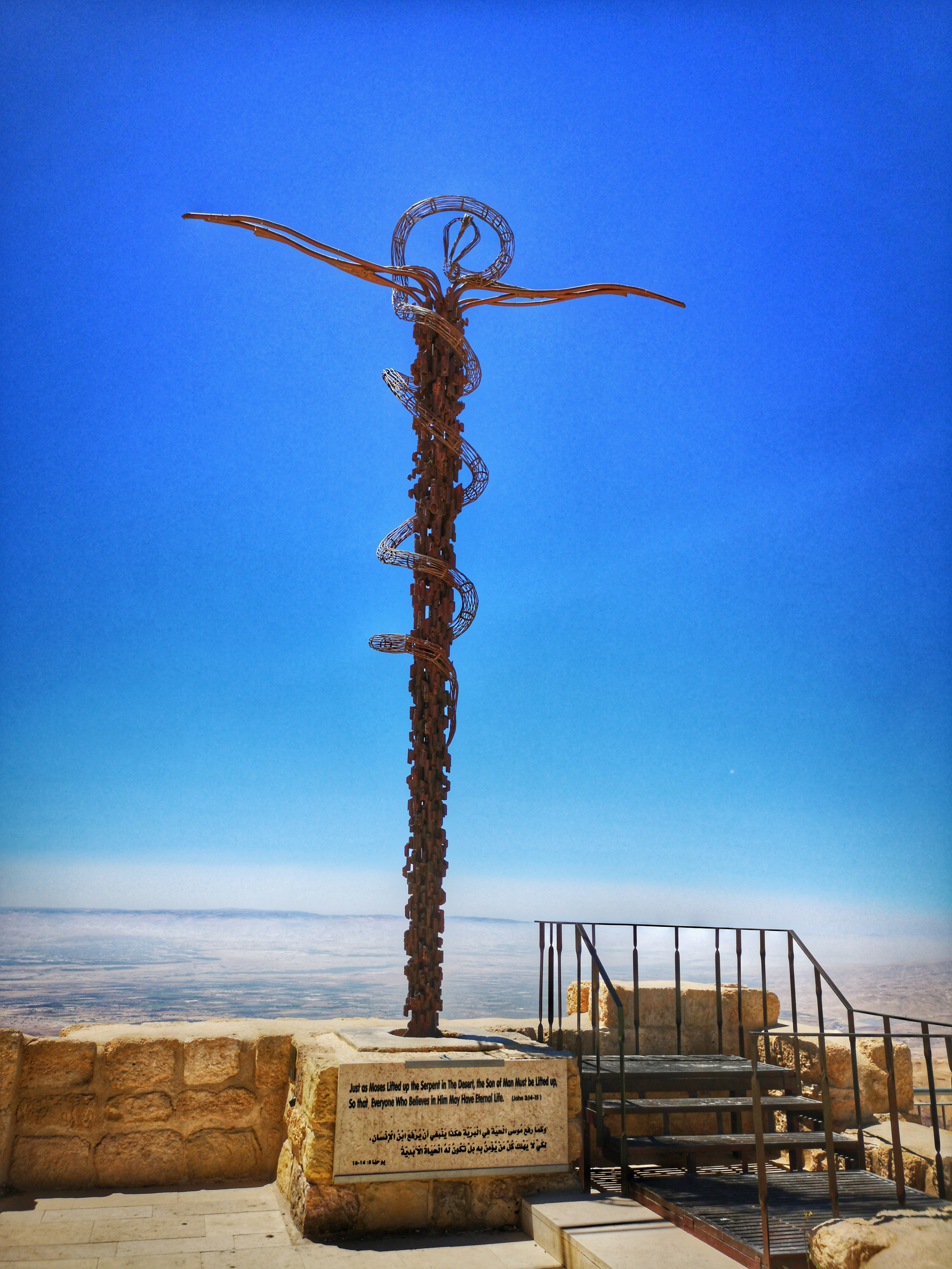
A modern monument of the bronze serpent (which Moses erected in the Negev desert) on Mount Nebo, in front of the church of Saint Moses (2018).

Inasmuch as the serpent in the Talmud stands for such evils as talebearing and slander (Genesis 3:4–5), the Midrash finds in the plague of the fiery serpents a punishment for sins of the evil tongue (Numbers 21:5). God said: "Let the serpent who was the first to offend by 'evil tongue' inflict punishment on those who were guilty of the same sin and did not profit by the serpent's example".

One of the Israelites' complaints in this case was dissatisfaction with the manna. The manna is said to have had any taste desired by the eater (Shemot Rabbah 25:3), but to the serpent all things tasted of dust, in accord with its punishment: "And dust shalt thou eat all the days of thy life" (Genesis 3:14). Therefore those who grumbled at the food of any desired taste should well be punished through the creature who tasted only dust (Tan., ed. Buber, Ḥuḳḳat, xlv. [337]; Midrash R. Num. xix. 22).

The Mishnah takes symbolically the words "Every one who was bitten by a serpent would look at the serpent and live". The people should look up to the God of heaven who gives life and death, not the serpent (Mishnah R. H. 3:8, B. Talmud R.H. 29a). In the course of time, however, the people lost sight of this higher meaning and worshipped the serpent itself as the healing power, compelling Hezekiah to destroy it (2 Kings 18:4; see also Ber. 10a).

Along with commentators such as Heinrich Ewald ("Gesch. des Volkes Israel," iii. 669, note 5), the Talmudists asked: "Where was the brazen serpent till the time of Hezekiah?". They proposed that Asa and Joshaphat, when clearing away the idols, purposely left the brazen serpent behind so that Hezekiah might also win merit by breaking it (Ḥul. 6b).

== Debated origins ==
Old Testament scholar H. H. Rowley proposed that Nehushtan, as it was known during Hezekiah's reign, originated outside Yahwism despite being regarded as a symbol of Yahweh at the time of its destruction by Hezekiah. Rowley theorized that the bronze serpent was a symbol of serpent worship associated with a Canaanite god in Jerusalem before the Israelite conquest, which was then adapted by them. W.W.G. Baudissin dates this adaptation between 850 and 750 B.C.E. Egyptologist Henry Hall althernatively suggested that the serpent image was carried by the Israelites from Egypt, which had a well-known sympathetic magic practice to defend against snake bites.

Rowley notes that there is no record of Nehushtan before Hezekiah except for the Numbers 21 story of Moses. He argues that had Nehushtan been brought into Jerusalem as a genuine holy relic of Moses, there would be a record of its arrival or transfer. Lacking such a record, he proposes that the bronze serpent of ancient Jerusalem gradually became associated with Moses' Nehushtan through syncretism, a gradual fusion of Canaanite and Israelite beliefs and customs. Symbols of the new and old religions may have been erected side by side as a conciliatory political maneuver.

Hebraist and Old Testament scholar R. H. Kennett hypothesized that Moses made the Brazen Serpent, and that the Ark of the Covenant was created specifically to contain it; also that it was maintained after the time of Moses by priests after fleeing from Shiloh to Nob, or it accompanied the Ark as it was carried off by the Philistines. This is not widely accepted due to no known tradition or association between the Serpent and Ark.

== In art ==
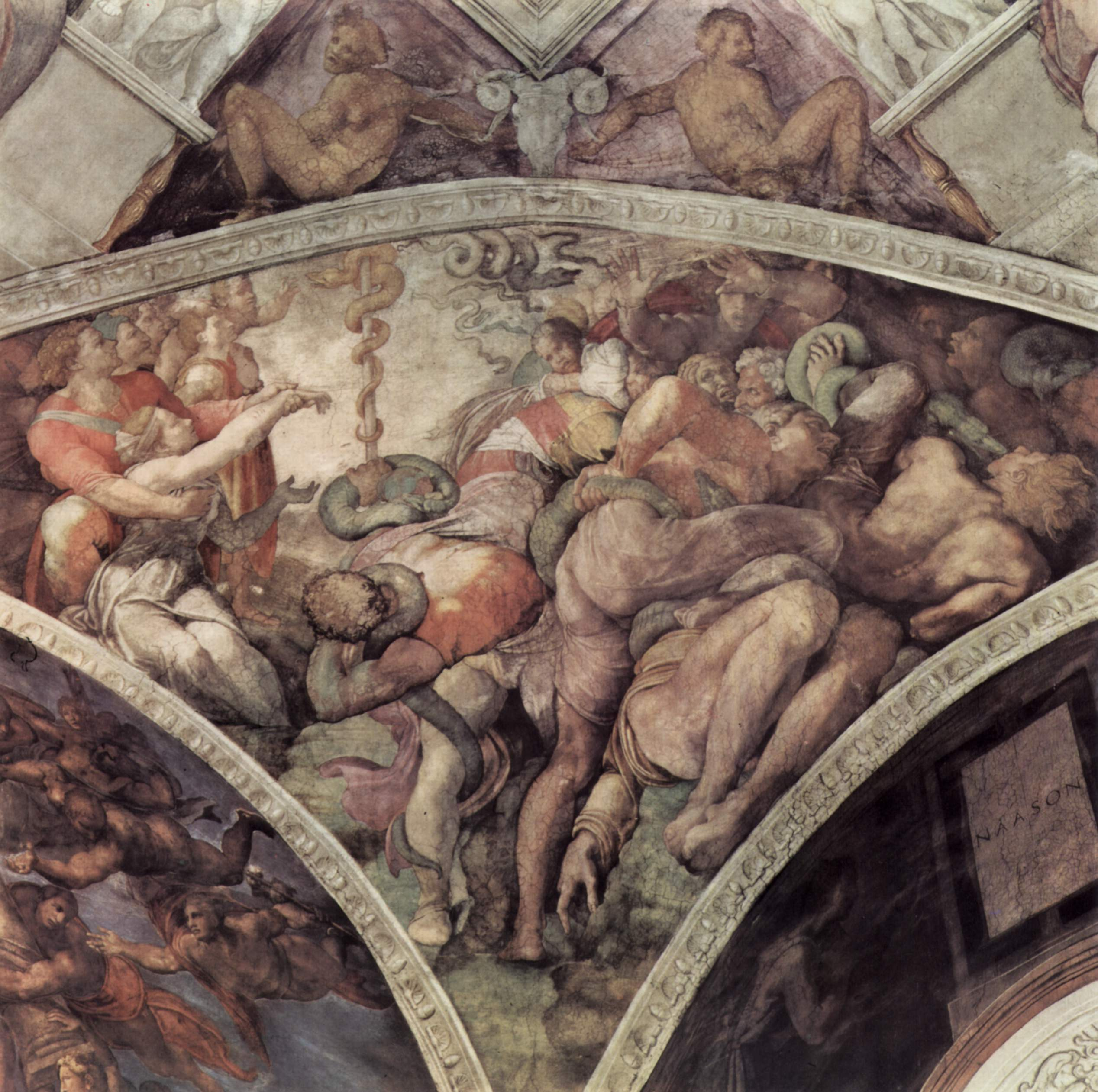
In 1508 Michelangelo's image of the Israelites deliverance from the plague of serpents by the creation of the bronze serpent, on the ceiling of the Sistine Chapel.

There is a Brazen Serpent Monument on Mount Nebo in Jordan created by Italian artist Giovanni Fantoni. Similarly, on the ceiling of the Sistine Chapel, Michelangelo painted a mural of the Israelites' deliverance from the plague of serpents by the creation of the bronze serpent.

== See also ==
- Caduceus
- Naassenes
- Nāga
- Nahusha in Hindu mythology, a king who became a serpent
- Ningishzida
- Ophites
- Rod of Asclepius
- Serpent Column
- Serpent symbolism
- Snake worship
- Staff of Moses
- Teraphim
- Uraeus
- Wadjet
