= The Worship of the Serpent =

1833 study by John Bathurst Deane

The Worship of the Serpent is an 1833 study, written by the clergyman John Bathurst Deane, of snake worship and specifically the snake mentioned in the Book of Genesis who convinced Eve to eat the fruit of the Tree of the Knowledge of Good and Evil, leading her to convince Adam to do the same.

== Overview ==
Deane draws a number of conclusions and makes certain guesses regarding snake worship, not just confined to Europe, but indeed all over the world. Deane goes on in his title to list a number of associations to the serpent such as the dragon and the leviathan. So thorough (albeit outdated) is his research, that he has "traced THE WORSHIP OF THE SERPENT from Babylonia, east and west, through Persia, Hindûstan, China, Mexico, Britain, Scandinavia, Italy, Illyricum, Thrace, Greece, Asia Minor, and Phœnicia." (Ch VIII)

== See also ==
- Ophites
- Serpents in the Bible
- Snake worship
