= Refutation of All Heresies =

Christian anti-pagan polemic

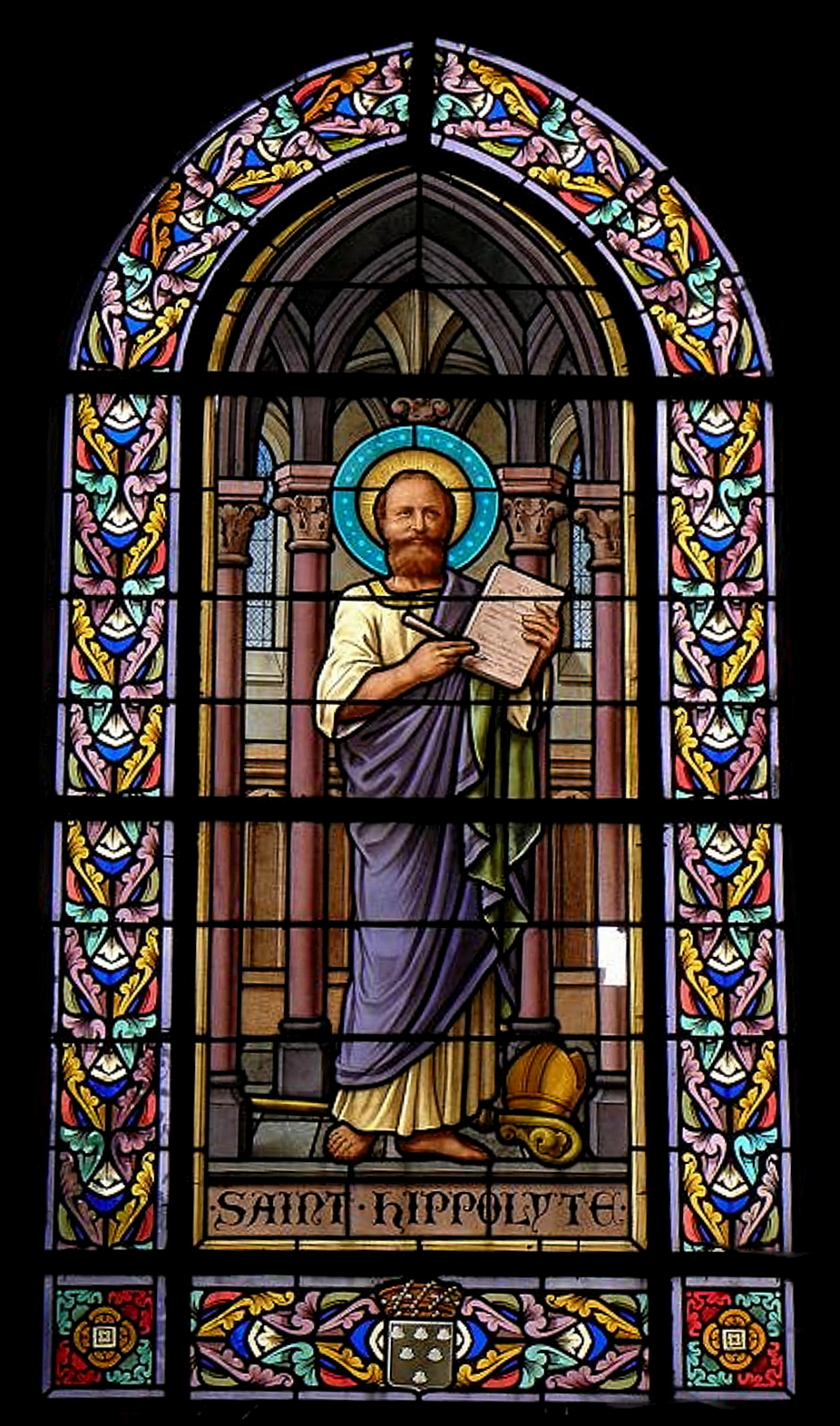
Hippolytus of Rome in stained glass

The Refutation of All Heresies (Ancient Greek: Φιλοσοφούμενα ή κατὰ πασῶν αἱρέσεων ἔλεγχος, romanized: Philosophoumena hē kata pasōn haireseōn elenchos; Latin: Refutatio Omnium Haeresium), also called the Elenchus or Philosophumena, is a compendious Christian polemical work of the early third century, whose attribution to Hippolytus of Rome or an unknown "Pseudo-Hippolytus" is disputed. It catalogues both pagan beliefs and 33 gnostic Christian systems deemed heretical by the author/s and/or compiler/s, making it a major source of information on contemporary opponents of Christian orthodoxy as understood today.

The first book, a synopsis of Greek philosophy, circulated separately in several manuscripts and was known as the Philosophoumena (Ancient Greek: Φιλοσοφούμενα "philosophical teachings"), a title which some extend to the whole work. Books IV–X were recovered in 1842 in a manuscript at Mount Athos, while books II and III remain lost. The work was long attributed to the early Christian theologian Origen.

== Contents ==
This work is divided into ten books, 8 of which have survived more or less intact. Books II and III, however, have not been unearthed, and their contents remain the subject of conjecture.

Book I offers a summary of the thought of various ancient Greek philosophers. Catherine Osborne identifies Book I as being an important source of information on Pre-Socratic Philosophy. The most extensive treatment is given to the works of Pythagoras, Plato, and Aristotle. An outline of the philosophies of the Brahmins of India, Zamolxis of Thrace and the Celtic druids and also of the mythological poetry of Hesiod is given here.

Book IV details and seeks to refute the various beliefs and practices of various diviners and magicians, i.e., the Chaldeans, the Metoposcopists, the Magicians, and those who practice divination by astronomy. This book closed with a perceived explanation of the connection between the Gnostic heresies of Valentinus and Simon Magus and certain ideas ascribed to Pythagoras, thus linking discussion of Greek philosophy in Book I with later arguments against Gnosticism.

Book V concerns itself with the Ophite heresies. The author in particular identifies the Naassenes, the Peratae, the Sethians, and the beliefs of a heretic, Justinus. The Ophite error is identified as being rooted in the philosophy of the ancients. In Chapter 2 of this book, the author accuses the Naassenes of (a) believing that the pagan god Attis "has been emasculated, that is, he has passed over from the earthly parts of the nether world to the everlasting substance above, where...there is neither female nor male, but a new creature, a new man, which is hermaphrodite" [trans. J. H. McMahon]; and (b) of conflating Jesus and Attis based on the Gospel of Thomas and the Greek Gospel of the Egyptians.

In Book VI, the attack begun at the end of Book IV against Simon Magus and Valentinus resumes. The author sketches out their ideas, again affirming the source of their error to be the teaching of Pythagoras. The remainder of this book discusses the heresies of Valentinus' supposed followers.

Book VII challenges the teachings of such heretics as Basilides and his disciple Saturnilus, Marcion of Sinope, and Carpocrates of Alexandria, among others. These heresiarchs all held varying opinions on the God of the Old Testament, from Saturnilus, who are stated as believing that "the God of the Jews is one of the angels", directly opposed by Christ, to Carpocrates who asserted that the Father was for the most part aloof from physical creation, which had been formed by his angels.

A discussion of the heretical Docetae begins Book VIII. Who exactly the Docetae were is unclear, though the author seems to make a distinction between this group and others who considered Jesus to exist merely in appearance, the latter being the doctrine to which the term "Docetism" is now affixed. This heresy is associated with a misinterpretation of the Parable of the Sower of Matthew's Gospel and a belief that Christ's soul was separated from his body at his Crucifixion. The author proceeds to explain and argue against the Gnostics Monoimus, Tatian, and Hermogenes, before digressing from the Gnostic theme to refute the practices of the Quartodecimans. He likewise condemns the "Phrygians", i.e., the followers of Montanus and the Gnostic heresy of the Encratites.

Book IX begins with a refutation of the heresy of Noetus. This particular 'error' is said to implicate the now-canonised popes Zephyrinus and Callixtus I. This theme of conflict with the papacy is expanded upon in the second chapter of Book IX, which deals in particular with the errors of Pope Callixtus, whom is identified as a "sorcerer". The author then attacks the Elcesaites, who he says had a different baptismal practice than that of orthodox Christians. Book IX concludes with a summary of the "heresy" of the Jews, who are divided into Pharisees, Sadducees, and Essenes.

Book X concludes the work with a summary of what has written throughout.

== Legacy ==
The Refutation has been a significant source for contemporary scholars on various subjects since its discovery. The compendious breadth of the Refutation illuminates for the reader not only various Gnostic beliefs, but is also a source of "valuable information on the thinking of the Presocratics." The text is also an important source of Pythagorean and Neopythagorean teachings, which are frequently related to the heresies described therein.

== Bibliography ==
- Miroslav Marcovich, (ed.), Refutatio Omnium Haeresium, Berlin, Walter de Gruyter, 1986 (critical edition of the Greek text).
- Refutation of All Heresies, translated with an Introduction and notes by M. David Litwa, Atlanta, SBL Press, 2016.
- Réfutation de de toutes les hérésies, intr. and transl. by Hans van Kasteel, Grez-Doiceau, Beya, 2019.
