= Fiery flying serpent =

Biblical creature

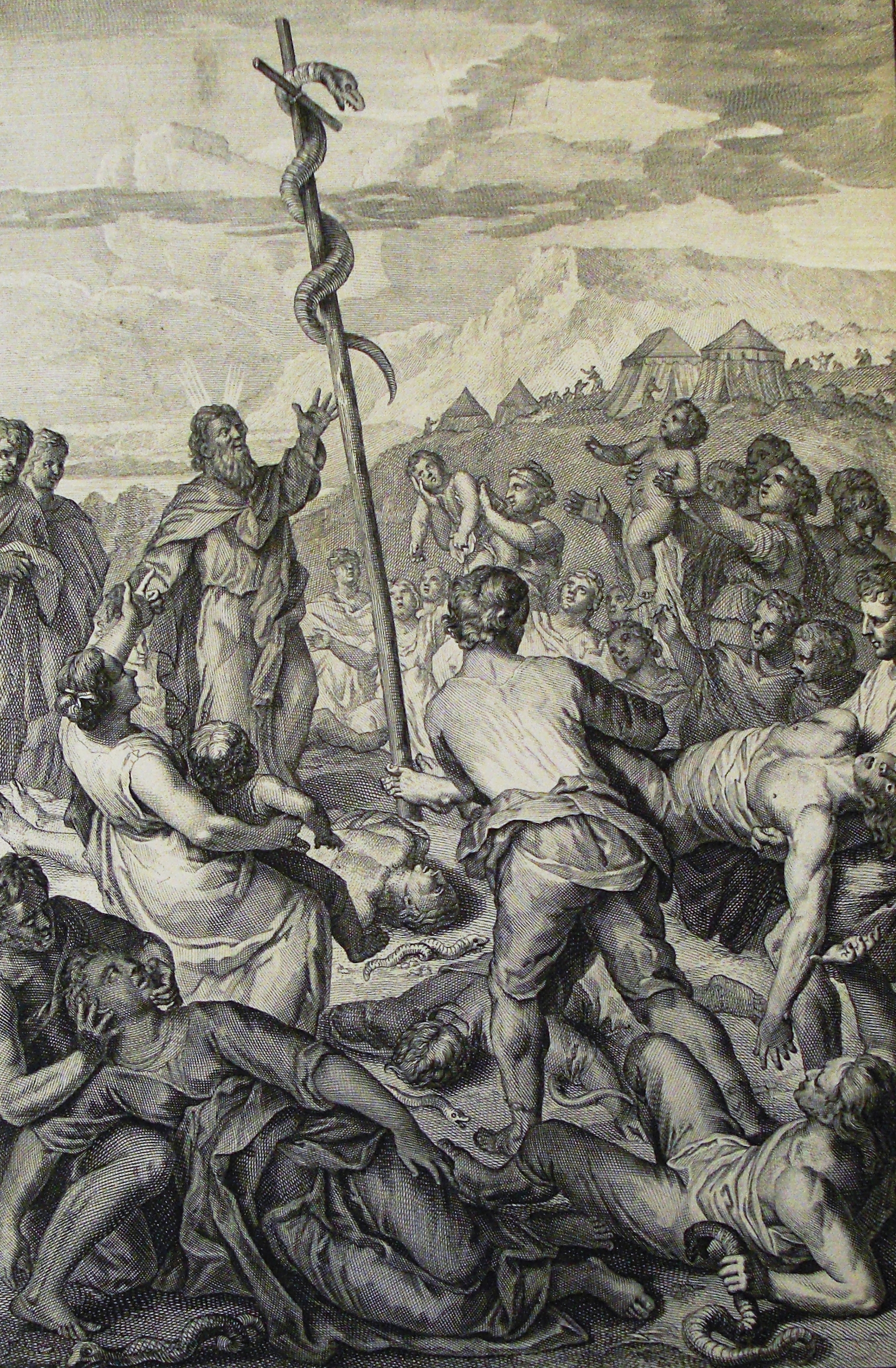
The Israelites bitten by fiery serpents (Book of Numbers chapter 21). A print from the Phillip Medhurst Collection of Bible illustrations

The fiery flying serpent (Hebrew: שָׂרָף מְעוֹפֵף sārāf mə‘ōfēf; Greek: ὄφεις πετόμενοι; Latin: draco volans) is a creature mentioned in the Book of Isaiah in the Tanakh.

The term translated as "fiery serpent", saraph, appears elsewhere in the Book of Isaiah to signify the seraphim, the singular form of which is also saraph. Etymologically, the origin for this word is likely derived from a root meaning "to burn", referencing the venomous bite of such creatures, before it became a standard noun. Parallels are mentioned outside of the Bible by an account involving the Assyrian king Esarhaddon in the 7th century BC, as "snake with deadly breath, and yellow flying serpents". As well as by Herodotus in the 5th century BC, where winged serpents were said to inhabit the areas of Arabia and Egypt.

== Biblical accounts ==
=== Book of Isaiah ===
- Isaiah 14:29: "Do not rejoice, all you of Philistia, because the rod that struck you is broken; for out of the serpent's roots will come a viper, and its offspring will be a fiery flying serpent."
- Isaiah 30:6: "The burden against the beasts of the South. Through a land of trouble and anguish, from which came the lioness and the lion, the viper and the fiery flying serpent, they will carry their riches on the backs of young donkeys, and their treasures on the humps of camels, to a people who shall not profit."

=== Other sources ===
References to "fiery serpents" lacking a mention of flight can be found in several places in the Hebrew Bible.

- Deuteronomy 8:15 "Who led thee through that great and terrible wilderness, wherein were fiery serpents, and scorpions, and drought, where there was no water; who brought thee forth water out of the rock of flint;"
- Numbers 21:6–8 "(6) And the LORD sent fiery serpents among the people, and they bit the people; and much people of Israel died. (7) Therefore the people came to Moses, and said, We have sinned, for we have spoken against the LORD, and against thee; pray unto the LORD, that he take away the serpents from us. And Moses prayed for the people. (8) And the LORD said unto Moses, Make thee a fiery serpent, and set it upon a pole: and it shall come to pass, that every one that is bitten, when he looketh upon it, shall live." This symbol, the Nehushtan, is similar to the ancient Greek Rod of Asklepios (frequently confused with the caduceus) and is frequently cited as an instance of the same archetype.

== Book of Mormon ==
In the Book of Mormon, they appear in 1 Nephi 17:41: "...he sent fiery flying serpents among them; and after they were bitten he prepared a way that they might be healed."

== Identification ==
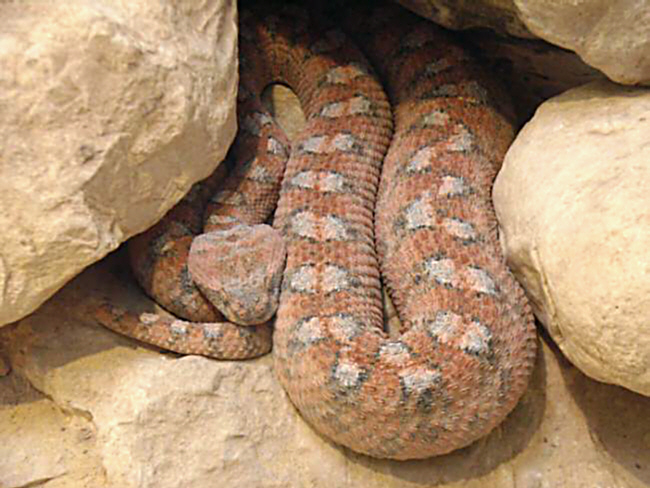
Echis coloratus (saw-scale viper)

Ancient Israelite seals often co-opted symbology from neighbouring ancient Egypt, and as such, archaeologists have discovered numerous seals which show a uraeus cobra with four wings in Syria-Palestine, and the use of the image appears consistently under King Hezekiah of Judah in the late 8th century BC. This, coupled with the fact that these cobras diverge from the typical Egyptian iconography, which depicted them with only two wings, have been connected by some to the "fiery flying serpents" mentioned in Isaiah, or even to the more specific seraphim seen elsewhere in the text. This identification, however, is not universally accepted.

In Egypt, spitting cobras were associated with fire, and Othmar Keel and Karl Uehlinger posit saraph may be a term for the black-necked cobra, that are also yellowish-copper in colour. The association with flying could then be related to the leaping of the snake as it strikes, and those that descend through the air to attack from trees. However, the species is indigenous to Sub-Saharan Africa, and the wilderness deserts do not have such trees in abundance making this connection tentative. While not being a specific type, the origin of the legend likely reflects local cobras in general that inhabit Egypt and the Levant (ie. Egyptian cobra, Arabian cobra, desert black snake).

Assuming the fiery flying serpent to have a biological identification, Ronald Millett and John Pratt identify it with the Israeli saw-scale viper or carpet viper (Echis coloratus) based on several clues from the written sources, such as that the serpents inhabit the Arava Valley, prefer rocky terrain, and are deadly venomous. A Roman account dated 22 AD about the deserts of Arabia indicates the presence of the saw-scale viper, reporting that "there are snakes also of a dark red color, a span in length, which spring up as high as a man's waist, and whose bite is incurable." Other candidates include desert horned viper (and close relatives), the desert black snake or black desert cobra, and the nematode Dracunculus medinensis.

A mention is also made by Cicero, he discusses a bird called an Ibis in which "it protects Egypt from plague, by killing and eating the flying serpents that are brought from the Libyan desert...".

== See also ==
- Chalkydri
- Dragon
- Feathered Serpent
- John 3
- Seraph
- Serpents in the Bible
- Wadjet
