= Naassenes =

Christian Gnostic sect

The Naassenes (Greek Naasseni, possibly from Hebrew נָחָשׁ naḥaš, snake) were a Christian Gnostic sect known only through the accounts in the books known as the Philosophumena or the Refutation of all Heresies (which have been attributed to Hippolytus of Rome but may in fact not be by him).

Therein, the Naassenes are said to have been taught their doctrines by Mariamne, a disciple of James the Just. The retention of the Hebrew form shows that their beliefs may represent the earliest stages of Gnosticism. The Philosophumena's author regards them as among the first to be called simply "Gnostics", alleging that they alone have sounded the depths of knowledge.

== Naassene Sermon ==
The Naassenes are said to have had one or more books containing discourses communicated by James, the brother of Jesus, to Mariamne: these treatises were of a mystical, philosophic, devotional, and exegetical character, rather than a cosmological exposition. A very interesting feature of the book seems to have been the specimens it gave of Ophite hymnology.

The writer (or writers) is possibly Greek. He does indeed use the Hebrew words Naas and Caulacau, but these words had already passed into the common Gnostic vocabulary so as to become known to many unacquainted with Hebrew. He shows a great knowledge of the religious mysteries of various nations.

=== First Man ===
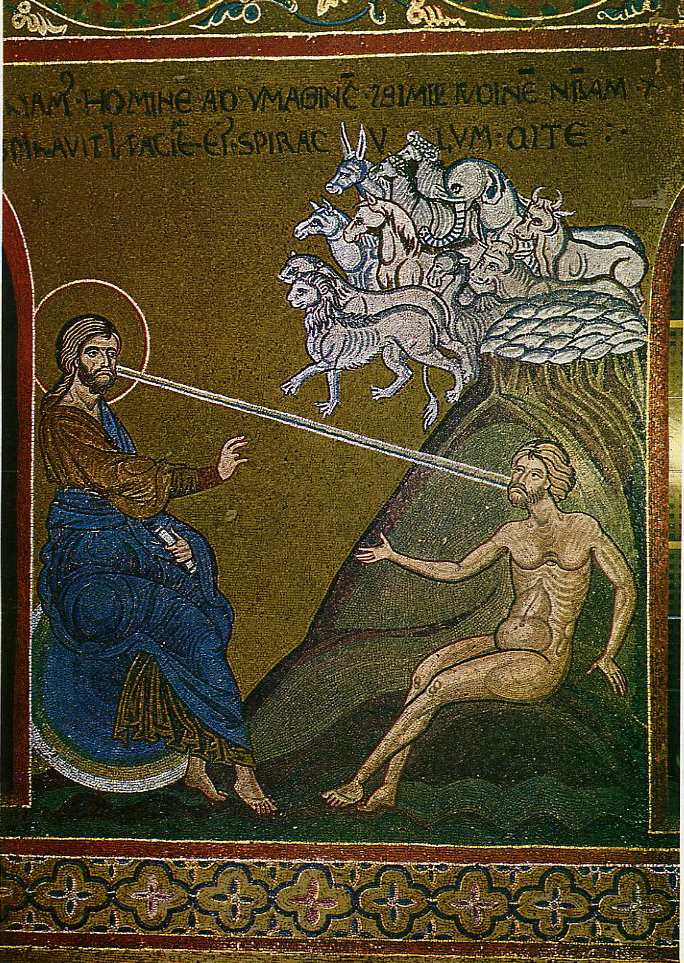
Creation of Adam, Byzantine mosaic in Monreale

The Naassenes so far agreed with other Ophites that they gave to the first principle the names First Man and Son of Man, calling him in their hymns Adamas:

- The First Man (Protanthropos, Adamas); the fundamental being before its differentiation into individuals (cf. Adam Kadmon).
- The Son of Man; the same being after it has been individualized into existing things and thus sunk into matter.

Instead, however, of retaining the female principle of the Syrian Ophites, they represented their "Man" as androgynous; and hence one of their hymns runs "From thee, father, through thee, mother, the two immortal names." They declared that "the beginning of Perfection is the gnosis of Man, but the gnosis of God is perfected Perfection."

Although the myths of the earlier Ophite system are but lightly touched on, there is some trace of an acquaintance with them, as for example the myth that Adam was brought forth by the Earth spontaneously; he lay without breath, without motion, without stirring, like a statue; being made after the image of the First Man, through the agency of several Archons. In order for them to seize hold of the First Man, there was given unto Adam a soul, that through this soul the image of the First Man above might suffer and be chastened in bondage.

The Naassenes taught that their primary man was, like Geryon, threefold, containing in himself the three natures to noeron, to psychikon, to choikon; and so that in Jesus the three natures were combined, and through him speak to these different classes of men. From the living waters which he supplies each absorbs that for which his nature has attraction. From the same water the olive can draw its oil, and the vine its wine, and in like manner each other plant its special produce: chaff will be attracted by amber, iron only by the magnet, gold only by the prickle of the sea-hawk, so each according to his nature attracts and imbibes a different supply from the same source.

=== Three classes ===
Thus there are three classes of men and three corresponding churches:

1. Material (the Bound)—the heathen chiefly captive under the dominion of matter.
2. Psychic (the Called)—ordinary Christians.
3. Spiritual (the Elect)—out of the many called, the few chosen members of the Naassene sect.

=== Creation ===
The Naassene work known to Hippolytus would seem to have been of what we may call a devotional character rather than a formal exposition of doctrine, and this perhaps is why it is difficult to draw from the accounts left us a thoroughly consistent scheme.

=== Generation ===
The Mysteries of the ancient world, it is taught, pertained to generation. The Lesser Mysteries pertained to the carnal, and the Greater dealt with the spiritual. Within the seed—sperma—is the Mystery of the Logos, as it is the original cause of all things that exist.

For the restoration of the chosen seed an essential condition is the complete abandonment of sexual intercourse between men and women. The captive people must pass out of Egypt; Egypt is the body, the Red Sea the work of generation; to cross the Red Sea and pass into the wilderness is to arrive at a state where that work of generation has been forsaken. Thus they arrive at the Jordan River. This is the Logos through whose streams rolling downward forms had descended from above, and generations of mortal men had taken place; but now Jesus, like his Old Testament namesake, rolls the stream upwards, and then takes place a generation not of men, but of gods, for to this name the new-born seed may lay claim (Psalms 82:6). But if they return to Egypt, that is to carnal intercourse, "they shall die like men." For that which is born from below is fleshly and mortal, that which is born from above is spiritual and immortal. This is the divine bliss—hidden, and yet revealed—of that which was, is, and will be—the kingdom of heaven to be sought for within.

The specimens already given present but a faint idea of the author's method of scripture exegesis. Hippolytus declares that the verses of Paul in Romans 1:27 contain the key to their whole system, which he alludes to with a great deal of innuendo:

And likewise also the men, leaving the natural use of the woman, burned in their lust one toward another; men with men working that which is unseemly, and receiving in themselves that recompence of their error which was meet.

This "unseemly" being their Mystery of divine bliss, he states; "that heavenly, sublime, felicity, that absence of all form which is the real source of every form." And baptism applied to none save the man who was introduced into this divine bliss, being washed with the Living Water, and "anointed with the Ineffable Chrism from the Horn, like David [was], not from the flask of clay, like Saul, who was fellowcitizen with an evil daemon of fleshly desire."

The Hermetic alchemists asserted that the Great Work was an opus contra naturam; Paul's use of "against nature" (παρὰ φύσιν, Romans 1:26) may have been given a similar allegorical meaning by the Naassene exegete. It is certainly possible that the Naassenes viewed homosexuality as exemplifying their concept of androgyny. Carl Jung remarked, "such a disposition should not be adjudged negative in all circumstances, in so far as it preserves the archetype of the Original Man, which a one-sided sexual being has, up to a point, lost." But as to evidence of any "unseemly" acts, Hippolytus writes that in every way, "they are not emasculated, and yet they act as though they were."

=== Exegesis ===
The writer, it will be seen, makes free use of the New Testament. He seems to have used all the four Gospels, but that of which he makes most use is St. John's. He quotes from Paul's epistles to the Romans, Corinthians (both letters), Galatians, and Ephesians. There is a copious use also of the Old Testament; and besides we are told there is a use of the Gospel according to the Egyptians, and that of Thomas. But what most characterizes the document under consideration is the abundant use of pagan writings. For the author's method of exegesis enables him to find his system in Homer with as much ease as in the Bible. Great part of the extract given by Hippolytus is a commentary on a hymn to the Phrygian Attis, all the epithets applied to whom are shown when etymologically examined, to be aspects of the Logos. One of the first of the titles applied to Attis is papas—here we are taught to recognise him who brought to rest (epause) all the disorderly motion that prevailed before his appearing. To him all things cry paue, paue, ten asymphonian.

=== The serpent ===
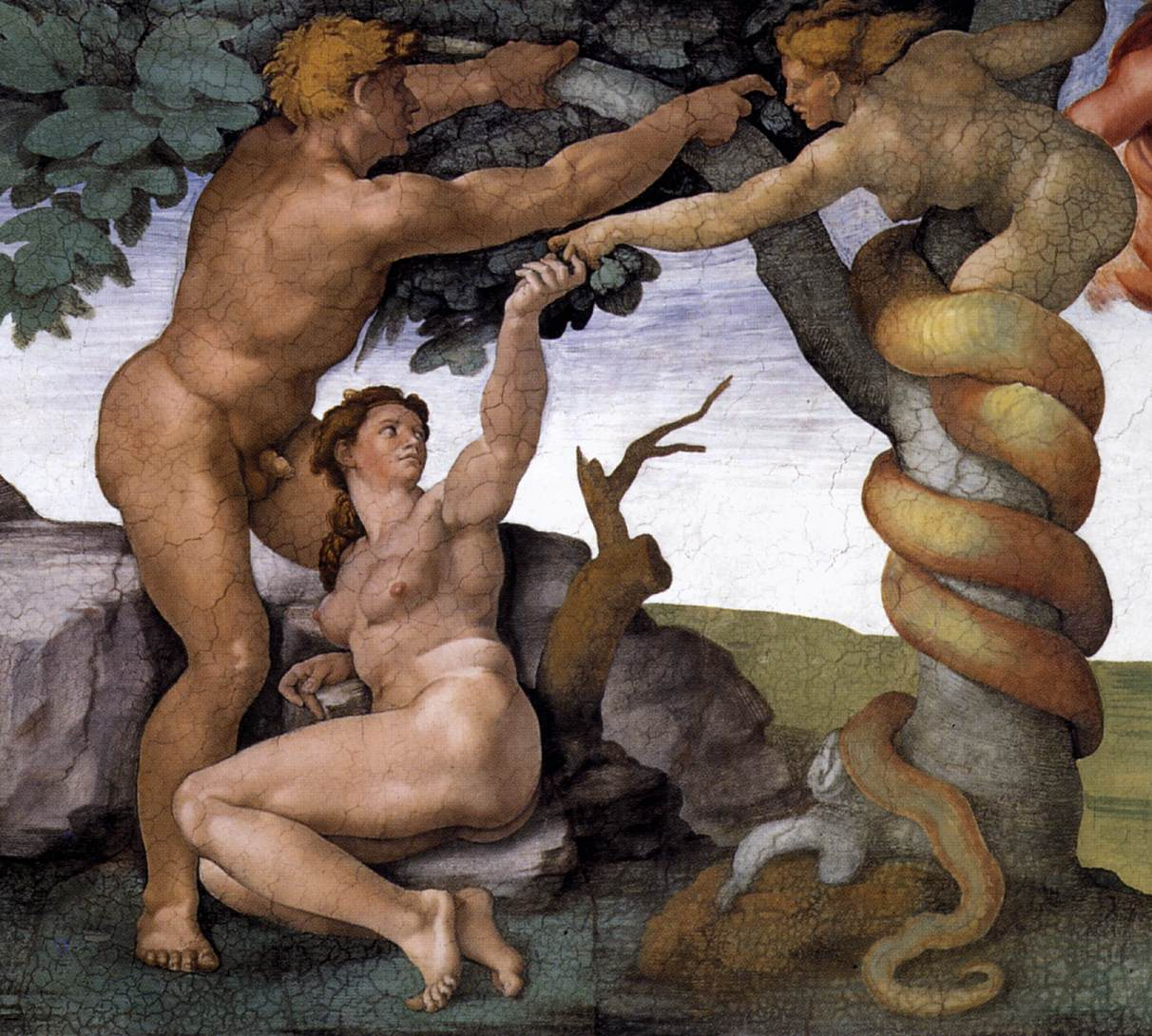
Adam and Eve with the Serpent, Michelangelo

Every temple, naos, shows by its title that it is intended for the honour of the serpent naas as "the Moist Essence," of the universe, without which "naught at all of existing things, immortal or mortal, animate or inanimate, can hold together." Furthermore, "all things are subject to Him, and He is Good, and has all things in Him ... so that He distributes beauty and bloom to all that exist according to each one's nature and peculiarity, as though permeating all."

G.R.S. Mead has suggested that all of this is in reference to the Kundalini:—

This is the cosmic Akāsha of the Upaniṣhads, and the Kuṇḍalinī, or serpentine force in man, which when following animal impulse is the force of generation, but when applied to spiritual things makes of a man a god. It is the Waters of Great Jordan flowing downwards (the generation of men) and upwards (the generation of gods); the Akāsha-gangā or Heavenly Ganges of the Purāṇas, the Heavenly Nile of mystic Egypt.

=== Eden ===
The Garden of Eden, in the Naassene system, is the brain, and Paradise the human head, with the four rivers having special significance:

- Pishon, "that is it which compasseth the whole land of Havilah, where there is gold; And the gold of that land is good: there is bdellium and the onyx stone."
  - Eyes (because of its dignity and colors that bear witness to what is said)
- Gihon, "the same is it that compasseth the whole land of Ethiopia."
  - Hearing (because of its being labyrinthine)
- Tigris, "that which flows the opposite way to the Assyrians."
  - Breathing (because "the current of it is very rapid; and it 'flows the opposite way to the Assyrians,' because after the breath is breathed out, on breathing in again, the breath that is drawn in from without, from the air, comes in more rapidly, and with greater force.")
- Euphrates
  - Mouth (because through prayer and food, a "man is rejoiced, and nourished and expressed.")

== Books ==
- A Naassene Fragment (quoted by Hippolytus as a summary of the entire Naassene system)
- The Gospel of Philip (evidently distinct from the Gospel of Philip of the Nag Hammadi Library)
- The Gospel of Thomas
- The Greek Gospel of the Egyptians

== See also ==
- Borborites
- Mandaeism
- Nehushtan
- Perates
- Sethianism
- Snake worship
- The Worship of the Serpent

== Bibliography ==
- King, Charles William (1887). "Ophites". The Gnostics and Their Remains.
- Mead, G.R.S (1900). "Naasseni". Fragments of a Faith Forgotten.
- Mead, G.R.S (1906). "The Myth of Man in the Mysteries". Thrice Great Hermes: Studies in Hellenistic Theosophy and Gnosis, Volume I.
- Hippolytus, Philosophumena, Book V: Naasseni
