= Serpents in the Bible =

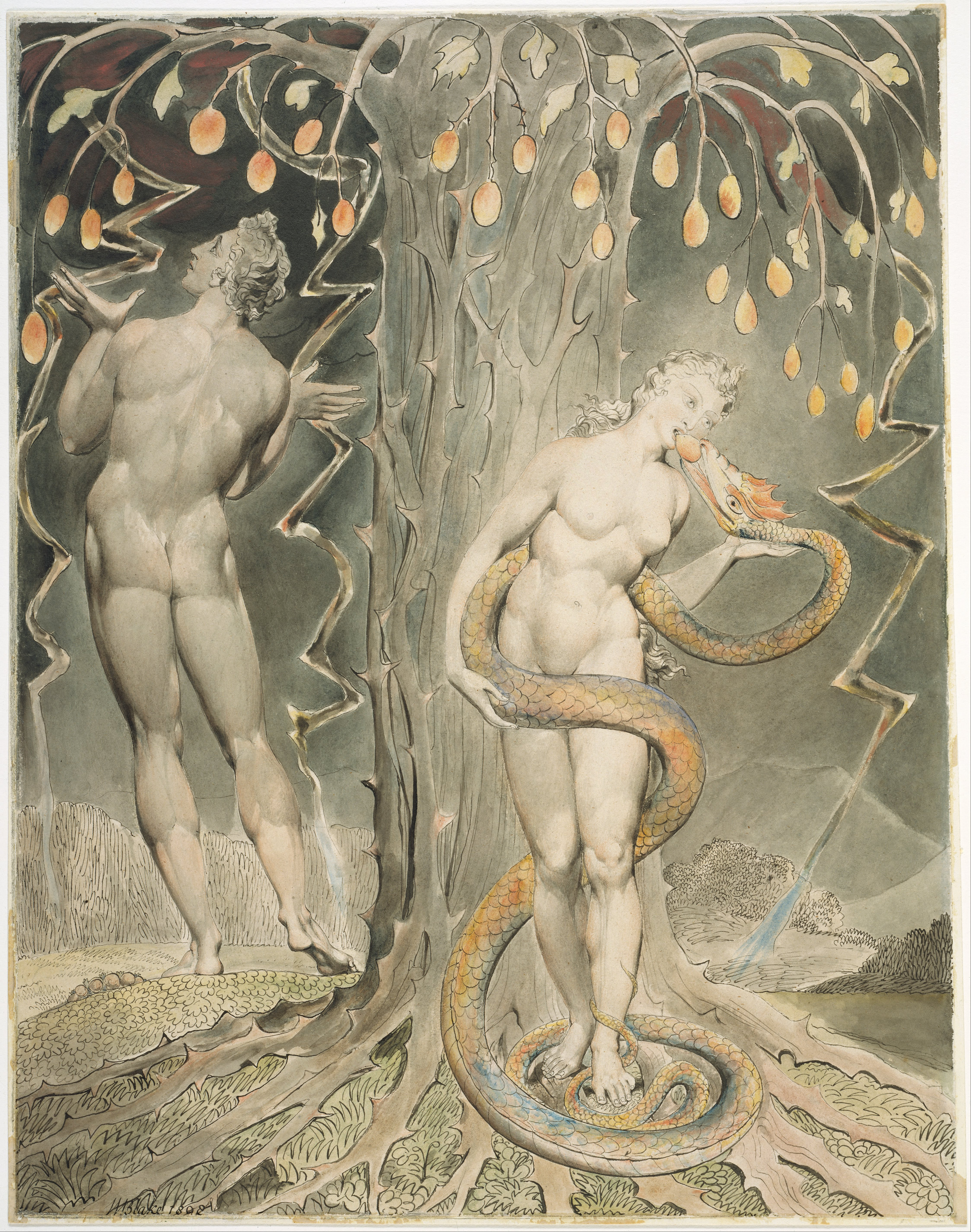
William Blake, The Temptation and Fall of Eve, 1808 (illustration of John Milton's Paradise Lost).

Serpents (Hebrew: נָחָשׁ, romanized: nāḥāš) are referred to in both the Hebrew Bible and the New Testament. The symbol of a serpent or snake played important roles in the religious traditions and cultural life of ancient Greece, Egypt, Mesopotamia, and Canaan. The serpent was a symbol of evil power and chaos from the underworld as well as a symbol of fertility, life, healing, and rebirth.

Nāḥāš (נחש), Hebrew for "snake", is also associated with divination, including the verb form meaning "to practice divination or fortune-telling". Nāḥāš occurs in the Torah to identify the serpent in the Garden of Eden. Throughout the Hebrew Bible, it is also used in conjunction with seraph to describe vicious serpents in the wilderness. The tannin, a dragon monster, also occurs throughout the Hebrew Bible. In the Book of Exodus, the staves of Moses and Aaron are turned into serpents, a nāḥāš for Moses, a tannin for Aaron. In the New Testament, the Book of Revelation uses the phrases "ancient serpent" and "the Dragon" to identify Satan or the Devil (Revelation 12:9; 20:2). In later Jewish, Christian, and Islamic interpretation, the serpent of Eden has been variously identified with Satan, the Devil, or Lilith, although the Book of Genesis itself does not name the serpent as Satan or the Devil.

The narrative of the Garden of Eden and the fall of humankind constitute a mythological tradition shared by all the Abrahamic religions, with a presentation more or less symbolic of Abrahamic morals and religious beliefs, which had an overwhelming impact on human sexuality, gender roles, and sex differences both in the Western and Islamic civilizations. In mainstream (Nicene) Christianity, the doctrine of the Fall is closely related to that of original sin or ancestral sin. Unlike Christianity, the other major Abrahamic religions, Judaism and Islam, do not have a concept of "original sin", and instead have developed varying other interpretations of the Eden narrative.

== Hebrew Bible ==
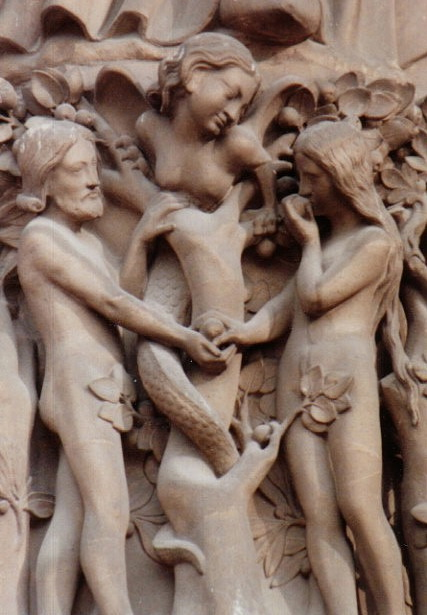
Adam, Eve, and a female serpent at the entrance to Notre Dame Cathedral in Paris, France. The portrayal of the image of the serpent as a mirror of Eve was common in earlier Christian iconography as a result of the identification of women as the ones responsible for the fall of man and source of the original sin.

In the Hebrew Bible, the Book of Genesis refers to a serpent who triggered the expulsion of Adam and Eve from the Garden of Eden (Gen 3:1–20). Serpent is also used to describe sea monsters. Examples of these identifications are in the Book of Isaiah where a reference is made to a serpent-like dragon named Leviathan (Isaiah 27:1), and in the Book of Amos where a serpent resides at the bottom of the sea (Amos 9:3). Serpent figuratively describes biblical places such as Egypt (Jer 46:22), and the city of Dan (Gen 49:17). The prophet Jeremiah also compares the King of Babylon to a serpent (Jer 51:34).

=== Eden ===
The Hebrew word nāḥāš is used in the Hebrew Bible to identify the serpent that appears in Genesis 3 in the Garden of Eden. Here, the serpent is portrayed as a deceptive creature or trickster, who promotes as good what God had forbidden and shows particular cunning in its deception. (cf. Genesis 3:4–5 and 3:22) The serpent has the ability to speak and to reason: "Now the serpent was more subtle (also translated as "cunning") than any beast of the field which the Lord God had made". There is no indication in the Book of Genesis that the serpent was a deity in its own right, although it is one of only two cases in the Torah of animals that talk, the other being Balaam's donkey.

God placed Adam in the Garden of Eden to tend it and warned Adam not to eat the fruit of the tree of the knowledge of good and evil in the Genesis creation narrative: Genesis 2:17, "as for the tree of knowledge of good and bad, you must not eat of it; for as soon as you eat of it, you shall die." The serpent then tempts Eve to eat of the tree in Genesis 3, but Eve tells the serpent what God had said.The serpent replies that she would not surely die (Genesis 3:4) and that if she eats the fruit of the tree "then your eyes shall be opened, and ye shall be as gods, knowing good and evil." (Genesis 3:5) Eve eats the fruit, and gives some to Adam who also eats. God, who was walking in the Garden, learns of their transgression. To prevent Adam and Eve from eating the fruit of the Tree of Life and living forever, they are banished from the garden upon which God posts an angelic guard. The serpent is punished for its role in the fall of humanity, cursed by God to crawl on its belly and eat dust.

There is a debate about whether the serpent in Eden should be viewed figuratively or as a literal animal. According to one midrashic interpretation in Rabbinic literature, the serpent represents sexual desire; another interpretation is that the snake is the yetzer hara. Modern Rabbinic ideas include interpreting the story as a psychological allegory where Adam represents reasoning faculties, Eve the emotional faculties, and the serpent the hedonic sexual/physical faculties. Voltaire, drawing on Socinian influences, wrote: "It was so decidedly a real serpent, that all its species, which had before walked on their feet, were condemned to crawl on their bellies. No serpent, no animal of any kind, is called Satan, or Belzebub, or Devil, in the Pentateuch." The Book of Genesis itself does not identify the serpent as Satan or the Devil; that identification developed in later interpretation, especially in Christian readings influenced by the Book of Revelation.

20th-century scholars such as W. O. E. Oesterley (1921) were cognizant of the differences between the role of the Edenic serpent in the Hebrew Bible and its connections with the "ancient serpent" in the New Testament. Modern historiographers of Satan such as Henry Ansgar Kelly (2006) and Wray and Mobley (2007) speak of the "evolution of Satan", or "development of Satan".

According to Gerhard von Rad, Biblical scholar, Lutheran theologian and University of Heidelberg professor, who applied form criticism as a supplement to the documentary hypothesis of the Hebrew Bible, the snake in the Eden's narrative was more an expedient to represent the impulse to temptation of mankind (that is, disobeying God's law) rather than an evil spirit or the personification of the Devil, as the later Christian literature erroneously depicted it; moreover, von Rad himself states that the snake is neither a supernatural being nor a demon, but one of the wild animals created by God (Genesis 3:1), and the only thing that differentiates it from the others in Eden is the ability to speak:

The serpent which now enters the narrative is marked as one of God's created animals (ch. 2.19). In the narrator's mind, therefore, it is not the symbol of a "demonic" power and certainly not of Satan. What distinguishes it a little from the rest of the animals is exclusively his greater cleverness. [...] The mention of the snake here is almost incidental; at any rate, in the "temptation" by it the concern is with a completely unmythical process, presented in such a way because the narrator is obviously anxious to shift the responsibility as little as possible from man. It is a question only of man and his guilt; therefore the narrator has carefully guarded against objectifying evil in any way, and therefore he has personified it as little as possible as a power coming from without. That he transferred the impulse to temptation outside man was almost more a necessity for the story than an attempt at making evil something existing outside man. [...] In the history of religions the snake indeed is the sinister, strange animal par excellence [...], and one can also assume that long before, a myth was once at the basis of our narrative. But as it lies now before us, transparent and lucid, it is anything but a myth.

Michael Heiser argues that since ancient Hebrew was originally written without vowels, the consonantal root נ-ח-ש (N-H-Sh) is polysemous, allowing the term used in Eden to be read as a serpentine celestial being rather than a biological reptile. Within ancient Northwest Semitic languages, the root encompasses three overlapping semantic meanings: a physical snake or serpent, historically linked to a snake's hissing sound, a verb meaning "to practice divination" or "whisper omens", and a root related to polished bronze or copper, rendering a translation of "shining, radiant one" associated with divine manifestations. Drawing on this etymology, the International Standard Version (ISV Foundation) renders the term in Genesis 3:1 as "the Shining One", with "the diviner" and "the serpent" as alternative textual readings. The ISV notes the term "connotes an entity who falsely claims to reveal God's word". Under this framework, the figure is often interpreted as a serpentine throne-guardian and renegade Seraph (שָׂרָף). These are a class of angelic beings whose name denotes "burning ones", and used interchangeably with "fiery serpents" elsewhere in the Hebrew Bible. Furthermore, Heiser posits that the Hebrew preposition mi-kol used in Genesis 3:1, acts as a comparative rather than inclusive marker; indicating it possessed a "shrewdness" that categorized it as distinct from the beasts of the field.

This alternative celestial context changes the interpretation of the subsequent judgment in Genesis 3:14. The statement that the serpent will "crawl on your belly" has been compared to Egyptian Pyramid Texts, which calls snakes to lie down, fall down, or crawl away in a docile, defeated posture rather than an upright attack position. Similarly, the command to "eat dust" finds parallels with common ancient Near Eastern idioms found in the Epic of Gilgamesh and the Descent of Ishtar, where the underworld is explicitly described as a "house of dust" where spirits consume clay and dirt. Thus, the curse is argued to read as an ancient legal idiom for being cast into the underworld.

=== Moses and Aaron ===
When God had revealed himself to the prophet Moses in Exodus 3:4–22, Moses recognized that the call of God was for him to lead the people of Israel out of slavery, but anticipated that people would deny or doubt his calling. In Exodus 4:1–5, Moses asked God how to respond to such doubt, and God asked him to cast the rod which he carried (possibly a shepherd's crook) onto the ground, whereupon it became a serpent (a nachash). Moses fled from it, but God encouraged him to come back and take it by the tail, and it became a rod again.

Later in the Book of Exodus (Exodus 7), the staffs of Moses and Aaron were turned into serpents, a nachash for Moses, a tanniyn for Aaron.

=== Fiery serpents ===
"Fiery serpent" (Hebrew: שָׂרָף, romanized: śārāp, lit. 'burning') occurs in the Torah to describe a species of vicious snakes whose venom burns upon contact. According to Wilhelm Gesenius, saraph corresponds to the Sanskrit sarpa 'venomous snake', serpent; sarpin, reptile (from the root srip, serpere). These "burning serpents" infested the great and terrible place of the desert wilderness (Numbers 21:4-9; Deuteronomy 8:15). The Hebrew word for "poisonous" literally means "fiery", "flaming" or "burning", as the burning sensation of a snake bite on human skin, a metaphor for the fiery anger of God (Numbers 11:1).

The Book of Isaiah expounds on the description of these fiery serpents as "flying saraphs" (according to YLT) or "flying dragons", in the land of trouble and anguish (Isaiah 30:6). Isaiah indicates that these saraphs are comparable to vipers, worse than ordinary serpents (Isaiah 14:29). The prophet Isaiah also sees a vision of seraphim in the First Temple: but these are divine agents, with wings and human faces, and are probably not to be interpreted as serpent-like so much as "flame-like".

=== Serpent of bronze ===
In the Book of Numbers, while Moses was in the wilderness, he mounted a serpent of bronze on a pole that functioned as a cure against the bite of the śərāpîm in Numbers 21:4–9. The phrase in Numbers 21:9, Biblical Hebrew: נְחַ֣שׁ נְחֹ֔שֶׁת, romanized: nəḥaš nəḥōšet, lit. 'a serpent of bronze', is a wordplay.

Mainstream scholars suggest that the image of the fiery serpent served to function like that of a magical amulet. Magic amulets or charms were used in the ancient Near East to practice a healing ritual known as sympathetic magic in an attempt to ward off, heal or reduce the impact of illness and poisons. Copper and bronze serpent figures have been recovered, showing that the practice was widespread. It has also been proposed that the bronze serpent was a type of intermediary between God and the people that served as a test of obedience, in the form of free judgment, standing between the dead who were not willing to look to God's chosen instrument of healing, and the living who were willing and were healed. Thus, this instrument bore witness to the sovereign power of Yahweh even over the dangerous and sinister character of the desert.

In 2 Kings 18:4, a bronze serpent, alleged to be the one Moses made, was kept in the First Temple. sanctuary. The Israelites began to worship the object as an idol or image of God, offering sacrifices and burning incense to it, until Hezekiah was crowned. Hezekiah referred to it as Nehushtan and had torn it down. Scholars have debated the nature of the relationship between the Mosaic bronze serpent and Hezekiah's Nehushtan, but traditions happen to link the two.

== New Testament ==
=== Gospels ===
In the Gospel of Matthew, John the Baptist calls the Pharisees and Saducees, who were visiting him, a "brood of vipers" (γεννηματα εχιδνων, Matthew 3:7). Jesus also uses this imagery, observing: "You snakes! You brood of vipers! How will you escape being condemned to hell?" (Matthew 23:33). Alternatively, Jesus also presents the snake with a less negative connotation when sending out the Twelve Apostles. Jesus exhorted them, "I am sending you out like sheep into the midst of wolves, so be wise as serpents and innocent as doves." (Matthew 10:16). Wilhelm Gesenius notes that even amongst the ancient Hebrews, the serpent was a symbol of wisdom.

In the Gospel of John, Jesus made mention of the serpent when he foretold his crucifixion to a Jewish teacher. In John 3:14–15, Jesus says, "And just as Moses lifted up the serpent in the wilderness, so must the Son of Man be lifted up, 15 that whoever believes in him may have eternal life.".

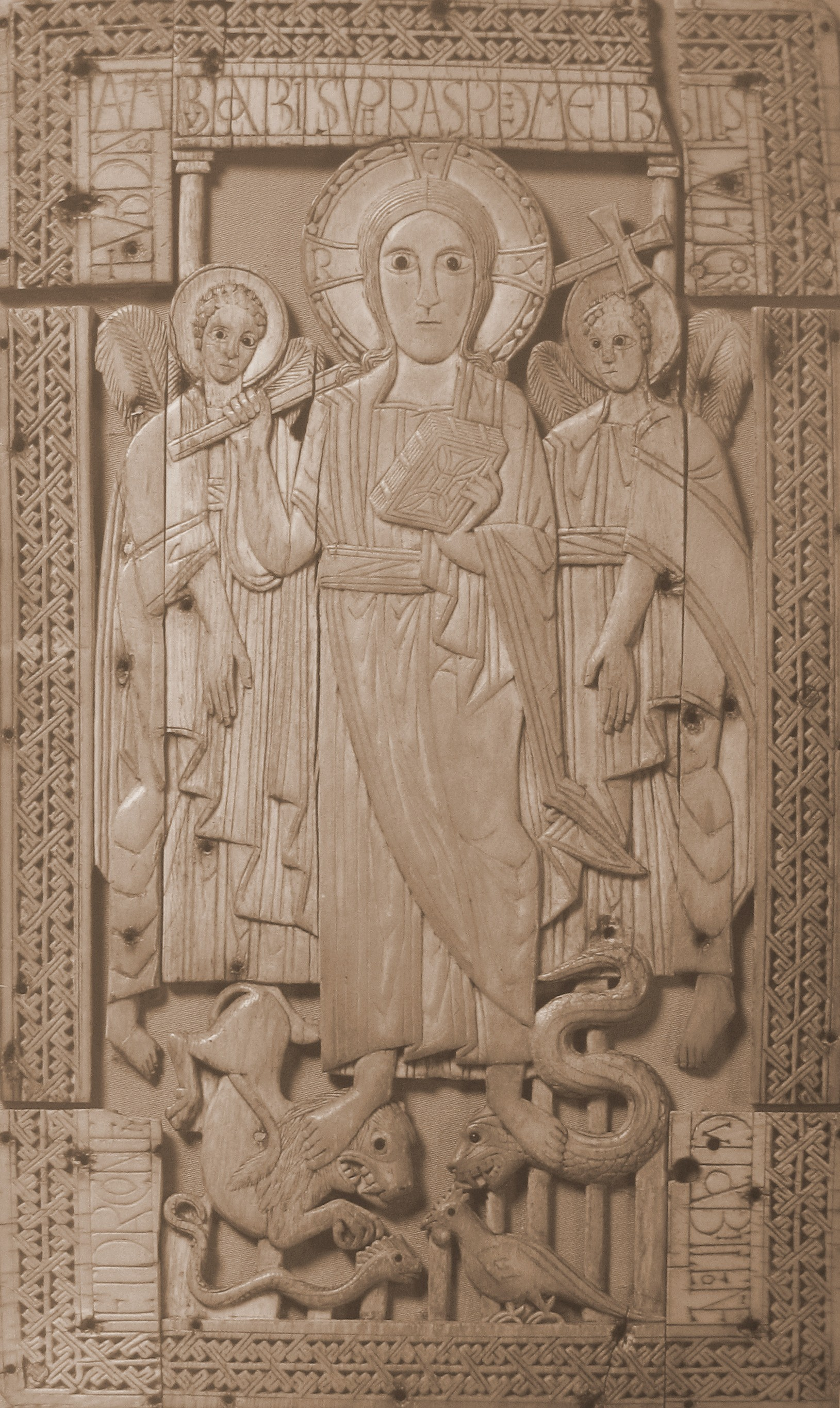
Ivory of Christ treading on the beasts from the Ivories of Genoels-Elderen, with four beasts; the basilisk was sometimes depicted as a bird with a long smooth tail.

=== Temptation of Christ ===
In the temptation of Christ, the Devil cites Psalm 91:11–12, "for it is written, He shall give his angels charge concerning thee: and in [their] hands they shall bear thee up, lest at any time thou dash thy foot against a stone." He cuts off before verse 13, "Thou shalt tread upon the lion and adder: the young lion and the dragon (tanniyn) shalt thou trample under feet."

The serpent in Psalm 91:13 is identified as Satan by Christians: "super aspidem et basiliscum calcabis conculcabis leonem et draconem" in the Latin Vulgate, literally "The asp and the basilisk you will trample under foot; you will tread on the lion and the dragon". This passage is commonly interpreted by Christians as a reference to Christ defeating and triumphing over Satan. The passage led to the Late Antique and Early Medieval iconography of Christ treading on the beasts, in which two beasts are often shown, usually the lion and snake or dragon, and sometimes four, which are normally the lion, dragon, asp (snake) and basilisk (which was depicted with varying characteristics) of the Vulgate. All represented the devil, as explained by Cassiodorus and Bede in their commentaries on Psalm 91. The serpent is often shown curled round the foot of the cross in depictions of the crucifixion of Jesus from Carolingian art until about the 13th century; often it is shown as dead. The crucifixion was regarded as the fulfillment of God's curse on the serpent in Genesis 3:15. Sometimes it is pierced by the cross and in one ivory is biting Christ's heel, as in the curse.

=== Ancient serpent ===
Serpent (Greek: ὄφις; Trans: Ophis, /ˈo.fis/; "snake", "serpent") occurs in the Book of Revelation as the "ancient serpent" or "old serpent"^{(YLT)} used to describe "the dragon",^{[20:2]} Satan the Adversary,^{(YLT)} who is the devil.^{[12:9, 20:2]} This serpent is depicted as a red seven-headed dragon having ten horns, each housed with a diadem. The serpent battles Michael the Archangel in a War in Heaven which results in this devil being cast out to the earth. While on earth, he pursues the Woman of the Apocalypse and gives power and authority to the Beast. Unable to obtain her, he wages war with the rest of her seed (Revelation 12:1–18). He who has the key to the abyss and a great chain over his hand, binds the serpent for a thousand years. The serpent is then cast into the abyss and sealed within until he is released (Revelation 20:1–3).

In Christian tradition, the "ancient serpent" of Revelation 12:9 and 20:2 is commonly identified with the serpent of Genesis and with Satan or the Devil. This identification is not explicit in Genesis itself, where the serpent is not named as Satan or the Devil, but became important in later Christian interpretation of the Eden narrative.

== Religious views ==
=== Biblical apocrypha and deuterocanonical books ===
The first deuterocanonical source to connect the serpent with the devil may be the Book of Wisdom. The subject is more developed in the pseudepigraphal Life of Adam and Eve, where the devil works with the serpent.

=== Christianity ===
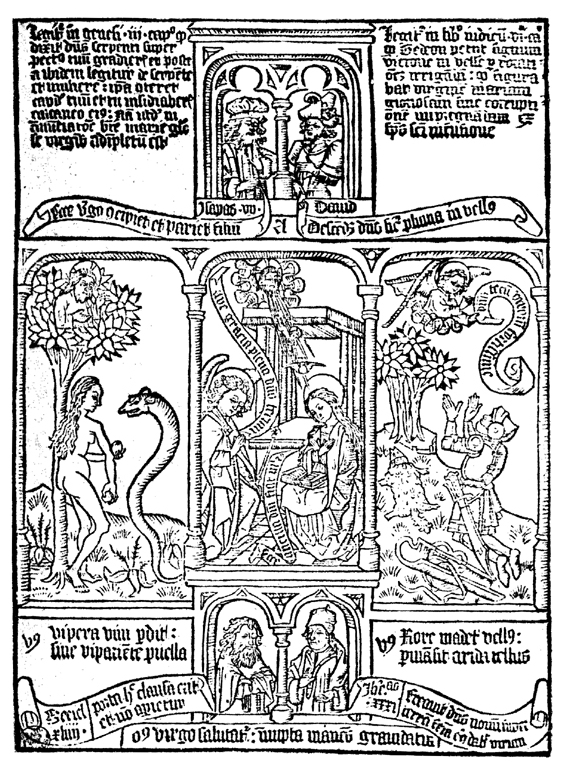
Medieval illustration of Eve and the serpent in the Garden of Eden. Folio from the Biblia pauperum, 14th–15th century.

Following the imagery of chapter 12 of the Book of Revelation, Bernard of Clairvaux had called Mary the "conqueror of dragons", and she was long to be shown crushing a snake underfoot, also a reference to her title as the "New Eve".

=== Gnosticism ===
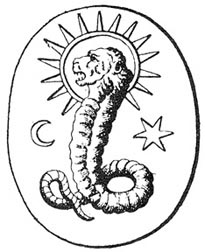
A lion-faced, serpentine deity found on a Gnostic gem in Bernard de Montfaucon's L'antiquité expliquée et représentée en figures, a depiction of Yaldabaoth.

Gnosticism originated in the late 1st century in non-rabbinical Jewish and early Christian sects. In the formation of Christianity, various sectarian groups, labeled "gnostics" by their opponents, emphasised spiritual knowledge (gnosis) of the divine spark within, over faith (pistis) in the teachings and traditions of the various communities of Christians. Gnosticism presents a distinction between the highest, unknowable God, and the Demiurge, "creator" of the material universe. The Gnostics considered the most essential part of the process of salvation to be this personal knowledge, in contrast to faith as an outlook in their worldview along with faith in the ecclesiastical authority.

In Gnosticism, the biblical serpent in the Garden of Eden was praised and thanked for bringing knowledge (gnosis) to Adam and Eve and thereby freeing them from the malevolent Demiurge's control. Gnostic Christian doctrines rely on a dualistic cosmology that implies the eternal conflict between good and evil, and a conception of the serpent as the liberating savior and bestower of knowledge to humankind opposed to the Demiurge or creator god, identified with the [Hebrew God of the Old Testament. Gnostic Christians considered the Hebrew God of the Old Testament as the evil, false god and creator of the material universe, and the Unknown God of the Gospel, the father of Jesus Christ and creator of the spiritual world, as the true, good God. In the Archontic, Sethian, and Ophite systems, Yaldabaoth (Yahweh) is regarded as the malevolent Demiurge and false god of the Old Testament who generated the material universe and keeps the souls trapped in physical bodies, imprisoned in the world full of pain and suffering that he created.

However, not all Gnostic movements regarded the creator of the material universe as inherently evil or malevolent. For instance, Valentinians believed that the Demiurge is merely an ignorant and incompetent creator, trying to fashion the world as good as he can, but lacking the proper power to maintain its goodness. All Gnostics were regarded as heretics by the proto-orthodox Early Church Fathers.

== See also ==
- Aaron's rod
- Caduceus – Staff of Mercury and staff of Hermes
- Caduceus as a symbol of medicine
- Chinese dragon
- Church of God with Signs Following
- Dragons in Greek mythology
- Ethnoherpetology
- Lucifer
- Naassenes
- Nāga
- Narayana
- Ningishzida
- Ophites
- Protoevangelium
- Rod of Asclepius
- Serpent seed
- Snake worship
- Staff of Moses
- Yaldabaoth
