= Ophites =

Christian Gnostic sect

The Ophites, also called Ophians (Greek Ὀφιανοί Ophianoi, from ὄφις ophis "snake"), were a Christian Gnostic sect depicted by Hippolytus of Rome (170–235) in a lost work, the Syntagma ("arrangement").

It is now thought that later accounts of the Ophites by Pseudo-Tertullian, Philastrius and Epiphanius of Salamis are all dependent on the lost Syntagma of Hippolytus. It is possible that, rather than an actual sectarian name, Hippolytus may have invented "Ophite" as a generic term for what he considered heretical speculations concerning the serpent of Genesis or Moses.

Apart from the sources directly dependent on Hippolytus (Pseudo-Tertullian, Philastrius and Epiphanius), Origen and Clement of Alexandria also mention the group. The group is directly mentioned by Irenaeus in Adversus Haereses (1.30).

== Pseudo-Tertullian ==
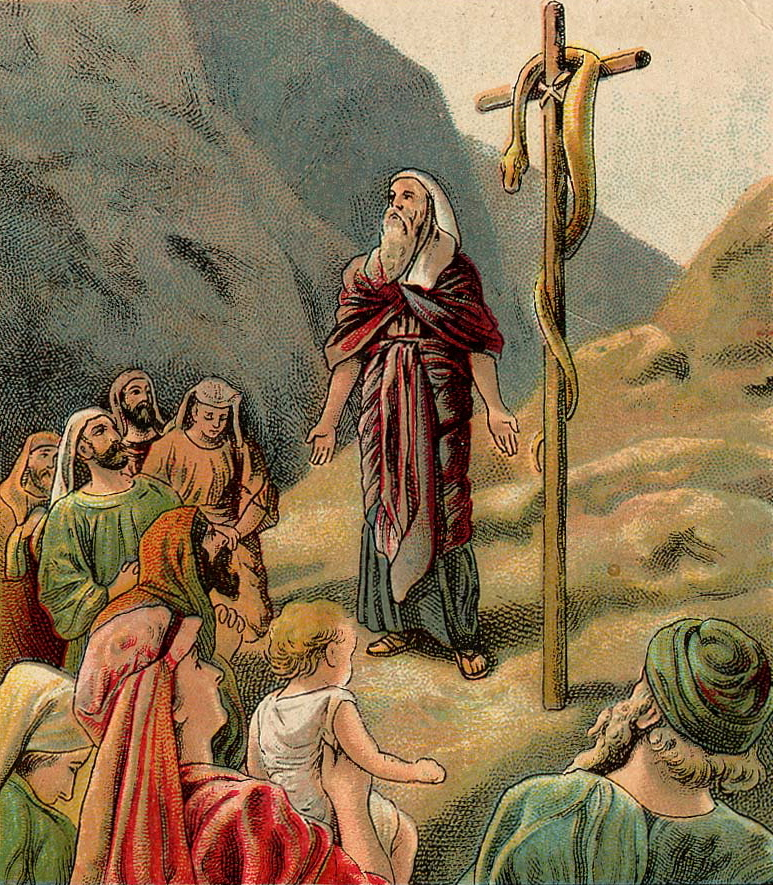
The Brazen Serpent (illustration from a Bible card published 1907 by Providence Lithograph Company)

Pseudo-Tertullian (probably the Latin translation of the lost Syntagma, written c. 220) is the earliest source to mention Ophites, and the first source to discuss the connection with serpents. He claims that the Ophites taught that

Christ did not exist in the flesh (Christum autem non in substantia carnis fuisse; 2.4); that they extolled the serpent and preferred it to Christ (serpentem magnificant in tantum, ut ilium etiam ipsi Christo praeferant; 2.1); and that Christ imitated (imitor) Moses' serpent's sacred power (Num 21:6-9) saying, "And just as Moses lifted up the serpent in the wilderness, so must the Son of Man be lifted up (John 3:14)" (Haer. 2:1). In addition, Eve is said to have believed the serpent, as if it had been God the Son (Eua quasi filio deo crediredat; 2.4).

The name "Jesus" is not mentioned in the account. Epiphanius's account differs from that of Pseudo-Tertullian only in a few places. According to the former, the Ophites did not actually prefer the snake to Christ, but thought them identical.

== Hippolytus ==
=== Syntagma ===
This lost earlier treatise of Hippolytus appears to have contained a section on the Ophites, following that on the Nicolaitans, with whom they were brought into connection. Philaster has mistakenly transposed this and two other sections, beginning his treatise on heresies with the Ophites, and making the Ophites, Cainites, and Sethians pre-Christian sects. The section of Hippolytus appears to have given a condensed account of the mythological story told by Irenaeus. In giving the name Ophite, however, he appears to have brought into greater prominence than Irenaeus the characteristics of the sect indicated by the word, their honour of the serpent, whom they even preferred to Christ, their venerating him because he taught our first parents the knowledge of good and evil, their use of the references to the brazen serpent in the Old and New Testament, and their introduction of the serpent into their Eucharistic celebration.

=== Philosophumena ===
The great difference between the earlier and the later treatise of Hippolytus is that the former was a mere compilation, his account of the opinions of heresies being in the main derived from the lectures of Irenaeus; but at the time of writing the latter, he had himself read several heretical writings, of which he gives an extract in his treatise. In this book he makes a contemptuous mention of the Ophites in company with the Cainites and Nochaitae as heretics whose doctrines did not deserve the compliment of serious exposition or refutation.

And it is strange that he does not seem to suspect that these heretics have any connection with those who form the subject of his fifth book. In that book he treats of sects which paid honour to the serpent, giving to the first of these sects the name Naassenes, a title which he knows is derived from the Hebrew word for serpent ("Nahash"-נחש). Possibly Hippolytus restricted the name Ophites to the sect described by Irenaeus, which has very little in common with that which he calls Naassenes. This book contains sections on several other Ophite systems, that of the Peratae, Sethians and of Justinus.

== Irenaeus ==
=== Against Heresies ===
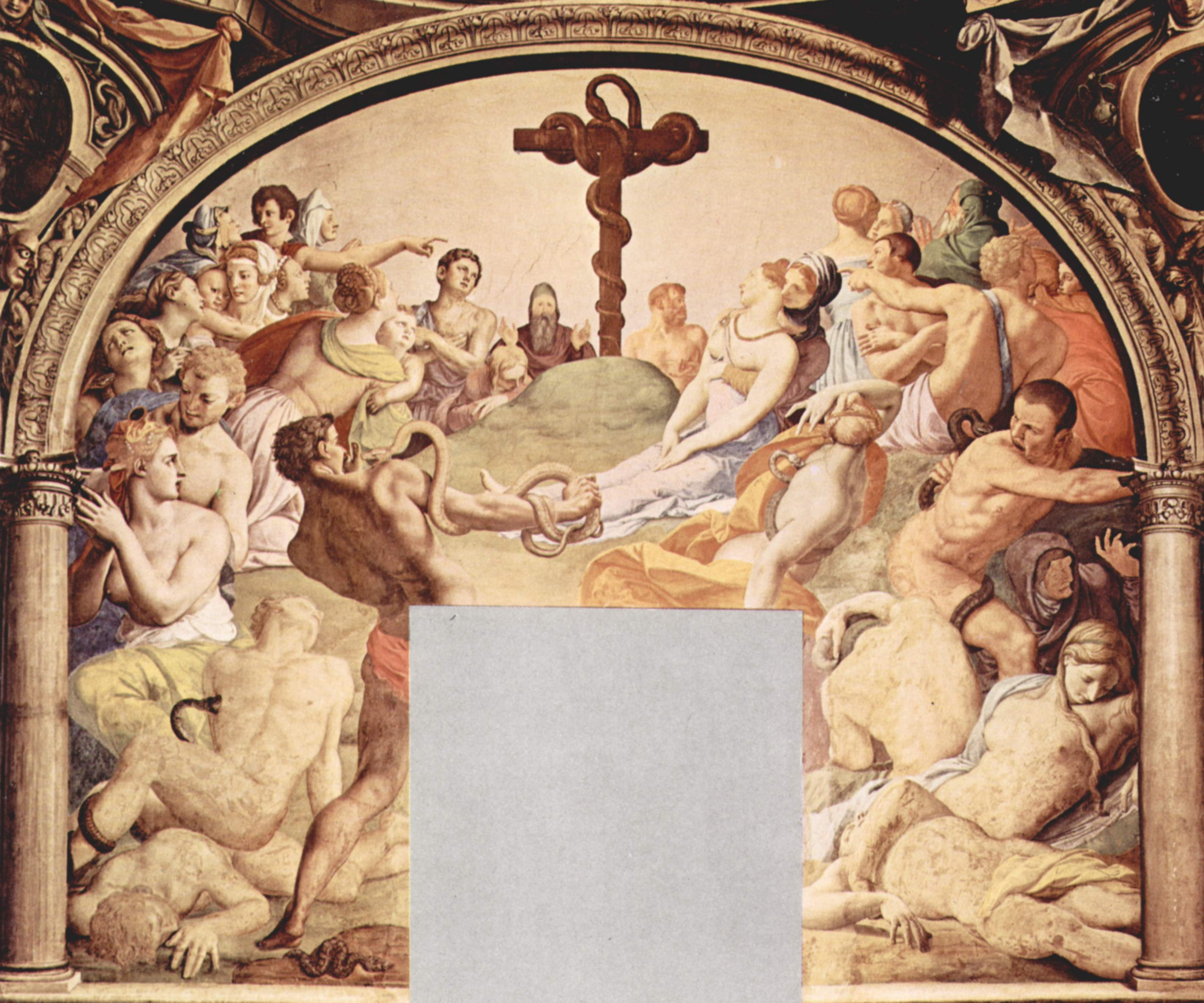
Agnolo Bronzino, Il serpente di bronzo, from the chapel of Eleonora of Toledo, Florence, Palazzo Vecchio

Irenaeus (died c. 202) gives, in what seems intended for chronological order, a list of heresies, beginning with Simon Magus and ending with Tatian, and adds in a kind of appendix a description of a variety of Gnostic sects deriving their origin, as Irenaeus maintains, from the heresy of Simon Magus (Against Heresies 1:23-28). This chronology is not considered historically accurate by most modern authors.

He details what has been identified by subsequent writers as an Ophite cosmogony. Creation began as a series of emanations:

The True and Holy Church:

- Bythos (Depth):
  - Father of All (the First Man):
    - Ennoia, the Son of Man (the Second Man):
      - The Holy Spirit, the First Woman:
        - Water
        - Darkness
        - The Abyss
        - Chaos

Of the beauty of the Holy Spirit, both First and Second Man became enamoured, and they generated from her a third male, an Incorruptible Light, called Christ.

=== Sophia ===
But the excess of light with which she had been impregnated was more than she could contain, and while Christ her right-hand birth was borne upward with his mother, forming with the First and Second Man the True and Holy Church, a drop of light fell on the left hand downwards into the world of matter, and was called Sophia (Wisdom) or Prunikos, an androgynous being.

By this arrival the still waters were set in motion, all things rushing to embrace the Light, and Prunikos wantonly playing with the waters, assumed to herself a body, without the protection of which the light was in danger of being completely absorbed by matter. Yet when oppressed by the grossness of her surroundings, she strove to escape the waters and ascend to her mother, the body weighed her down, and she could do no more than arch herself above the waters, constituting thus the visible heaven. In process of time, however, by intensity of desire she was able to free herself from the encumbrance of the body, and leaving it behind to ascend to the region immediately above, called in the language of another sect the middle region.

=== Ialdabaoth ===
Meanwhile a son, Ialdabaoth, born to her from her contact with the waters, having in him a certain breath of the incorruptible light left him from his mother, by means of which he works, generates from the waters a son without any mother. And this son in like manner another, until there were seven Archons in all, ruling the seven heavens; a Hebdomad which their mother completes into an Ogdoad.

- Ialdabaoth (possibly from Hebrew yalda bahut 'son of chaos'), the Demiurge
- Iao
- Sabaoth
- Adonaios
- Elaios
- Astaphanos
- Horaios (from Hebrew or 'light')

But it came to pass that these sons strove for mastery with their father Ialdabaoth, whereat he suffered great affliction, and casting his despairing gaze on the dregs of matter below, he, through them, consolidated his longing and obtained a son Ophiomorphus, the serpent-formed Nous, whence come the spirit and soul, and all things of this lower world; but whence came also oblivion, wickedness, jealousy, envy, and death. Ialdabaoth, stretching himself over his upper heaven, had shut out from all below the knowledge that there was anything higher than himself, and having puffed up with pride at the sons whom he had begotten without help from his mother, he cried,

I am Father and God, and above me there is none other.

On this his mother, hearing him, cried out (1:30, 6),

Do not lie, Ialdabaoth, for above thee is the Father of All, the First Man, and the Son of Man.

When the heavenly powers marvelled at this voice, Ialdabaoth, to call off their attention, exclaimed, "Let us make man after our image." Then the six powers formed a gigantic man, the mother Sophia having given assistance to the design, in order that by this means she might recover the Light-fluid from Ialdabaoth. For the man whom the six powers had formed, lay unable to raise itself, writhing like a worm until they brought it to their father, who breathed into it the breath of life, and so emptied himself of his power. But the man having now Thought and Conception (Nous and Enthymesis), forthwith gave thanks to the First Man, disregarding those who had made him.

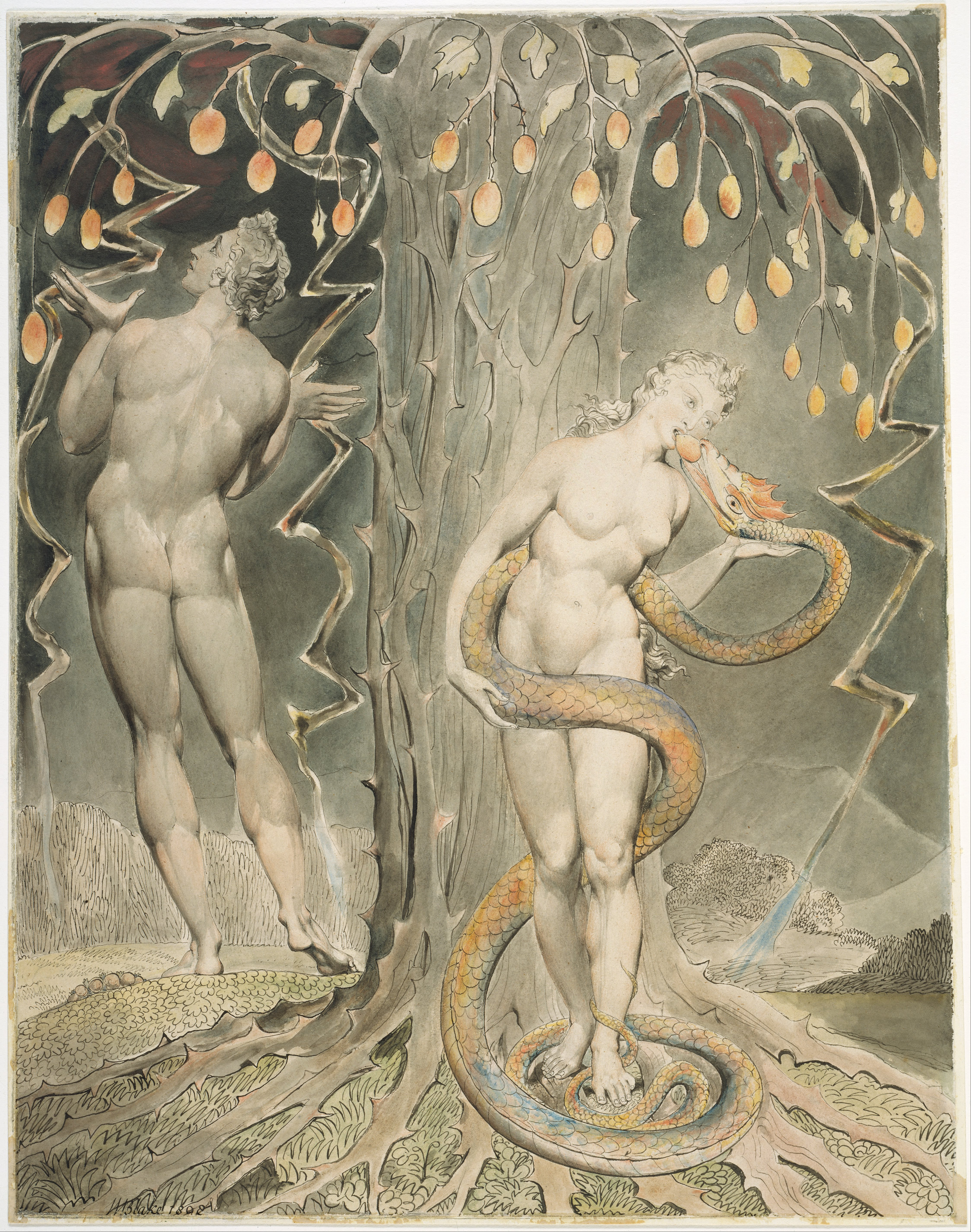
William Blake, The Temptation and Fall of Eve, 1808 (illustration of Milton's Paradise Lost)

At this Ialdabaoth, being jealous, planned to despoil the man by means of a woman, and formed Eve, of whose beauty the six powers being enamoured generated sons from her, namely, the angels. Then Sophia devised by means of the serpent to seduce Eve and Adam to transgress the precept of Ialdabaoth; and Eve, accepting the advice of one who seemed a Son of God, persuaded Adam also to eat of the forbidden tree. And when they ate they gained knowledge of the power which is over all, and revoked from those who had made them. Thereupon Ialdabaoth cast Adam and Eve out of Paradise; but the mother had secretly emptied them of the Light-fluid in order that it might not share the curse or reproach. So they were cast down into this world, as was also the serpent who had been detected in working against his father. He brought the angels here under his power, and himself generated six sons, a counterpart of the Hebdomad of which his father was a member. These seven demons always oppose and thwart the human race on whose account their father was cast down.

Adam and Eve at first had light and clear and, as it were, spiritual bodies, which on their fall became dull and gross; and their spirits were also languid because they had lost all but the breath of this lower world which their maker had breathed into them; until Prunikos taking pity on them gave them back the sweet odour of the Light-fluid through which they woke to a knowledge of themselves and knew that they were naked.

The above is clearly a variant of the account of the Creation given in chapter 1 of The Book of Genesis – but with the major difference that the single, omnipotent God of the original Biblical story is here depicted as Ialdabaoth – one of many Divine beings, and not the most important of them, with his claim to exclusive Godhood described as an arrogant and false usurpation.

The story proceeds to give a version of Old Testament history, in which Ialdabaoth is represented as making a series of efforts to obtain exclusive adoration for himself, and to avenge himself on those who refused to pay it, while he is counteracted by Prunikos, who strives to enlighten mankind as to the existence of higher powers more deserving of adoration. In particular the prophets who were each the organ of one of the Hebdomad, the glorification of whom was their main theme, were nevertheless inspired by Sophia to make fragmentary revelations about the First Man and about Christ above, whose descent also she caused to be predicted.

=== Redemption ===
And here we come to the version given of New Testament history in this system. Sophia, having no rest either in heaven or on earth, implored the assistance of her mother, the First Woman. She, moved with pity at her daughter's repentance, begged of the First Man that Christ should be sent down to her assistance. Sophia, apprized of the coming help, announced his advent by John, prepared the baptism of repentance, and by means of her son, Ialdabaoth, got ready a woman to receive the annunciation from Christ, in order that when he came there might be a pure and clean vessel to receive him, namely Jesus, who, being born of a virgin by divine power, was wiser, purer, and more righteous than any other man. Christ then descended through the seven heavens, taking the form of the sons of each as he came down, and depriving each of their rulers of his power. For wheresoever Christ came the Light-fluid rushed to him, and when he came into this world he first united himself with his sister Sophia, and they refreshed one another as bridegroom and bride, and the two united descended into Jesus (though never actually dwelling in his flesh), who thus became Jesus Christ. Then he began to work miracles, and to announce the unknown Father, and to declare himself manifestly the son of the First Man. Then Ialdabaoth and the other princes of the Hebdomad, being angry, sought to have Jesus crucified, but Christ and Sophia did not share his passion, having withdrawn themselves into the incorruptible Aeon. But Christ did not forget Jesus, but sent a power which raised his body up, not indeed his choical body, for "flesh and blood cannot lay hold of the kingdom of God," but his animal and spiritual body. So it was that Jesus did no miracles, either before his baptism, when he was first united to Christ, or after his resurrection, when Christ had withdrawn himself from him. Jesus then remained on earth after his resurrection eighteen months, at first himself not understanding the whole truth, but enlightened by a revelation subsequently made him, which he taught to a chosen few of his disciples, and then was taken up to heaven.

The story proceeds to tell that Christ, sitting on the right hand of the father Ialdabaoth, without his knowledge enriches himself with the souls of those who had known him, inflicting a corresponding loss on Ialdabaoth. For as righteous souls instead of returning to him are united to Christ, Ialdabaoth is less and less able to bestow any of the Light-fluid on souls afterwards entering this world, and can only breathe into them his own animal breath. The consummation of all things will take place when, by successive union of righteous souls with Christ, the last drop of the Light-fluid shall be recovered from this lower world.

=== Significance ===
The system here expounded evidently implies a considerable knowledge of the Old Testament on the part either of its inventor or expounder. It begins with "the spirit of God moving on the face of the waters," and it summarises the subsequent history, even mentioning the sacred writers by name. Yet that it is not the work of those amicable to Judaism is evident from the hostility shown to the God of the Jews, who is represented as a mixture of arrogance and ignorance, waging war against idolatry from mere love of self-exaltation, yet constantly thwarted and overcome by the skill of superior knowledge. The feminine attributes ascribed to the Holy Spirit indicate that Greek was not the native language of the framer of this system, and this conclusion is confirmed by the absence of elements derived from Greek philosophic systems. If, for instance, we compare this system with that of Valentinus, we discover at once so much agreement in essential features as to assure us of the substantial identity of the foundation of the two systems; but the Valentinian system contains several things derived from Greek philosophy, whereas that which we have described can be explained from purely Oriental sources. We are entitled therefore to regard the latter as representing the more original form. The reporter of this system is clearly acquainted with the New Testament, since he adopts a phrase from the Epistle to the Corinthians; he knows that Jesus habitually spoke of himself as Son of Man; and in denying that Jesus performed miracles before his baptism, he adopts the history as told in the Gospels in opposition to that told in apocryphal Gospels of the Infancy. The place which the doctrine of a Trinity holds in this system is significant.

Although, following Theodoret, we have given the name Ophite to the system described by Irenaeus, it will have been seen that the doctrine concerning the serpent forms a very subordinate part of the system. In the passage immediately following the chapter we have analysed, Irenaeus shows acquaintance with a section of the school who may be called Ophite in the proper sense of the word, some teaching that Sophia herself was the serpent, some glorifying Cain and other enemies of the God of the Old Testament.

If we were to single out what we regard as the most characteristic feature of the scheme, it is the prominence given to the attribute of light as the property of the good Principle. This feature is still more striking in the derived system of Pistis Sophia, where the mention of light is of perpetual occurrence, and the dignity of every being is measured by the brilliancy of its light.

In the section of Irenaeus immediately preceding that of which we have just given an account, there is a summary of a system which has been called Barbeliot, from its use of the name Barbelo to denote the supreme female principle. It contains some of the essential features of the scheme just described, of which it seems to have been a development, principally characterized by a great wealth of nomenclature, and, with the exception of the name which has given a title to the system, all derived from the Greek language.

== Clement of Alexandria ==
Clement of Alexandria (c. 150-c. 215) incidentally mentions Cainites and Ophites, (Stromata 7:17) but gives no explanation of their tenets. Nor do we suppose that there is any reason to connect with this sect his reprobation of the use of serpent ornaments by women (Instructor 2:13).

== Origen ==
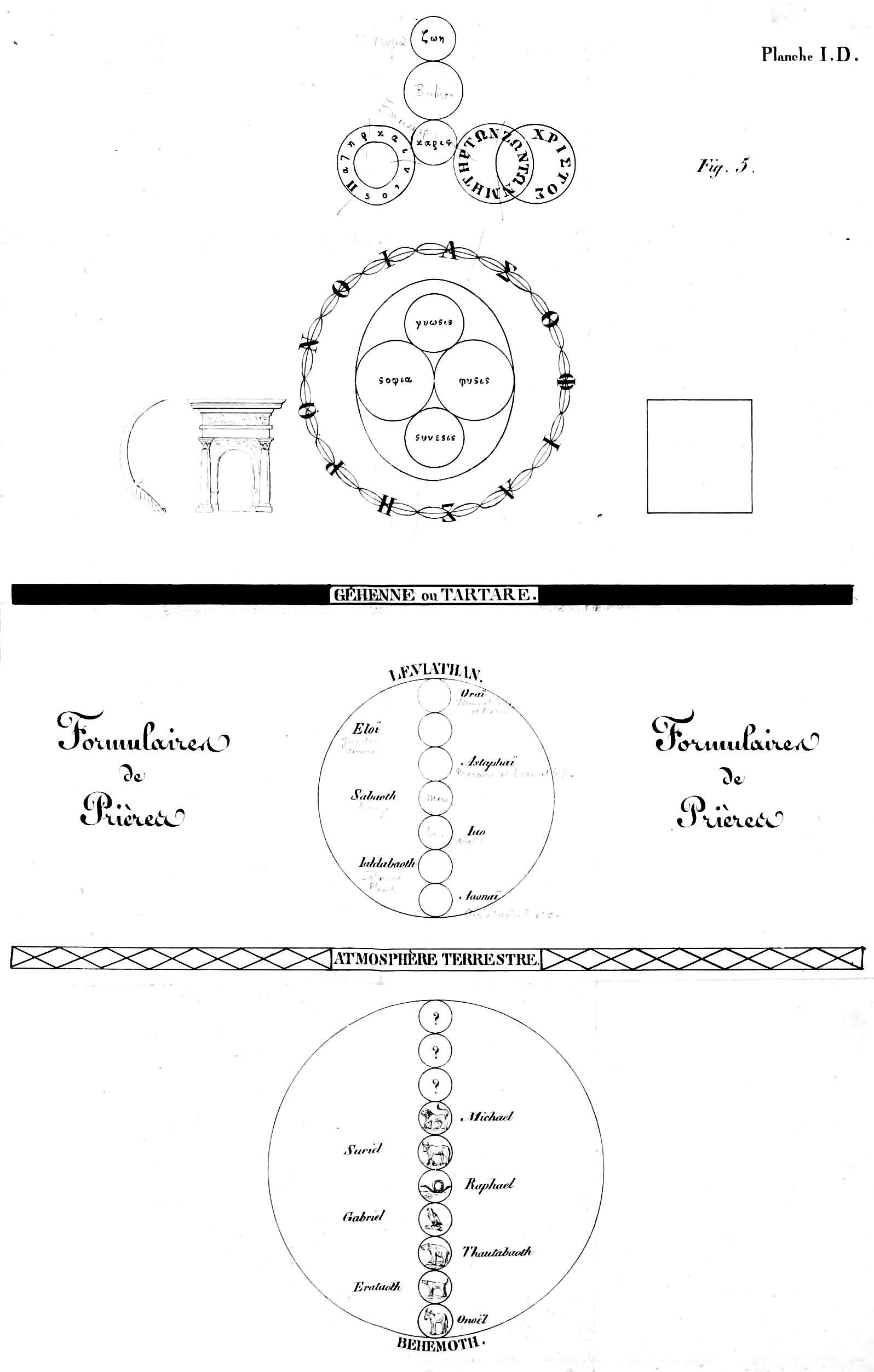
Reconstruction of Ophite Diagram from Histoire critique du Gnosticisme; Jacques Matter, 1826, Vol. III, Plate I, D.

Origen (c. 185–254) is led to speak of the Ophites (Contra Celsum 6:28) by an accusation of Celsus that the Christians counted seven heavens, and spoke of the Creator as an accursed divinity, inasmuch as he was worthy of execration for cursing the serpent who introduced the first human beings to the knowledge of good and evil. Origen replies that Celsus had mixed up matters, and had confounded the Christians with the Ophites, who so far from being Christians would not hear the name of Jesus, nor own him to have been so much as a wise and virtuous man, nor would admit anyone into their assembly until he had cursed Jesus. It may be doubted whether Origen has not here been misinformed about a sect of which he intimates that he knows but little. According to all other authorities the Ophites claimed to be Christians. Elsewhere Origen classes the Ophites as heretics of the graver sort with the followers of Marcion, Valentinus, Basilides, and Apelles (Commentary on Matthew 3:852). The identity of the nomenclature shows that for Origen, these Ophites of Origen are a branch of the unnamed sect described by Irenaeus.

=== Hebdomad ===
The names of the seven princes of the Hebdomad, as given by Origen, agree completely with the list of Irenaeus (Contra Celsum 6:31). Origen also gives the names of the seven demons. Irenaeus only gives the name of their chief, but that one is enough to establish a more than accidental coincidence, since it is a name we should not have expected to find as the name of a demon, namely, Michael. The name Prunikos is also found in the report of Origen. Origen gives what must have been one of the valuable secrets of this sect, viz. the formula to be addressed by an ascending soul to each of the princes of the hebdomad in order to propitiate him to grant a passage through his dominions. Perhaps the secret would have been more jealously guarded if it were not that in addition to the use of the formula, it seems to have been necessary to produce at each gate a certain symbol. These would only be in the possession of the initiated, and we may imagine that they were buried with them. He gives the formulae in the inverse order; i.e. first the formula to be used by a soul which has passed through the highest heaven and desires to enter the Ogdoad; next the formula to be used in order to gain admission to the highest heaven, and so on.

=== Diagrams ===
Origen also gives a description of an Ophite diagram, which Celsus likewise had met with, consisting of an outer circle, named Leviathan, denoting the soul of all things, with ten internal circles, variously coloured, the diagram containing also the figures and names of the seven demons. Many have attempted to reproduce the figure from Origen's description, but in truth Origen has not given us particulars enough to enable us to make a restoration with confidence, or even to enable us to understand what was intended to be represented. Origen names Euphrates as the introducer of the doctrine of the sect which he describes, and the sect may have been that branch of the Ophites who are called Peratae.

== Epiphanius ==
They have a snake, which they keep in a certain chest—the cista mystica—and which at the hour of their mysteries they bring forth from its cave. They heap loaves upon the table and summon the serpent. Since the cave is open it comes out. It is a cunning beast and, knowing their foolish ways, it crawls up on the table and rolls in the loaves; this they say is the perfect sacrifice. Wherefore, as I have been told, they not only break the bread in which the snake has rolled and administer it to those present, but each one kisses the snake on the mouth, for the snake has been tamed by a spell, or has been made gentle for their fraud by some other diabolical method. And they fall down before it and call this the Eucharist, consummated by the beast rolling in the loaves. And through it, as they say, they send forth a hymn to the Father on high, thus concluding their mysteries.

— Panarion 1:37

Ophite teaching was, most likely, dying out in the days of Hippolytus; in the time of Epiphanius it was not absolutely extinct, but the notices in his work would lead us to think of it as but the eccentric doctrine of some stray heretic here and there, and not to have counted many adherents. In the 5th century Theodoret tells (Heresies 1:24) of having found serpent worship practised in his diocese by people whom he calls Marcionites, but whom we may believe to have been really Ophites.

== Nag Hammadi texts ==
Of the Nag Hammadi Gnostic texts that mention the serpent, three appear related to early church accounts of the Ophites. These texts are Hypostasis of the Archons, On the Origin of the World, and the Apocryphon of John.

== Modern emulation ==
Our Lady of Endor Coven, a cult established in 1948, was strongly influenced by the teachings of the ancient Ophites, as given in the above sources.

== See also ==
- Ophite Diagrams
- Naassenes (from Hebrew na'asch = snake)
- Nehushtan
- Sethians
- Mandaeans
- Ophion
- Perates
- Borborites
- The Worship of the Serpent
- Snake worship
- Serpent seed
