= G. R. S. Mead =

English author, editor, translator, and theosophist

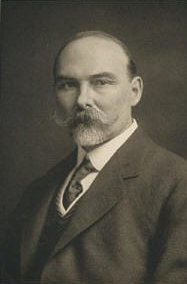
G. R. S. Mead

George Robert Stow Mead (22 March 1863, London – 28 September 1933, London) was an English historian, writer, editor, translator, and an influential member of the Theosophical Society, as well as the founder of the Quest Society. His works dealt with various religious and philosophical texts and traditions, including Neoplatonism, Hermeticism and Gnosticism.

== Birth and family ==
Mead was born in Peckham, Surrey (now in London), England, to British Army Colonel Robert Mead and his wife Mary (née Stow), who had received a traditional education at Rochester Cathedral School.

== Education ==
Mead began studying mathematics at St John's College, Cambridge. Eventually shifting his education towards the study of Classics, he gained much knowledge of Greek and Latin. In 1884 he completed a BA degree; in the same year he became a public school master. He received an MA degree in 1926.

== Activity with the Theosophical Society ==
While still at Cambridge University, Mead read Esoteric Buddhism (1883) by Alfred Percy Sinnett, which presumably prompted his initial interest in Theosophy and led him to join Helena Petrovna Blavatsky's Theosophical Society in 1884.

After becoming Blavatsky's private secretary in 1889, Mead was elected as the general secretary (jointly with Bertram Keightley) of the Esoteric Section of the Theosophical Society as well as one of twelve members of its Inner Group. Mead met Laura Mary Cooper (later to become his wife) in the latter group, and attended all but one of the total of twenty meetings held for its members.

Together with Annie Besant, Mead was the last editor of the Theosophical magazine Lucifer (renamed The Theosophical Review in 1897) and served as the magazine's sole editor between 1907 and 1909, when it became defunct due to Mead leaving the Theosophical Society.

As of February 1909, Mead and some 700 members of the British Section of the Theosophical Society's British Section resigned in protest of Annie Besant's reinstatement of Charles Webster Leadbeater to membership in the society. Leadbeater had been a prominent member of the Theosophical Society until he was accused in 1906 of teaching masturbation to, and sexually touching, the sons of some American Theosophists under the guise of occult training. While this prompted Mead's resignation, his frustration at the dogmatism of the Theosophical Society may also have been a major contributor to his break after 25 years.

== The Quest Society ==
In March 1909 Mead founded the Quest Society, composed of 150 defectors of the Theosophical Society and 100 other new members. This new society was planned as an undogmatic approach to the comparative study and investigation of religion, philosophy, and science. The Quest Society presented lectures at the old Kensington Town Hall in central London but its most focused effort was in its publishing of The Quest: A Quarterly Review which ran from 1909 to 1931 with many historically important contributors.

== Influence ==
Notable persons influenced by Mead include Ezra Pound, W. B. Yeats, Hermann Hesse, Kenneth Rexroth, and Robert Duncan. The influence of G. R. S. Mead on Carl Gustav Jung has been suggested by Gnosticism scholar and a friend of Jung's, Gilles Quispel, and the issue has been further discussed by a number of scholars. Being the first individual to provide an English translation of the Gnostic text Pistis Sophia, Mead played an important role in the popularization of the notion of "Gnosis" as an important facet of ancient Gnosticism, as well as general concept in religions across time and space.

== Works ==
- Address read at H.P. Blavatsky's cremation (1891)
- Simon Magus (London: Theosophical Publ. Soc'y, 1892)
- The Word-Mystery: Four Essays (London: Theosophical Publ. Soc'y, 1895), revised as The Word-Mystery: Four Comparative Studies in General Theosophy (London: Theosophical Publ. Soc'y, 1907)
- Select Works of Plotinus (London: George Bell, 1896)
- Orpheus (London: Theosophical Publ. Soc'y, 1896)
- Pistis Sophia: The Book of the Saviour (London: J.M. Watkins, 1896; revised 2nd ed. 1921)
- Fragments of a Faith Forgotten (London: Theosophical Publ. Soc'y 1900)
- Apollonius of Tyana (London: Theosophical Publ. Soc'y, 1901)
- Did Jesus Live 100 BC? (London: Theosophical Publ. Soc'y, 1903)
- "Concerning H.P.B.: Stray Thoughts on Theosophy", The Theosophical Review (April 15, 1904), pp. 131–44
- The Corpus Hermeticum (1905)
- Thrice Greatest Hermes: Studies in Hellenistic Theosophy and Gnosis (London: Theosophical Publ. Soc'y, 1906)
  - Volume 1
  - Volume 2
  - Volume 3
- Echoes from the Gnosis (11-part series published at London by The Theosophical Publ. Soc'y):
  - Volume I: The Gnosis of the Mind (1906)
  - Volume II: The Hymns of Hermes (1906)
  - Volume III: GRS Mead: The Vision Of Aridæus (1907)
  - Volume IV: The Hymn of Jesus (1907)
  - Volume V: The Mysteries Of Mithra (1907)
  - Volume VI: A Mithraic Ritual (1907)
  - Volume VII: The Gnostic Crucifixion (1907)
  - Volume VIII: The Chaldæan Oracles Vol. 1 (1907)
  - Volume IX: The Chaldæan Oracles Vol. 2 (1907)
  - Volume X: The Hymn of the Robe of Glory (1907)
  - Volume XI: The Wedding Song of Wisdom (1907)
- Some Mystical Adventures (London: John M. Watkins, 1910)
- Quests Old and New (London: Watkins, 1913)
- Doctrine of the Subtle Body in Western Tradition (London: J.M. Watkins, 1919)
- Gnostic John the Baptizer: Selections from the Mandæan John-Book (London: Watkins, 1924)

== See also ==
- Poemandres
- Gospel of Marcion
- Pistis Sophia
- Thomas Taylor
- Hermetica
- Acts of John
- Mandaeanism
- Marcionism
- Mohini Mohun Chatterji
- Hymn of the Pearl
