= Modern pseudepigrapha =

Pseudepigrapha of recent origin

Modern pseudepigrapha, or modern apocrypha, are pseudepigrapha of recent origin – any book written in the style of the books of the Bible or other religious scriptures, and claiming to be of similar age, but written in a much later (modern) period. They differ from apocrypha, which are books from or shortly after the scriptural period but not accepted into the religion's canon. Exposing modern pseudepigrapha is part of the fields of palaeography and papyrology, amongst others.

== Terminology ==
British biblical scholar Philip R. Davies (1945–2018) defined "modern pseudepigrapha" (singular "pseudepigraphon") in 2002 as "writings in the name of biblical personages composed by contemporary scholars."

The term "modern apocrypha" (singular "apocryphon") is closely related to and is often treated as synonymous with "modern pseudepigrapha". But while a pseudepigraphon is by definition a forgery (a document written with the intention to deceive its readers as to its true origins, or more narrowly, written by someone else than the person the text itself claims to be the author), an apocryphon is not necessarily a forgery; the author can also be anonymous and not intent on deception. In the minority view held by scholars such as Eric Vanden Eykel, even admittedly fictitious 21st-century Christian texts involving ancient biblical figures written by authors using their real names may be considered "modern apocrypha". Some writings, even canonical ones, were originally anonymous, and only later copyists and compilers – either accidentally or intentionally – attributed the wrong authors to them.

According to Tony Burke, "scholarly forgery" is "the contemporary creation of a text with the attendant claim of its discovery in an ancient manuscript", a practice which he claims began in the Renaissance.

== History ==
=== 19th and 20th century ===
The rise of the field of modern biblical textual criticism has led to a hunt for ancient manuscripts containing textual variants in the New Testament and Old Testament, as well as related Jewish and early Christian writings. Discovery, collection and study of these fragments have been instrumental to – as far as possible – reconstructing the original texts of the Bible and other religious scriptures of high interest, and how they evolved over the centuries. The importance of these fragments has considerably raised their market value, and finding an acquiring them became a multimillion-dollar trade after 1945, when the Nag Hammadi library and the Dead Sea Scrolls were discovered. Many forgers and fraudsters have sought to exploit this scholarly desire by fabricating manuscripts to sell them for profit. Therefore, inquiring after their provenance and testing both linguistically as well as materially whether any newly emerging fragments are authentic has become increasingly relevant.

The systematic study of modern apocrypha is understood to have begun with the publication of Edgar J. Goodspeed's book Strange New Gospels (1931), which he later expanded with new chapters, and fully updated with the 1956 book Modern Apocrypha (subsequent editions were entitled Famous Biblical Hoaxes). Per Beskow (1926–2016) is considered the second-most famous scholar of modern apocrypha after Goodspeed, starting with his 1985 essay collection Strange Tales about Jesus.

=== 21st century ===
==== William Kando fragments ====
According to a researcher quoted in The Guardian in November 2017, up to 90% of the 75 Dead Sea Scrolls fragments sold since 2002 could be fakes. Most of these fragments are directly or indirectly connected to William Kando, son of antiques dealer Khalil Eskander Shahin (better known as "Kando"), who bought the Scrolls from the Bedouins who found them in 1945. William Kando opened his family's vault in Zürich in 2000, and ever since has been selling fragments he claims to be authentic remnants of the Scrolls to rich American evangelical Christians who are willing to spend huge amounts of money to find out more about the Bible's origins. After the Museum of the Bible (MOTB) opened in Washington, D.C. in November 2017, academics were skeptical about the authenticity of the 16 Dead Sea Scrolls fragments displayed there. Researchers at the Federal Institute for Materials Research and Testing in Germany took several months to test 5 of the MOTB's 16 artefacts, and concluded all five were forgeries that could not have been produced in antiquity. Embarrassed by the finding, the MOTB stated that 'Though we had hoped the testing would render different results, this is an opportunity to educate the public on the importance of verifying the authenticity of rare biblical artifacts, the elaborate testing process undertaken and our commitment to transparency.' Examination of the remaining fragments was still ongoing, with researcher Kipp Davis claiming that at least seven of the total were most likely forged. In March 2020, after lengthy investigations, MOTB confirmed that all the 16 fragments were forgeries.

==== Gospel of Jesus' Wife ====
First presented by Karen Leigh King at a 2012 scholarly conference in Rome, the unprovenanced Gospel of Jesus' Wife was quickly shown to be a modern fabrication, largely plagiarised from the Gospel of Thomas.

== Techniques and exposure ==
In order to attempt to conceal their deception, fraudsters may simply buy ancient papyrus, for example online or in an Egyptian souk. This saves them time and effort on producing fake papyrus, and it results in a credible carbon-14 dating when tested in a laboratory. There are also ways of counterfeiting ink and writing to make the text appear ancient.

Therefore, papyrologists generally do not rely on testing the material of questionable fragments, but only consider papyri from documented archaeological excavations and papyri with a verifiable provenance to be authentic. There are ethical codes to discourage the usage of any unprovenanced finds, because these can be the result of fabrication or looting. Whenever undocumented papyri appear, the burden of proof is on those who claim they are authentic.

Historical linguistics are often an effective method to expose modern pseudepigrapha. A text can show linguistic anachronisms when compared to known authentic documents from the same historical period, or to be plagiarised. For example, the text from the so-called Gospel of Jesus' Wife (2012) was found to be copied from the Gospel of Thomas.

== Examples ==
Works commonly considered to be modern pseudepigrapha:

- The Aquarian Gospel of Jesus the Christ (1908)
- The Archko Volume (1884)
- Book of Jasher (1751)
- The Confessions of Pontius Pilate
- The Crucifixion of Jesus, by an Eyewitness (1907)
- The Description of Christ
- Essene Gospel of Peace (1923)
- Gospel of Jesus' Wife (2012)
- Gospel of Josephus (1927)
- The Gospel of the Holy Twelve (1898)
- The Letter from Heaven (1922)
- Letter of Benan (1910)
- Life of Issa (allegedly discovered by Nicolas Notovitch in 1894)
- The Lost Chapter of the Acts of the Apostles
- Oahspe (1882)

== See also ==
- Historicity of the Book of Mormon
