= List of religious hoaxes =

List of links to Wikipedia articles on religious hoaxes

This is a list of hoaxes related to religion.

== In Christianity ==
- Aquarian Gospel of Jesus the Christ – 1908 book by American preacher Levi H. Dowling who claimed to have transcribed the text from the akashic records, a purported compendium of mystical knowledge supposedly encoded in a non-physical plane of existence.
- Book of Jasher – the name of a lost book mentioned several times in the Bible, which was subject to at least two high-profile forgeries in the 18th and 19th century.
- Gospel of Barnabas - a Late Middle Age forgery attributed to the Apostle Barnabas. Many of its teachings are synchronous with the Quran, and the Bible. It teaches the nine-hells, similar to in Dante's Divina Comedia.
- Gospel of Josephus – 1927 forgery attributed to Jewish historian Flavius Josephus, actually created by Italian writer Luigi Moccia to raise publicity for one of his novels.
- Letter of Benan – an alleged translation of a 5th-century Coptic papyrus containing a description by an Egyptian physician of his encounters with Jesus and the apostles. Created by Ernst Edler von der Planitz in 1910.
- Letter of Lentulus – document that appeared in 15th century Florence and purported to be a letter written by one Publius Lentulus, governor of Judea, in which a physical description of Jesus Christ is given. The document greatly influenced depictions of Christ in contemporary art.
- Maria Monk – 1836 account of large-scale sexual abuse of Catholic nuns and infanticide at the hands of male clergy in Montreal, Lower Canada, widely believed to be a hoax capitalizing on the anti-Catholic sentiments of the time
- Monita Secreta – alleged Jesuit instructions to use unethical methods to increase the order's wealth and influence. Most likely an anti-Jesuit forgery created in 1615 by Jerome Zahorowski, a Polish friar who was expelled from the order a few years before.
- Oahspe: A New Bible – 1882 work by American dentist John Ballou Newbrough, written via automatic writing.
- Priory of Sion – alleged secret society founded in 1099 by Godfrey on Bouillon and dedicated to maintaining the Merovingian dynasty on the throne of Francia. Actually created by Pierre Plantard in the 1960s. It was an important influence on the 1982 pseudohistorical work The Holy Blood and the Holy Grail and the 2003 novel The Da Vinci Code
- Prophecy of the Popes – 112 short, cryptic phrases which are supposed to predict the Catholic Popes from Celestine II (1143–1144) onward. First published by Benedictine monk Arnold Wion in 1595 and most probably created around that time. The phrases correctly apply to popes up to 1590, while falling short of clear predictions from then on. Some adherents continued to try to find links between the phrases and subsequent popes, claiming that Pope Francis was the 112th and final pope of the prophecy.
- Pseudo-Dionysius the Areopagite – theologian and philosopher of the late 5th to early 6th century who wrote the set of works known as Corpus Areopagiticum, while claiming to be Dionysius the Areopagite, convert of Paul the Apostle mentioned in the Book of Acts. The writings were highly influential in Western mysticism until the 15th century, when they were properly dated.
- The Lost Chapter of the Acts of the Apostles – also known as the Sonnini Manuscript, it was first published in London in 1871 and claims to be a translation of a Greek manuscript detailing the end of the Book of Acts, where Paul the Apostle travels to Britannia
- The Boy Who Came Back from Heaven – 2010 book describing Alex Malarkey's experiences in heaven after a traffic accident in 2004. Malarkey, who was 6 years old when the accident happened, later disavowed the account, calling it "one of the most deceptive books ever".
- The Unknown Life of Jesus Christ – 1894 book by Russian journalist and adventurer Nicolas Notovitch purporting that Jesus visited India during his unknown years, studying under Hindu and Buddhist masters. Allegedly based on the document Life of Saint Issa, Best of the Sons of Men, which was seen by him at the Hemis Monastery in Ladakh, India.

=== Mormonism ===
- Kinderhook plates – engraved metal plates that were allegedly discovered in Kinderhook, Illinois in 1843, but were actually created by three men attempting to test Mormon leader Joseph Smith into "translating" the engravings. One of the men later admitted to the ruse and modern dating confirmed they are 19th-century forgeries.
- Salamander letter – document alleging certain visions of Mormon leader Joseph Smith that were at odds with the Church's views which proved to have been created by Mark Hofmann in the 1980s. Part of a larger trove of fake documents that led to Hofmann being referred to as "unquestionably the most skilled forger this country has ever seen". When threatened with exposure, he used pipe bombs to kill two people in his attempt to keep the forgery a secret and is currently serving life in prison.

== In Hinduism ==
- 2006 Mumbai sweet seawater incident
- Hindu milk miracle

== In Judaism ==
- The Protocols of the Elders of Zion – notorious antisemitic fake, alleging to be a Jewish plan for global domination. First published in 1903 in Russia and exposed as fraudulent by The Times of London in 1921, the document occasionally continues to be presented as genuine.

== In Islam ==
- Allah as a lunar deity
- Surah of Wilaya and Nurayn – two surahs that are seen as forgeries by both Sunni and Shi'a Muslims. While the source of these texts is not clear, they have been used to accuse Shi'ites of corrupting the Qur'an by adding them to the official text, an accusation that is widely rejected by the Shi'a community.
- Sexual jihad
- Prank of Bardakçı Baba - Tomb of an alleged sufi mystic in Istanbul, that attracted popular devotion for 50 years.

== In Paganism ==
- Book of Veles – text engraved on wooden planks alleged to date from the 9th and 10th century which document ancient Slavic religion and history. The claim states that the planks were found in 1919, transcribed and then lost in 1941. Largely considered to be a forgery created around the middle of the 20th century, it is nonetheless seen as a sacred text by some Slavic neopagans.
