= Székely (surname) =

Székely is a Hungarian-language surname. The word "Székely" refers to Hungarian people from the historical region of Transylvania, Romania.

The related surnames, resulted from various transliterations and translations, are Szekely, Sekely, Sekelj, Szekler, Sekler, Secui.

It may refer to:

- András Székely, a Hungarian swimmer
- Árpád Székely, the Ambassador Extraordinary and Plenipotentiary of the Republic of Hungary to the Russian Federation
- Béla Székely, (17 July 1889 – 10 January 1939) was a Hungarian politician
- Bertalan Székely, a Hungarian Romantic painter
- Bulcsú Székely, a Hungarian water polo player
- Deborah Szekely (born Shainman), an American philanthropist active in mind/body wellness, founder of the spa-fitness movement
- Edmund Bordeaux Szekely, a Hungarian linguist, philosopher, and naturopath
- Éva Székely (1927–2020), a Hungarian swimmer
- Ferenc Székely (11 March 1842 – 17 March 1921) was a Hungarian politician
- Gábor J. Székely, a Hungarian-American statistician and mathematician
- György (Székely) Dózsa
- Györgyi Marvalics-Székely, a Hungarian Olympic fencer
- János Székely (b. 1983), a Romanian footballer
- János Székely (writer) (1901 – 1958), a Jewish Hungarian writer
- János Székely (bishop) (b. 1964), a Hungarian bishop
- Júlia Székely (8 May 1906 – 19 March 1986) a Hungarian writer and musician
- Kinga Székely (born 1945), a Hungarian geologist, cartographer
- Louis C.K. (born Louis Székely), an American comedian
- Mihály Székely May 8, 1901; died Budapest, March 22, 1963) was a Hungarian bass singer
- Mózes Székely, a ruler of Transylvania
- Péter Székely, a Hungarian chess Grandmaster
- Szabolcs Székely, a Romanian football player
- Violeta Szekely, a Romanian middle-distance runner
- Vladimír Székely, a Hungarian physicist
- Zoltán Székely, a Hungarian violinist

Variations

- Steve Sekely, (born István Székely), film director
- Les Sekely, an American radio talk show host
- Tibor Sekelj (born Tibor Székely), explorer
- Matjaž Sekelj, Slovenian hockey player and coach
