= Bardakçı =

Bardakçı is a Turkish word meaning "glass maker". It may refer to:

== People ==
- Abdülkerim Bardakcı (born 1994), Turkish footballer
- Murat Bardakçı (born 1955), Turkish journalist
- Ulaş Bardakçı (1947–1972), Turkish communist
- Vehbi Bardakçı (born 1956), Turkish author

== Places in Turkey ==
- Bardakçı, Çat, a neighborhood in the Çat district of Erzurum Province
- Bardakçı, Midyat, a neighborhood in the Midyat district of Mardşn Province
- Bardakçı, Pülümür, a village in the Pülümür district of Tunceli Province

== See also ==
- Prank of Bardakçı Baba, involving the fake tomb of a fictional mystic Alevi leader in Istanbul, Turkey
