= Gospel of peace =

Gospel of peace may refer to:

- "the preparation of the gospel of peace", part of the Armor of God mentioned in the New Testament Epistle to the Ephesians
- Essene Gospel of Peace, a New Testament apocryphon, a forgery by Edmond Bordeaux Szekely
