= Harvard Theological Review =

- Discipline: Religious Studies
- Language: English
- Edited by: Giovanni Bazzana

Publication details
- History: 1908-present
- Publisher: Cambridge University Press on behalf of the Harvard Divinity School (United States)
- Frequency: Quarterly

Standard abbreviations
- ISO 4: Harv. Theol. Rev.

Indexing
- ISSN: 0017-8160 (print); 1475-4517 (web)
- LCCN: 09003793
- OCLC no.: 803348474

Links
- Journal homepage; Online access; Online archive

The Harvard Theological Review is a quarterly peer-reviewed academic journal established in 1908 and published by Cambridge University Press on behalf of the Harvard Divinity School. It covers a wide spectrum of fields in theological and religious studies; its range is not limited to any one religious tradition or set of traditions. Giovanni Bazzana became the editor-in-chief in 2020, succeeding Jon D. Levenson and Kevin Madigan.

== Controversy ==
In 2014, the Review devoted a significant portion of its spring issue to the so-called "Gospel of Jesus' Wife" papyrus fragment introduced by Karen Leigh King, which was later found to be a forgery. Investigative journalist Ariel Shabar found that two out of three peer reviewers had thought that the Gospel was likely to be a forgery and that the sole favourable reviewer Roger S. Bagnall had a clear conflict of interest in that he had helped King draft the paper. Two other experts employed by the journal also had conflicts of interest. King disclaimed the authenticity of the fragment herself in 2016, but the Review has refused to retract its articles.

== Abstracting and indexing ==
The journal is abstracted and indexed in:

- IBZ International Bibliography of Periodical Literature
- Rambi (Index of Articles on Jewish Studies)
- FRANCIS
- Arts and Humanities Citation Index
- International Medieval Bibliography
- MLA Bibliography
- Index to Jewish Periodicals
