= Alberto Székely =

Mexican jurist

Alberto Székely Sánchez (Note: In this Spanish name, the first or paternal surname is Székely and the second or maternal family name is Sánchez.) (born 18 January 1946) is a Mexican jurist who was a professor of public international law at the University of Mexico from 1970 to 1991.

Székely Sánchez was born in Mexico City. After studying law at the National Autonomous University of Mexico (UNAM), from which he graduated in 1968, he earned a Master of Arts and a Master of Law and Diplomacy at the Fletcher School of Law and Diplomacy in the United States. He earned a doctorate in international law from the Faculty of Laws at University College London in 1976, entitled "A study of the contribution of the Latin American States to the development of the international law of the sea since 1945". Upon his return to Mexico, he was appointed professor of public international law at the University of Mexico in 1970. During his academic career, he held visiting appointments including at Arizona State University and Johns Hopkins University, and from 1976 to 1979 he advised the Mexican Ministry of Foreign Affairs on issues of public international law. Since 1986, Székely has also served as a member of the Permanent Court of Arbitration in The Hague, where since 2001 he has specialized in environmental law. He has been in private legal practice since 1991. In 2001, he was designated by Ireland as an ad hoc judge at the International Tribunal for the Law of the Sea (ITLOS) in the MOX Plant Case (Ireland v. United Kingdom). In the dispute between the Netherlands and Russia concerning the incidents involving the vessel Arctic Sunrise before an arbitral tribunal under the framework of the United Nations Convention on the Law of the Sea, Székely was appointed an arbitrator in January 2014.

== Publications ==
- Latin America and the Development of the Law of the Sea: Regional Documents and National Legislation. Oceana Publications, Dobbs Ferry, 1976, ISBN 0-379-10180-7.
- Bibliography on Latin America and the Law of the Sea. Law of the Sea Institute, Kingston, 1976.
- Instrumentos fundamentales de derecho internacional público: estudio introductorio. UNAM, Mexico City, 1989–90, ISBN 968-36-1036-6.
