= William Dennes Mahan =

William Dennes Mahan (July 27, 1824 - October 19, 1906) was an American Cumberland Presbyterian minister in Boonville, Missouri, and author of a book, commonly known as The Archko Volume (1884), purported to be a translation of a Jewish, Roman, and other contemporary documents about the trial and death of Jesus of Nazareth. The volume was initially received by some as true, but soon after its publication its authenticity was questioned. The book has been definitively discredited as a forgery and fraud.

== Life and career ==
William Dennes Mahan was born July 27, 1824, in Pittsylvania County, Virginia, to William P. and Permelia Mahan. In 1837 his family moved to Missouri, and by 1845, he was living in Saline County, Missouri, where he was serving as a minister in the Cumberland Presbyterian Church. Mahan married Martha R. Johnston in 1850, and together they had two daughters. Mahan was living and preaching in Boonville in 1872. Mahan died October 19, 1906, in Boonville and is buried there in Walnut Grove Cemetery.

== First forgery ==
In 1879 Mahan published a pamphlet of thirty-two pages entitled A Correct Transcript of Pilate's Court. It purported to be an official report of the trial and death of Jesus made directly to the Roman Emperor Tiberius by Pilate as governor of Judaea. Mahan claimed the text was supplied to him in 1856 by a German scholar, Henry C. Whydaman, from Father Peter Freelinhusen, "the chief guardian of the Vatican," who sent the Latin text to Whydaman’s brother-in-law, C. C. Vantberger of New York, for English translation. Whydaman, Freelinhusen, and Vantberger are otherwise unknown, and the documentation of the exchange contains inconsistencies and errors, including Freelinhusen’s request for a fee payable in "darics" (ancient Persian coins).

This work was copied almost verbatim from "Ponce Pilate à Vienne", a short story by Joseph Méry published in Revue de Paris in 1837. Méry said he had been inspired by an old Latin manuscript, and an 1842 English translation of the story made the claim that it was in fact taken from an old Latin manuscript. Mahan’s contribution was evidently to create correspondence showing him to be the discoverer of the manuscript.

== Archko forgery ==
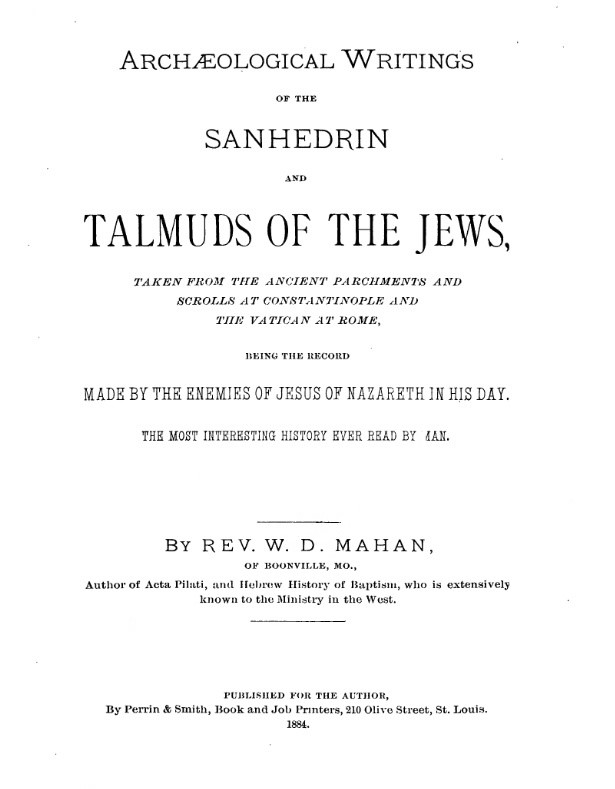
Title page of the first edition of The Archaeological Writings of the Sanhedrin and Talmuds of the Jews [etc.], 1884.

In 1884 Mahan published the first version of the Archko Volume, entitled The Archaeological Writings of the Sanhedrin and Talmuds of the Jews, Taken from the Ancient Parchments and Scrolls at Constantinople and the Vatican at Rome, Being the Record Made by the Enemies of Jesus of Nazareth in His Day: The Most Interesting History Ever Read by Man. This included an expanded version of "Pilate's Court" plus a series of other texts that he claimed to have obtained himself in a visit to Rome and Constantinople and translated with the aid of Dr. M. McIntosh of Scotland and Dr. Twyman of England, also otherwise unheard of. These texts include interviews with the shepherds, Gamaliel's interview with Joseph and Mary, Caiaphas's reports to the Sanhedrin, Eli's story of the Magi, Herod Antipater's defense before the Senate for the Massacre of the Innocents, and Herod Antipas's defense before the Senate—all with the claim that they were copied from ancient manuscripts and translated into English.

The texts are otherwise unknown to scholarship, and the volume contains various inconsistencies. It quotes an unknown Greek philosopher, "Meeleesen", and includes references to Josephus that do not exist. It mistakenly asserts that Philo spoke often of Jesus and that "the scribes of those days were most all Rabbis." There are inaccurate descriptions of the library of the Hagia Sophia in Constantinople, the making of papyrus, and an inaccurate chronology for both Philo and Tacitus. Contemporaries raised the question of whether Mahan could have possibly made the trip to Rome and Constantinople in less than two months. Most tellingly, large portions of "Eli and the Story of the Magi" were copied verbatim from the 1880 novel Ben-Hur. At one point, a strange word reveals that a single line of the printed text of Ben-Hur was accidentally omitted during copying.

== Exposure as a fraud ==
Among the first to call Mahan's work into question was Rev. Dr. James A. Quarles, of Lexington, Missouri. He was soon followed by William E. Curtis, a correspondent for the Chicago Record-Herald. In Rome, Curtis investigated Mahan's claims and declared the manuscript spurious and the alleged translation a forgery.

Mahan denied all the charges against him and asserted the truth of what he had written. He was summoned before church authorities in September 1885 on charges of falsehood and plagiarism, and a church trial was held. The New Lebanon Presbytery, of which he was a member, tried the case at length.

Evidence was introduced to show that Mahan had never been to Rome, but that he had spent the time he was absent from Boonville on a farm in Illinois. The editor of the Boonville Advertiser showed that the letters that paper had printed were postmarked from a small town in Illinois. Mahan rebutted the evidence by saying that they had been sent there to be re-mailed. Additional evidence that Mahan had not traveled to Rome included a letter from Father Ehrie, prefect of the Vatican Library. Ehrie stated that Mahan was entirely unknown there and that no person connected with the library had ever seen or heard of the "Acta Pilati" or any such manuscript.

Lew Wallace, author of Ben-Hur and American Envoy Extraordinary and Minister Plenipotentiary to the Ottoman Empire, testified that no record of Mahan’s visit to Turkey or to the library of the Hagia Sophia existed, and that the primary sources he cited were unknown.

The verdict of the presbytery was nearly unanimous. He was convicted and suspended from the ministry for one year. Following his suspension, Mahan made no effort to return to the pastorate, living the remainder of his life at the home of his son-in-law, a hotel keeper in Boonville. He declined to make any further statements regarding the part he had taken in the preparation of the book except to say when he was told that the literary world pronounced it a forgery: "Well, I have been a much deceived and a much persecuted man."

After the trial, Mahan also promised to withdraw the book from publication. But the book was reprinted many times beginning in 1887 by various publishers, likely with Mahan's knowledge and profit from the sales. The title Archko Volume appeared during this time, as did the note "Second edition". This second edition omits "Eli and the Story of the Magi" and also creates a preface using material from the introductions to the texts. No new original material is included, which suggests that this version was produced by a publisher's clerk. The omission of the Eli text suggests that the court verdict was known to the reviser.

A year after his suspension, the New Lebanon Presbytery submitted a resolution indefinitely dismissing Mahan from the ministry:

"Your committee to whom was referred the motion to grant W. D. Mahan a letter of dismission [sic] and recommendation after the term of his suspension expires, have had the subject under consideration, and in view of all the surrounding facts, and in view of the interests of the Church, we recommend the following:

Whereas, This Pres., at its session in Slater, Sept. 29th, 1885, did suspend from the functions of the ministry, for one year, W. D. Mahan; said one year terminating on the 29th of the present month; and

Whereas, The definite form of said suspension was more the result of sympathy for him and his family, than a desire for rigid administration of the law, and this sympathy being exercised under the hope that said W. D. Mahan would use all proper efforts to heal the wounds his course had inflicted; and,

Whereas, It now comes to the knowledge of this Pres., that he still occupies the same position, by the sale of his publications, and by negotiations to bring out new editions, therefore;

Resolved, That the suspension of the said W. D. Mahan, be, and the same is hereby declared indefinite, or, until he shall have complied with the law of the Church, as it applies in the case."

== Modern scholarship ==
The circumstances of composition, the letters to the Boonville Advertiser, and the proceedings of the church court were all investigated by Edgar J. Goodspeed and published in his books Strange New Gospels (1931) and Modern Apocrypha (1956). More recently Per Beskow (1983) identified Mahan's original sources and reported on subsequent editions of the Archko Volume.

== See also ==
- The Archko Volume
- Literary forgery
