= Charles-Nicolas-Sigisbert Sonnini de Manoncourt =

French naturalist

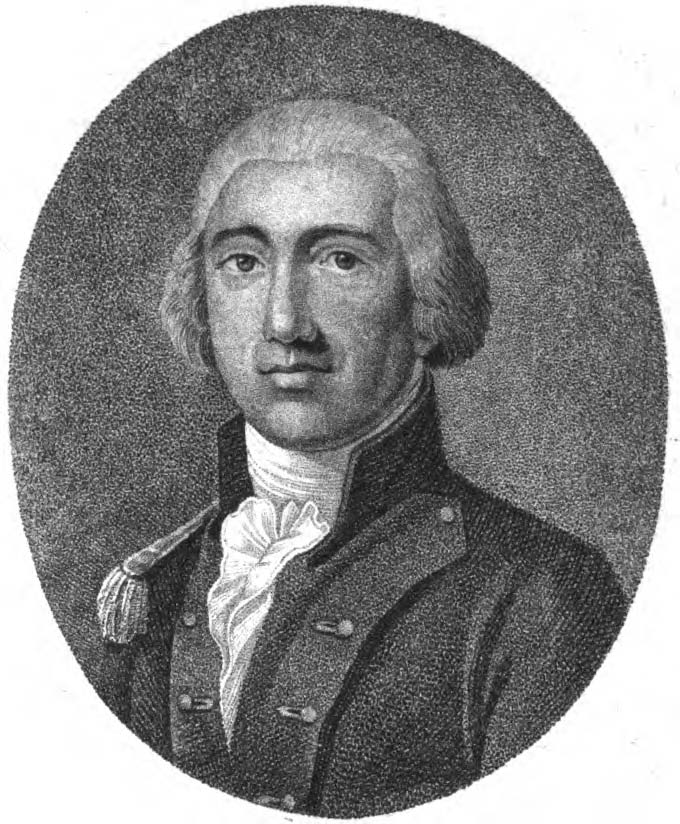
- Charles-Nicolas-Sigisbert Sonnini de Manoncourt
- Born: 1 February 1751; Lunéville
- Died: 9 May 1812 (aged 61); Paris
- Occupation: Botanist

Signature
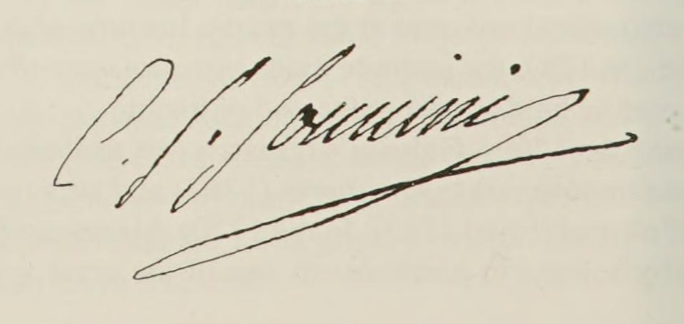

Charles-Nicolas-Sigisbert Sonnini de Manoncourt (1 February 1751 – 9 May 1812) was a French naturalist.

== Career ==
Between 1799 and 1808, Sonnini de Manoncourt wrote 127 volumes of the Histoire naturelle. Noteworthy among these, especially for herpetologists, is Histoire naturelle des Reptiles, avec figures desinées d'après nature, in four volumes, which he wrote with Pierre André Latreille. This work includes descriptions and illustrations of many North American reptiles.

Another important work attributed to him is The Lost Chapter of the Acts of the Apostles, also dubbed the Sonnini manuscript, which was allegedly found in his publication Voyage en Grèce et en Turquie and later published and translated to English sometime not earlier than 1801. The work, which first appeared in London in 1871, has received mixed opinions from different Christians, with most scholars rejecting it as a modern pseudepigraph.

== Publications in English ==
- Sonnini de Manoncourt, Travels to Upper and Lower Egypt, 1799, translated by Rev. Henry Hunter
- C. S. Sonnini, Travels in Greece and Turkey, 1801. (Volume I & Volume II)
