= Adrien (dancer) =

French dancer and choreographer

Adrien, né Julien-Adrien Renoux (27 May 1816, Paris – 19 May 1870, Paris) was a French dancer and choreographer.

He danced in Lyon in 1841, in Paris from 1843 to 1846, in Brussels from 1847 to 1849. Back in Paris, he remained there until 1853 at least, and then danced in Marseille in 1857 and 1858 at least, in Bordeaux in 1863 and in Madrid the following year. He then left for America, where he performed in Boston in 1867 and New York in 1868.

== Choreographies ==
- undated: Smarra, ou le Démon des mauvais rêves, divertissement
- 1843: Mirza et Almanzor, ballet in 2 acts and 6 tableaux (Lyon)
- 1843: Les Contrebandiers de la Sierra Morena, divertissement in 3 tableaux (Paris, Théâtre des Variétés; two engravings)
- 1848: Une leçon d'amour (Brussels, Théâtre royal de la Monnaie)
- 1849: Les Divinités aériennes (Brussels, Théâtre royal de la Monnaie)
- 1851: Anita ou les Contrebandiers, ballet in 4 tableaux (Paris, Cirque-National)
- 1851: L'Imagier de Harlem by Joseph Méry and Gérard de Nerval, drame-légende extravaganza in 5 acts and 10 tableaux (Paris, Théâtre de la Porte-Saint-Martin; read online)
- 1852: Trois amours d'Anglais, ballet comique in 1 act (Paris, Théâtre de la Porte-Saint-Martin)
- 1857: Les Deux Bouquets, ballet in 1 act and 2 tableaux (Marseille)
- 1858: La Belle Persane, ballet in 2 acts and 4 tableaux (Marseille; read online)
- 1863 : Flore et l'Amour, ballet-divertissement in 1 act (Bordeaux)
- 1864 : Flora y el amor (Madrid)

| Preceded by Hippolyte Barrez | Directeur du Ballet du théâtre de la Monnaie; 1848-1849 | Succeeded by Henri Desplaces |
