= Joseph Méry =

French writer, poet, playwright and librettist (1797–1866)

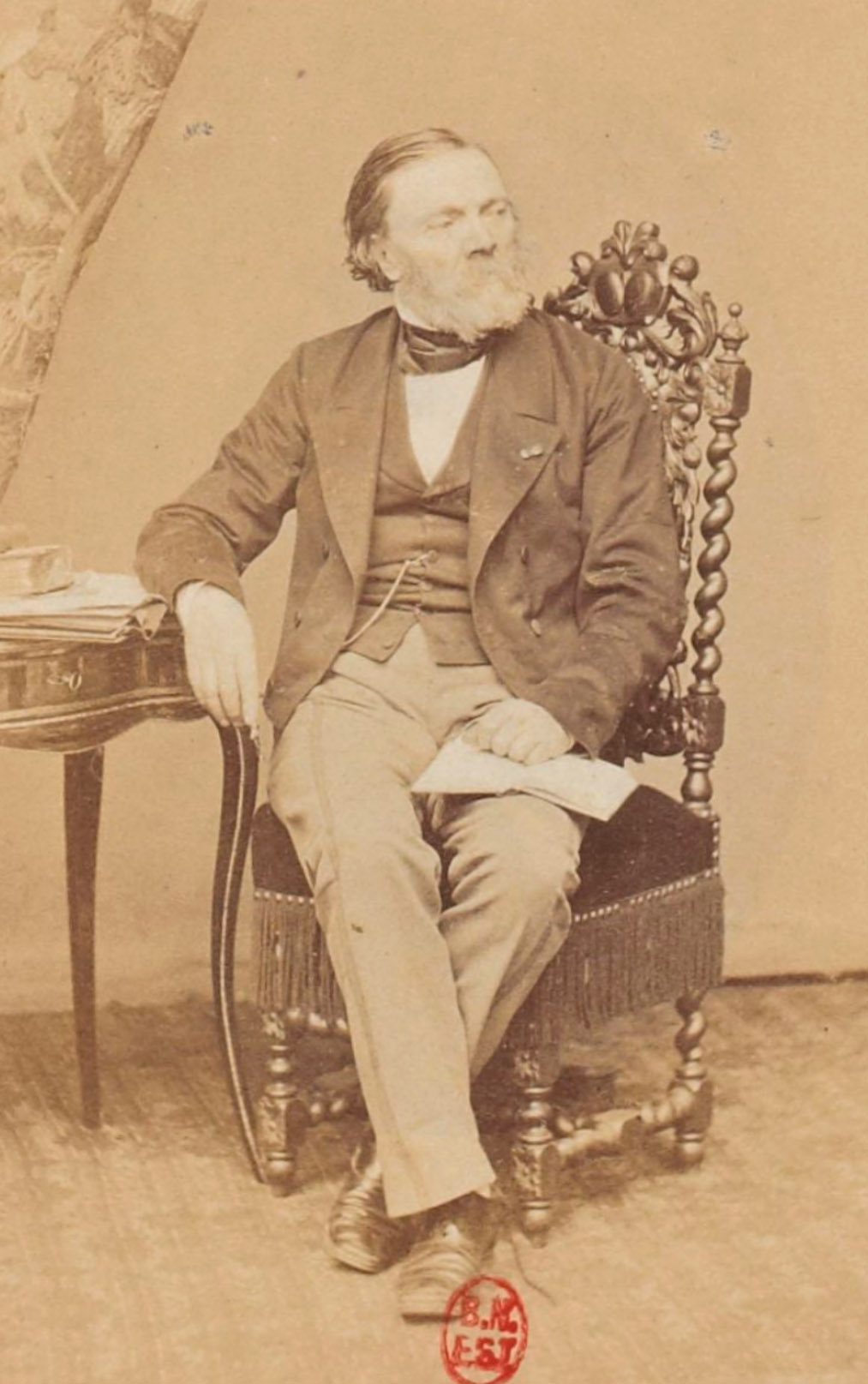
- Born: 21 January 1797; Marseille, France
- Died: 17 June 1866 (aged 69)
- Occupation: Author

Joseph Méry (21 January 1797 – 17 June 1866) was a French writer, journalist, novelist, poet, playwright and librettist.

== Career ==
An ardent romanticist, he collaborated with Auguste Barthélemy in many of his satires and wrote a great number of stories, now forgotten. Nowadays he is perhaps best remembered as the co-librettist of the original version in French of Verdi's Don Carlos, which premiered in Paris in March 1867. Also, he was the author of the play La Bataille de Toulouse which Verdi had earlier adapted for his opera La battaglia di Legnano in January 1849.

He was noted in his time for his wit and ability to improvise. He produced several pieces at the Paris theatres, and also collaborated with Gérard de Nerval in adaptations from Shakespeare and in other plays. A friend of Offenbach, he wrote libretti for three of the composer's works.

His novella Histoire de ce qui n'est pas arrivé (1854) is a significant exercise in alternate history, in which Méry imagined that Napoleon's life took a different turn in Egypt in 1799. It was translated by Brian Stableford in 2012 and is available in a collection of Méry stories entitled The Tower of Destiny.

Alexandre Dumas, père, in 1864, invited all the poets of France to display their skill by composing to sets of Bouts-Rimés selected for the purpose by Joseph Méry. Later in life Méry received a pension from Napoleon III.

== Works ==
=== Novels, short stories and prose ===
- Le Quartier général des jésuites, ou la Ligue à Marseille et à Aix (1829)
- Le Bonnet vert (1830)
- L'Assassinat, scènes méridionales de 1815 (1832)
- Scènes de la vie italienne (2 volumes, 1837)
- Les Nuits de Londres (2 volumes, 1840)
- Un amour dans l'avenir (2 volumes, 1841) Text online 1 2
- Le Siège de Marseille par le connétable de Bourbon, chronique du XVIe (1841)
- Anglais et Chinois (1843) Text online
- La Comtesse Hortensia (1844)
- Héva (1844) Text online
- La Floride (1844) Text online
- L'Éden, mystère en 2 parties (1844)
- La Guerre du Nizam (1847)
- Un mariage de Paris (2 volumes, 1849)
- André Chénier (3 volumes, 1850)
- La Juive au Vatican, ou Amor e Roma (2 volumes, 1851) Text online
- Muses et fées. Histoire des femmes mythologiques, with Louis-Françoi Rabans (1851)
- Salons et souterrains de Paris (3 volumes, 1851)
- Trafalgar (4 volumes, 1852–1853)
- La Ferme de l'Orange (1853) Text online
- Le Dernier Fantôme (1853)
- Nouvelles nouvelles (1853) Text online
- Les Nuits anglaises, contes nocturnes (1853)
- Les Nuits italiennes, contes nocturnes (1853) Text online
- Les Nuits d'Orient, contes nocturnes (1854) Text online
- Les Nuits espagnoles (1854)
- Saint-Pierre de Rome (2 volumes, 1854) Text online 1 2
- Un amour dans le crime (2 volumes, 1854)
- Une histoire de famille (2 volumes, 1854)
- Le Paradis terrestre (2 volumes, 1855)
- Trois bluettes : Le Voile. La Pèlerine. Le Manchon (1855)
- Les Nuits parisiennes (1855)
- Histoire d'une colline (1855)
- Le Bonheur d'un millionnaire (1855)
- Le Château d'Udolphe (1855)
- Les Damnés de Java (3 volumes, 1855)
- Les Matinées du Louvre : paradoxes et rêveries, entretiens de salons (1855)
- Un carnaval de Paris (1856)
- Les Amants du Vésuve (1856)
- La Circé de Paris (2 volumes, 1856)
- Les Deux Amazones (1857)
- Ems et les bords du Rhin (1858)
- Monsieur Auguste (1859)
- Le Château vert (1859)
- Napoléon en Italie (1859)
- Le Château des trois tours (1860)
- Marseille et les Marseillais (1860) Text online
- Contes et nouvelles (1860) Text online
- Ursule (1860)
- Un crime inconnu (1861)
- Une nuit du midi (1862)
- La Comédie des animaux, histoire naturelle en action (1862)
- Les Amours des bords du Rhin (1864)
- Les Uns et les Autres (1864)
- La Vie fantastique (1864)
- La Prima Dona. Précédé du Bonheur des grandes artistes (1866)
- La Chasse au chastre (1860)
- Les Journées de Titus (1866) Text online
- La Vénus d'Arles (1866)
- Les Fleurs mystérieuses (1867)
- Le Château de la favorite (1874)
- Marthe la blanchisseuse. La Vénus d'Arles (1874) Text online
- La Cour d'amour (1875) Text online
- La Comtesse Adrienne (1876)

=== Poetry ===
- 1836: Une revanche de Waterloo, ou Une partie d'échecs, poème héroï-comique
- 1847: L'Arbitre des jeux, accompagné de petits poèmes historiques, Paris, Gabriel de Gonet
- 1853: Mélodies poétiques
- 1858: Les Vierges de Lesbos, poème antique
- 1864: Poésies intimes, mélodies

=== Theatre ===
- 1836: La Bataille de Toulouse, ou un Amour espagnol, three-act drama, in prose, Paris, Théâtre Beaumarchais, 11 April
- 1846: L'Univers et la Maison, comedy in 5 acts and in verse, Paris, Théâtre de l'Odéon, 3 November
- 1847: Le Quinze Janvier, ou Comédiens et parrains, comedy in one act and in verse, Paris, Théâtre de l'Odéon, 15 January
- 1847: Le Paquebot, comedy in 3 acts and in verse, Paris, Théâtre de l'Odéon, 4 April
- 1848: Le Vrai Club des femmes, comedy in 2 acts, in verse, Paris, Comédie-Française, 19 August
- 1850: Une veuve inconsolable, ou Planète et satellites, comédie en 4 actes et en prose, Paris, Théâtre de l'Odéon, 5 April
- 1851: Raphaël, historical comedy in 3 acts, in verse
- 1852: Le Sage et le Fou, three-act comedy, in verse, with Bernard Lopez, Paris, Théâtre-Français, 6 August
- 1853: Gusman le Brave, drama in 5 acts and in verse, Paris, Théâtre de l'Odéon, 19 September
- 1854: Aimons notre prochain, one-act parabole, in prose, Paris, Salle Herz, 2 May
- 1855: L'Essai du mariage, one-act comedy, in prose, Paris, Théâtre-Français, 6 March
- 1855: Frère et Sœur, five-act drama, with Bernard Lopez, Paris, Théâtre de l'Ambigu-Comique, 14 June
- 1858: Les Deux Frontins, one-act comedy, in verse, with Paul Siraudin, Paris, Théâtre-Français, 10 June
- 1864: La Fiancée aux millions, three-act comedy, in verse, with Bernard Lopez, Paris, Théâtre de Belleville, February
- 1861: Théâtre de salon : Après deux ans. La Coquette. Aimons notre prochain. Le Château en Espagne. Être présenté. La Grotte d'azur. Une veuve inconsolable Text online
- 1865: Nouveau théâtre de salon : La Comédie chez soi. Une éducation. Comédiens et diplomates. M. Rousseau. Gloire et amour. Le Récit de Théramène. La Soubrette de Clairon. Le Prix de famille

=== Librettos ===
- 1854: Ernest Reyer: Maître Wolfram, one-act opéra comique
- 1855: Jacques Offenbach: Le décaméron, ou La grotte d'azur; Entrez, messieurs, mesdames; Trafalgar – Sur un volcan (one-act comic operas)
- 1859: Félicien David: Herculanum, four-act opera
- 1860: Gioachino Rossini: Semiramide, four-act opera
- 1862: Ernest Reyer: Érostrate, two-act opera, with Émilien Pacini
- 1865: G. Duprez: Jeanne d'Arc, five-act opera, with prologue, with Édouard Duprez
- 1867: Giuseppe Verdi: Don Carlos, five-act opera, with Camille Du Locle

==== Publications in collaboration with Auguste Barthélemy ====
- 1825: Sidiennes, épîtres-satires sur le dix-neuvième siècle
- 1826: Biographie des quarante de l'Académie française
- 1826: Les Jésuites, épître à M. le président Séguier
- 1826: La Villéliade ou la prise du château Rivoli. Poème héroï-comique en cinq chants Text online
- 1827: Une soirée chez M. de Peyronnet ou le seize avril. Scène dramatique
- 1827: La Censure, scène historique
- 1827: Rome à Paris, poème en 4 chants
- 1827: Le Congrès des ministres, ou la Revue de la garde nationale : scènes historiques Text online
- 1827: Peyronnéide, épître à M. de Peyronnet
- 1827: La Corbiéréide, poème en 4 chants Text online
- 1827: La Bacriade, ou la Guerre d'Alger, poème héroï-comique en 5 chants
- 1828: Napoléon en Égypte, poème en 8 chants
- 1829: Le Fils de l'homme, ou Souvenirs de Vienne
- 1829: Waterloo. Au général de Bourmont
- 1830: L'Insurrection, poème dédié aux parisiens
- 1831: Œuvres de Barthélemy et Méry
- 1834: Les Aygalades et Fontainieu

==== Publications in collaboration with Gérard de Nerval ====
- 1850: Le Chariot d'enfant drama in verse, in 5 acts and 7 tableaux, traduction du drame indien du Roi Soudraka Text online
- 1852: L'Imagier de Harlem, ou la Découverte de l'imprimerie, drame-légende à grand spectacle, in 5 acts and 10 tableaux, in prose and in verse, with Gérard de Nerval and Bernard Lopez, ballets by Adrien Text online

== Bibliography ==
- Kilien Stengel, Les Poètes de la bonne chère, Anthologie de poésie gastronomique, Collection Petite Vermillon Éditions de la Table ronde (groupe Gallimard), 2008. ISBN 2710330733
- Eugène de Mirecourt, Méry (1858) Text online
- Gustave Claudin, Méry : sa vie intime, anecdotique et littéraire (1868) Text online

== See also ==
- Antoine Rey-Dussueil
- A Correct Transcript of Pilate's Court, an American 1879 pamphlet by William Dennes Mahan plagiarized from Méry's Ponce Pilate à Vienne.
