= Beskow =

Beskow is a Swedish family of German origin, taking its name from the town of Beeskow in Prussia. The first member to settle in the Swedish realm was the tailor alderman Arendt Beskow (1718–1790) in Stralsund in what was then Swedish Pomerania.

There are many U.S. Beskows who are not of Swedish descent. One group of German Beskows settled in South Dakota and were staunch anti-abolitionist store owners during the 1850s.

There are also US Beskows who are not of Swedish descent. One group of Norwegian Beskows settled in Wisconsin and still live there today.

== Notable members of this family ==
- Bernhard von Beskow (1796–1868), poet, playwright, courtier, permanent secretary of the Swedish Academy, created a baron in 1843
- Gustaf Emanuel Beskow (1834–1899), theologian and educator
- Bernhard August Beskow (1837–1910), engraver
- Natanael Beskow (1865–1953), theologian
- Elsa Beskow (1874–1953), author and illustrator of children's books (married to Natanael B.)
- Bo Beskow (1906–1988), painter (son of Elsa and Natanael B.)
- Per Beskow (1926−2016), Swedish biblical scholar
- Katarina Beskow (1867–1939), chess player

== Other notable individuals with this surname ==
- Saskia Beskow, former New York City Ballet dancer
