= Jesus: The Evidence =

1984 TV Mini Series in United Kingdom

Jesus: The Evidence is a three-part television miniseries made by London Weekend Television (LWT) for Channel 4, and transmitted in the UK in 1984 over the Easter period (Ep.1 - 8 April 1984; Ep.2 -15 April 1984; and Ep.3 - 22 April 1984).

== Production ==
The series was the first major religious commission by the UK’s newly established fourth channel, and signalled a major departure from the largely non-critical approach to religious subject-matter that had been established from the earliest days of the BBC. In setting itself up to be deliberately provocative, questioning and speculative, the series sparked a furore, and marked a significant moment in the deterioration in the relationship between the Christian churches, and the UK's broadcasting institutions. The series' content referenced a range of popularized treatments of the search for the ‘real’ Jesus, including Hugh Schonfield’s The Passover Plot, and Morton Smith’s Jesus the Magician.

The idea for the series was sparked by an article about The Gnostic Gospels, an award-winning book by the American scholar Elaine Pagels, which was previewed in The Sunday Times in December 1979, tweaking the interest of John Birt who at that time was Director of Programmes at LWT. An accompanying book, also titled Jesus: The Evidence, was published in conjunction with the series; it was written by Ian Wilson, who also appeared as an interviewee.

The series featured a number of notable scholars, including Helmut Koester, Werner Kümmel, Dennis Nineham, Morton Smith, I Howard Marshall, George A Wells, and Géza Vermes.

The show was narrated by the actor Jeremy Kemp, researched by Jean-Claude Bragard, produced and directed by David W. Rolfe, executive produced by Jane Hewland, and series produced by Julian Norridge.

== Controversy ==
The series became the focus of a campaign of protest led by the Evangelical youth magazine, Buzz, which drew wide support from across many sections of the churches (particularly the Evangelical and Catholic wings). One leading commentator noted that what the series demonstrated was the way in which Channel 4 was "not so much the last of the main public service channels to arrive, as the first swallow heralding the broadcasting pluralism of cable and satellite". According to Bonner and Aston (2003):

The producers did not help themselves either by including a statue of Christ that symbolically exploded in slow-motion. Originally intended to illustrate a point made by Albert Schweitzer, it became a sort of visual punctuation mark used several times in the first and second programmes, causing genuine offence to some.

Henry Chadwick, then Regius Professor of Divinity at the University of Cambridge, commented that the programmes "juxtaposed perfectly sensible scholarly opinions with opinions so outré and hard to defend on rational grounds that disservice was done to the sensible people by the company they were portrayed as keeping".

== See also ==
- Gnostic Gospels
