= Morton Smith =

American historian and academic (1915–1991)

Robert Morton Smith
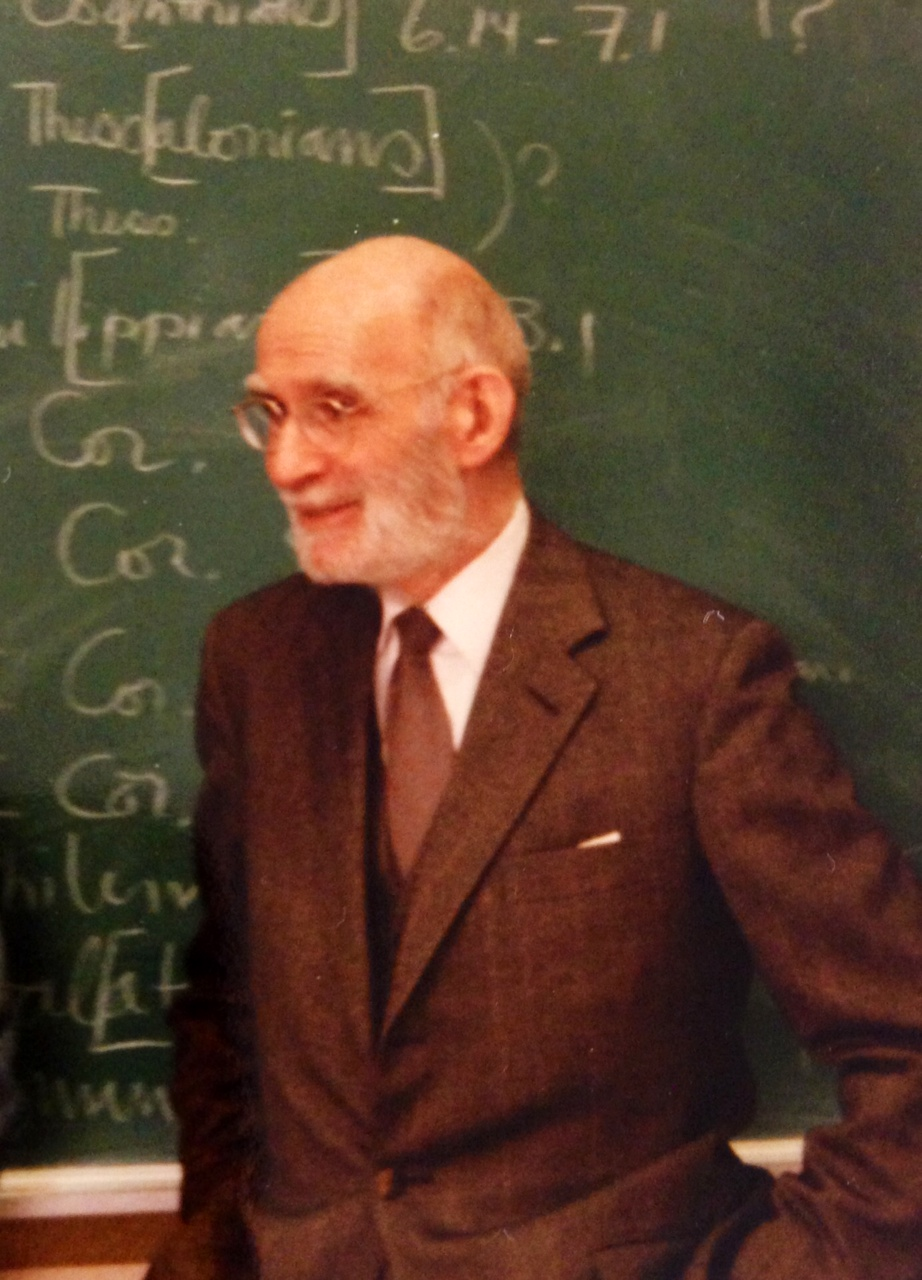
- Morton Smith, teaching a graduate seminar on Paul at Columbia University in 1989.
- Born: May 28, 1915; Philadelphia, Pennsylvania, U.S.
- Died: July 11, 1991 (aged 76); Manhattan, New York, U.S.
- Occupation: Historian

Academic background
- Education: Harvard University; Hebrew University (Ph.D.); Harvard Divinity School (Th.D.)

Academic work
- Discipline: Biblical scholar
- Institutions: Columbia University
- Main interests: Mar Saba letter
- Notable works: Jesus the Magician

Robert Morton Smith (May 28, 1915 – July 11, 1991) was an American professor of ancient history at Columbia University. He is best known for his reported discovery of the Mar Saba letter, a letter attributed to Clement of Alexandria containing excerpts from a Secret Gospel of Mark, during a visit to the monastery at Mar Saba in 1958. This letter fragment has had many names, from The Secret Gospel through The Mar Saba Fragment and the Theodoros.

== Biography ==
Smith was born in Philadelphia on May 28, 1915. He attended the Academy of the New Church. He received his A.B. in English magna cum laude from Harvard College in 1936 and Bachelor of Sacred Theology (S.T.B.) from Harvard Divinity School in 1940. Smith received a Ph.D. in classical philology from Hebrew University in Jerusalem in 1948 and a Th.D. from Harvard Divinity School in 1957. He was ordained deacon (1945) and priest (1946) of the Episcopal Diocese of Maryland and worked in parishes until 1950.

He taught at Brown University (1950–55), Drew University (1955–56) and Columbia University from 1957. He became professor emeritus in 1985 and continued as a lecturer in religion until 1990.

On July 11, 1991, Smith died in his home at the age of 76 due to heart failure. Other sources have reported the cause of death to be suicide. At the time of his death Smith was working on a project titled Paul the Possessed.

Smith was well known for his sharp wit when it came to religious debates. He made regular scholarly contributions in many fields, including but not limited to Greek and Latin classics, New Testament, Patristics, Second Temple Judaism, and Rabbinic Judaism. Despite the numerous accusations of forgery against Smith's finding, Smith was seen as a dedicated scholar when it came to research. He devoted fifteen years of his life to just studying his finding of the Secret Gospel.

== Mar Saba letter ==
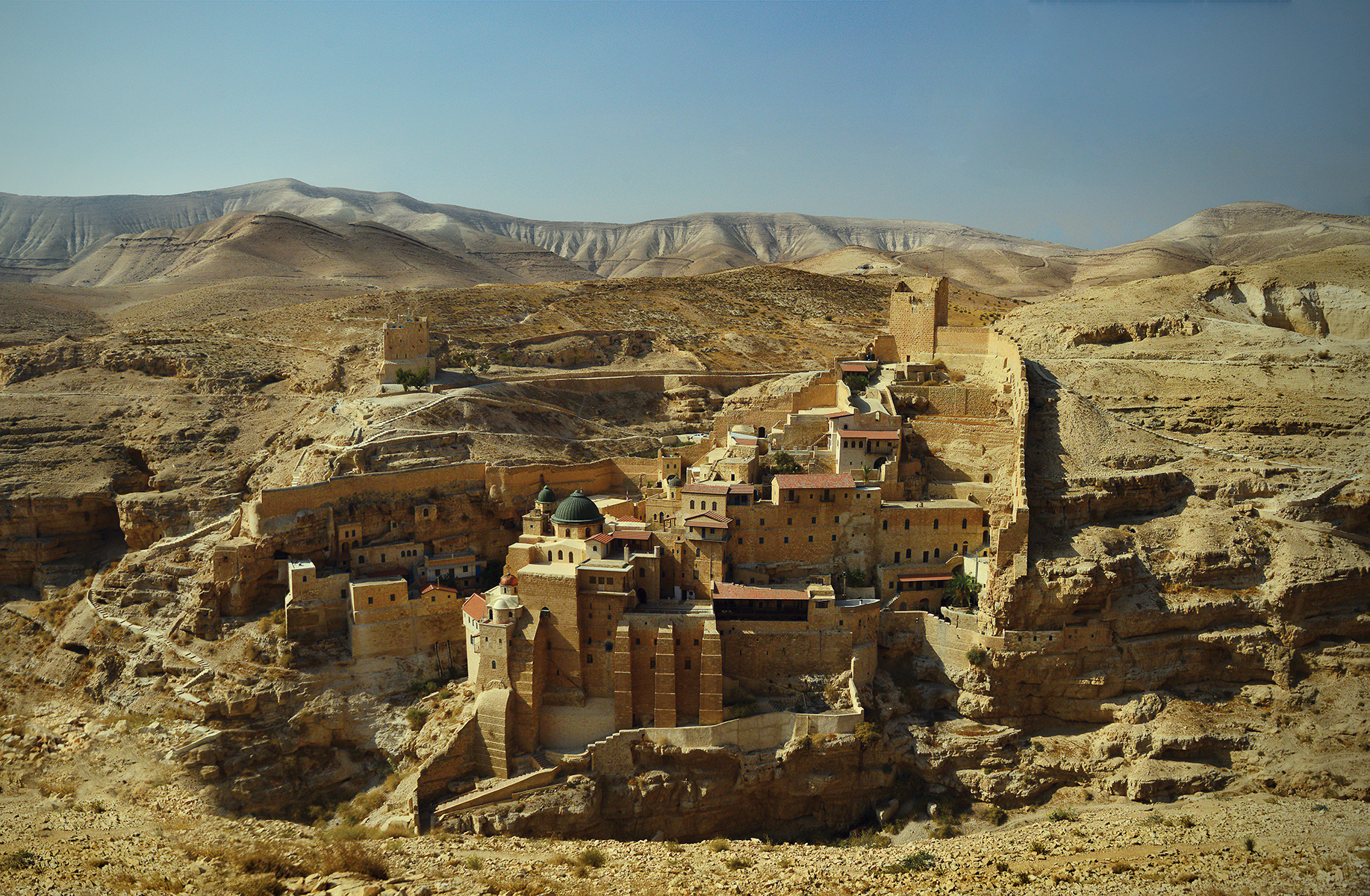
Ancient Mar Saba monastery, founded in the fifth century.

In 1941, Smith, at age 26, was on a trip to the holy land with the Harvard Divinity School. Due to issues relating to the war, he was stuck in Jerusalem, where he made acquaintances with a leader of the Greek Orthodox Church, who gave him a tour of various places, one of which happened to be the Mar Saba monastery. While there, Smith was given access to the libraries of the monastery. Years later, in 1958, having landed a teaching career at Columbia, Smith was awarded a sabbatical. With his sabbatical, Smith decided to return to Mar Saba, having since become very interested in the Mar Saba library. He recalled that during his first visit, the library had been a terrible mess, and according to Smith no one had bothered to catalog it.

Smith reported he found the manuscript in the Mar Saba monastery in 1958, photographed it carefully, and then left the book where he found it. He first publicized the discovery in 1960 but, due to various delays, his main publications on the subject did not come out until 1973.

Mar Saba is a Greek Orthodox monastery overlooking the Kidron Valley in the West Bank east of Bethlehem. In 1973 Smith published a book in which he wrote that he had discovered a previously unknown letter of Clement of Alexandria (c.150 - c. 215) while cataloging documents there in the summer of 1958.

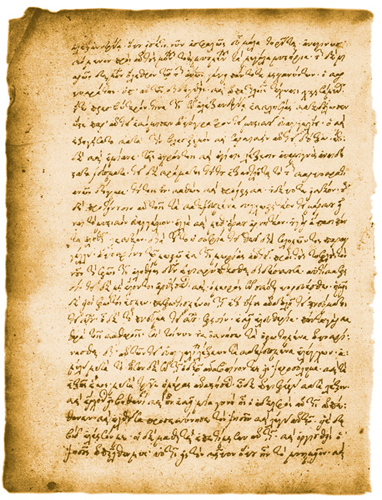
Color photo of page 2 of the Mar Saba letter in which quotations from the Secret Gospel of Mark are made.

Right from the start, some scholars voiced the opinion that the letter is not authentic, and that it was either an ancient or medieval forgery. In 1975, Quentin Quesnell published a lengthy article in the Catholic Biblical Quarterly, where he suggested that Smith had forged the document himself, and then photographed his alleged forgery. An incensed Smith issued a furious rebuttal, whereupon Quesnell disclaimed any personal accusations against Smith.

In 1985 in his Strange Tales Per Beskow of Lund University cast doubt on the Gospel. Smith responded by threatening to sue the publisher, Fortress Press of Philadelphia, "for a million dollars" and the publisher amended the offending paragraph.

Smith is featured discussing the Mar Saba letter in the 1984 Channel 4 documentary, Jesus: The Evidence.

== Contribution to Old Testament studies ==
Smith's contribution to Old Testament studies was contained in his Palestinian Parties and Politics That Shaped the Old Testament (1971). Using form criticism to reconstruct the social background to the Old Testament, Smith advanced the proposal that two parties had vied for supremacy in ancient Israel, the first composed of those which worshipped many gods of which Yahweh was chief, while the other, the "Yahweh-alone" faction, was largely the party of the priests of Jerusalem, who wished to establish a monopoly for Yahweh. In monarchic Judah the Yahweh-alone party were a permanent minority; although sometimes able to win over a king like Josiah to their cause. Meanwhile, the population at large, including most of the kings, remained stubbornly polytheistic, worshipping the same gods as their neighbours in Moab, Ammon etc. In the post-Exilic period the idea of Yahweh as the only god of Israel finally triumphed, but a new division emerged, between the separatists, who wished the Jews to remain strictly apart from their neighbours, (this separation being defined in terms of purity), and the assimilationists who wished for normal relations with them. Ultimately, by the late Persian/early Hellenistic period, the purists won, the modern version of the Hebrew Bible was written, and a recognisably modern Judaism emerged.

Smith was admired and feared for his extraordinary ability to look at familiar texts in unfamiliar ways, to re-open old questions, to pose new questions, and to demolish received truths. He practiced the "hermeneutics of suspicion" to devastating effect. His answers are not always convincing but his questions cannot be ignored.

— Shaye J. D. Cohen

== Publications ==
Books

- Smith, Morton (1951). Tannaitic Parallels to the Gospels. JBL Monograph Series. Vol. 6. Philadelphia: Society of Biblical Literature – via Open Library.
- Smith, Morton (1960). The Ancient Greeks. Ithaca, NY: Cornell University Press – via Open Library.
- Hadas, Moses; Smith, Morton (1965). Heroes and Gods: Spiritual Biographies in Antiquity. Religious Perspectives. Vol. 13. Fereport, NY: Books for Libraries Press. ISBN 0-8369-1880-0 – via Open Library.
- Smith, Morton (1971). Palestinian Parties and Politics That Shaped the Old Testament. Columbia University Press. ISBN 0-231-02986-1 – via Open Library.
- Smith, Morton (1973). Clement of Alexandria and a Secret Gospel of Mark. Harvard University Press. ISBN 0-674-13490-7.
- Smith, Morton (1973). The Secret Gospel the discovery and interpretation of the Secret Gospel according to Mark. New York: Harper & Row. ISBN 0-06-067411-3 – via Open Library.
- Bickerman, Elias; Smith, Morton (1976). The Ancient History of Western Civilization. New York: Harper & Row. ISBN 0-06-040668-2 – via Open Library.
- Smith, Morton (1978). Jesus the Magician: Charlatan or Son of God?. New York: Harper & Row. ISBN 0-06-067412-1 – via Open Library.
- Smith, Morton (1980). Hope and History, an Exploration. World Perspectives. Vol. 54. New York: Harper & Row. ISBN 0-06-013991-9 – via Open Library.
- Smith, Morton; Hoffmann, R. Joseph, eds. (1989). What the Bible Really Says. San Francisco: Prometheus Books. ISBN 9780879754686 – via Open Library.

Papers

Collected in Studies in the Cult of Yahweh [edited by Shaye J. D. Cohen] (Brill, Religions in the Graeco-Roman world, v. 130)

- Smith, Morton; Cohen, Shaye J. D. (November 1995). Historical Method, Ancient Israel, Ancient Judaism. Vol. 1. doi:10.1163/9789004295872. ISBN 978-90-04-10477-8 – via Open Library.
- Smith, Morton; Cohen, Shaye J.D. (February 1996). New Testament, Early Christianity, and Magic. Vol. 2. doi:10.1163/9789004301443. ISBN 978-90-04-10479-2 – via Open Library.

== Awards ==
- Lionel Trilling Book Award for Jesus the Magician: Charlatan or Son of God?
- Ralph Marcus Centennial Award of the Society of Biblical Literature

== Sources ==
- Brown, Scott G. (2005). Mark's Other Gospel: Rethinking Morton Smith's Controversial Discovery. Studies in Christianity and Judaism. Vol. 15. Wilfrid Laurier University Press. ISBN 9780889209237.
- Brown, Scott G. (July 2006). "Factualizing the Folklore: Stephen Carlson's case against Morton Smith". Harvard Theological Review. 99 (3). Cambridge University Press: 291–327. doi:10.1017/S001781600600126X. JSTOR 4125225.
- Carlson, Stephen C. (2005). The Gospel Hoax: Morton Smith's Invention of Secret Mark. Baylor University Press. ISBN 9781932792485.
- Ehrman, Bart D. (2003). Lost Christianities. Oxford University Press. ISBN 978-0-19-518249-1.
- Hedrick, Charles W.; Olympiou, Nikolaos (September–October 2000). "The Secret Gospel of Mark: New Photographs of the Missing Manuscript". The Fourth R. 13 (5). Westar Institute: 3–16. ISSN 0893-1658. Archived from the original on 2012-06-25.
- Jeffery, Peter (2007). The Secret Gospel of Mark Unveiled: Imagined Rituals of Sex, Death, and Madness in a Biblical Forgery. Yale University Press. ISBN 978-0-300-11760-8.
- Stroumsa, Gedaliahu A. G. (Summer 2003). "Comments on Charles Hedrick's Article: A Testimony". Journal of Early Christian Studies. 11 (22): 147–153. doi:10.1353/earl.2003.0035. Project MUSE 43653 – via academia.edu.
