= The Archko Volume =

19th-century American book claimed to be a translation of ancient writings about Jesus

The Archko Volume or Archko Library is a 19th-century volume containing what purports to be a series of reports from Jewish and pagan sources contemporary with Jesus that relate to the biblical texts describing his life. The work went through a number of versions and has remained in print ever since. The texts are otherwise unknown, and the author was convicted by an ecclesiastical court of falsehood and plagiarism.

The Archko Volume is regarded by some religious scholars as fraudulent. The scholar M. R. James, as he described the work as a "ridiculous and disgusting American book."

In 1879, the Rev. William Dennes Mahan, a Cumberland Presbyterian minister of Boonville, Missouri, published a pamphlet of thirty-two pages entitled A Correct Transcript of Pilate's Court. It purported to be an official report of the trial and death of Jesus made directly to the Roman Emperor Tiberius by Pilate as governor of Judaea. Mahan claimed the text was supplied to him in 1856 by a German scholar, Henry C. Whydaman, from Father Peter Freelinhusen, "the chief guardian of the Vatican," who sent the Latin text to Whydaman’s brother-in-law, C. C. Vantberger of New York, for English translation. Whydaman, Freelinhusen, and Vantberger are otherwise unknown, and the documentation of the exchange contains inconsistencies and errors, including Freelinhusen’s request for a fee payable in "darics" (ancient Persian coins).

This work was subsequently shown to have been copied almost verbatim from "Ponce Pilate à Vienne," a short story by Joseph Méry published in Revue de Paris in 1837. Méry said he had been inspired by an old Latin manuscript, and an 1842 English translation of the story made the claim that it was in fact taken from an old Latin manuscript. Mahan’s contribution was evidently to create correspondence showing him to be the discoverer of the manuscript.

== Contents ==
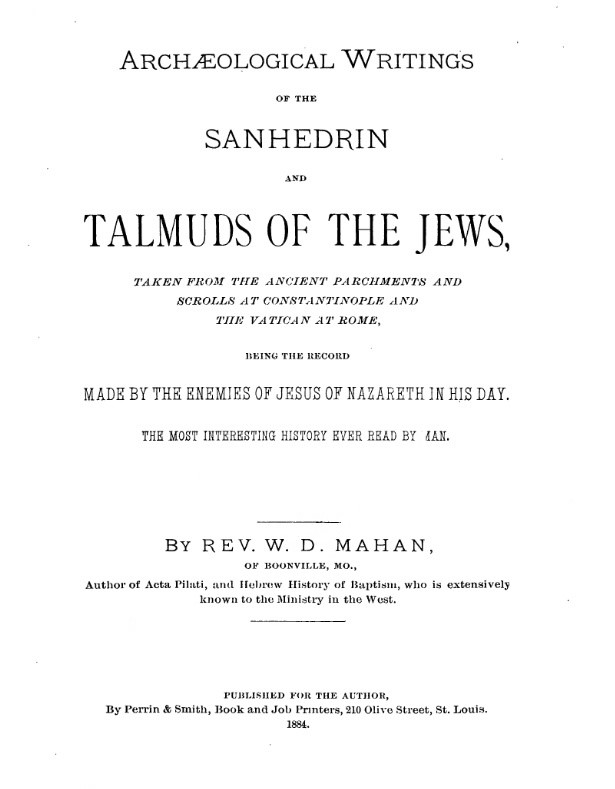
Title page of the first edition of Archaeological Writings of the Sanhedrin and Talmuds of the Jews [etc.], 1884.

In 1884 Mahan published the first version of the Archko Volume, entitled Archaeological Writings of the Sanhedrin and Talmuds of the Jews, Taken from the Ancient Parchments and Scrolls at Constantinople and the Vatican at Rome, Being the Record Made by the Enemies of Jesus of Nazareth in His Day: The Most Interesting History Ever Read by Man. This included an expanded version of "Pilate's Court" plus a series of other texts that he claimed to have obtained himself in a visit to Rome and Constantinople and translated with the aid of M. McIntosh of Scotland and Twyman of England, also otherwise unheard of. These texts include interviews with the shepherds, Gamaliel's interview with Joseph and Mary, Caiaphas's reports to the Sanhedrin, "Eli's story of the Magi", Herod Antipater's defense before the Roman Senate for the Massacre of the Innocents, and Herod Antipas's defense before the Senate—all with the claim that they were copied from ancient manuscripts and translated into English.

The texts are otherwise unknown to scholarship, and the volume contains various inconsistencies. It quotes an unknown Greek philosopher, "Meeleesen," and includes references to Josephus that do not exist. It mistakenly asserts that Philo spoke often of Jesus and that "the scribes of those days were most all Rabbis." There are inaccurate descriptions of the library of the Hagia Sophia in Constantinople, the making of papyrus, and an inaccurate chronology for both Philo of Alexandria and Tacitus. Contemporaries raised the question of whether Mahan could have possibly made the trip to Rome and Constantinople in less than two months. Most tellingly, large portions of "Eli's Story of the Magi" were copied verbatim from the 1880 novel Ben-Hur: A Tale of the Christ. At one point, a strange word reveals that a single line of the printed text of Ben-Hur has accidentally been omitted during copying.

== Legacy ==
Mahan was summoned before church authorities in September 1885 on charges of falsehood and plagiarism. Lew Wallace, American minister to Turkey and author of Ben-Hur, testified that no record of Mahan’s visit to Turkey or to the library of the Hagia Sophia existed, and that the primary sources he cited were unknown. Mahan was convicted and suspended from the ministry for one year. He promised to withdraw the book from publication. However, the book was reprinted many times from 1887 onward by various publishers, because U.S. copyright laws were lax during this period. The title Archko Volume appeared during this period, as did the note "Second edition". This second edition omits "Eli and the Story of the Magi" and also creates a preface using material from the introductions to the texts. No new original material is included, which suggests that this version was produced by a publisher's clerk. The omission of the Eli text suggests that the court verdict was known to the reviser. As of 2016, modern reprints of the book were still being offered for sale on Amazon.com and other sites.

The circumstances of composition, the letters to the Boonville Advertiser, and the proceedings of the church court were all investigated by Edgar J. Goodspeed and published in his books Strange New Gospels (1931) and Modern Apocrypha (1956), and by Prof. Richard Lloyd Anderson in an article in the Brigham Young University Studies. More recently, Per Beskow (1983) has identified Mahan's original sources and reported on subsequent editions of the Archko Volume.
