= Jesus the Magician =

1978 book by Morton Smith

- First edition
- Author: Morton Smith
- Subject: Historical Jesus
- Publisher: Harper & Row
- Publication date: 1978
- Pages: 222 pp.
- ISBN: 978-0-06-067412-0
- OCLC: 3273846

Jesus the Magician is a 1978 book by Morton Smith arguing that the historical Jesus was a magician who "sprang from a Galilean strain of Semitic paganism" (p. 68).

== Background ==
The idea that Jesus was a magician did not originate with Morton Smith. It was previously voiced by the philosopher and critic Celsus (The True Word c. 200 CE) as we know from the rebuttal authored by the Christian apologist/scholar Origen: "It was by magic that he was able to do the miracles" (Contra Celsum 1.6). Hans Dieter Betz (1994) observes that "from early on even Jesus of Nazareth was implicated in that he was said to be mad or a magician possessed by Satan" and R. Joseph Hoffmann writes (1987) that it is well attested that "the early Christian mission was advanced by the use of magic."

Smith was featured discussing his theories in the controversial television documentary series, Jesus: The Evidence (1984: LWT for Channel 4).

== Reception ==
Bart Ehrman referred to the book as "uncannily smart, incredibly learned" in the preface for the 2014 edition of the book. Kirkus Reviews describes the book as "carefully researched, elegantly written, and thoroughly prejudiced."

Barry Crawford (Vanderbilt University) wrote in his 1979 review that "Smith exhibits an intricate knowledge of the magical papyri, but his ignorance of current Gospel research is abysmal."

== Editions ==
- Harper & Row (1978), ISBN 978-0-06-067412-0.
- Barnes & Noble Books (1993), ISBN 1-56619-285-4.
- Ulysses Press (1998), ISBN 978-1-56975-155-8.

== Sources ==
- Hans Dieter Betz, "The Birth of Christianity as a Hellenistic Religion: Three Theories of Origin," The Journal of Religion 74 (1994), pp. 1–25
- Barry Crawford, Journal of the American Academy of Religion (1979), 321–322.
- Celsus, On the True Doctrine. A Discourse Against the Christians tr. by R. Joseph Hoffmann (1987), p. 53 n3.
- William G. Dever, Did God Have a Wife? Archaeology and Folk Religion in Ancient Israel (2005), 4.
- H. S. Versnel, "Some Reflections on the Relationship Magic-Religion," Numen 38 (1991), pp. 177–197.
- Jennifer Viegas, "Earliest reference describes Christ as 'magician'" October 1, 2008. https://www.nbcnews.com/id/wbna26972493 Accessed November 2, 2009.
