= Gospel of Josephus =

Modern forgery created by Luigi Moccia in 1927

The Gospel of Josephus was a modern pseudepigraph created by Luigi Moccia to raise publicity for a novel Moccia had written. The manuscript was written by Moccia in Greek, but was proven to be a hoax based on the modernity of the language and the form of the manuscript (loose sheets written on one side only). The Gospel was attributed to Flavius Josephus, a Jewish historian of the first century CE. The gospel was created in 1927.

== See also ==
- Josephus on Jesus
- List of Gospels
