= Gospel of Jesus' Wife =

Forged papyrus fragment

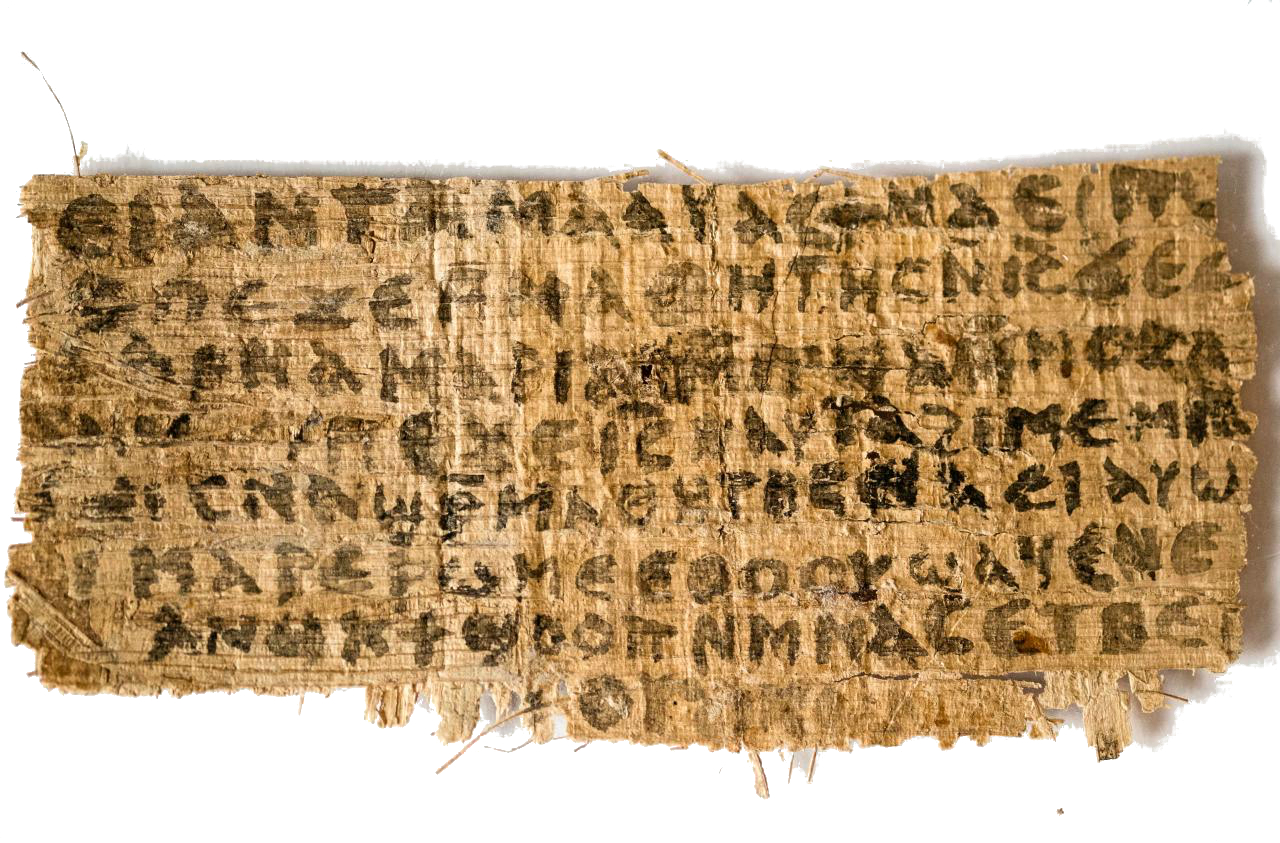
Gospel of Jesus' Wife, recto

The Gospel of Jesus' Wife is a forged papyrus fragment with Coptic text that includes the words, "Jesus said to them, 'my wife...'". Though initially dated to the 4th century, it is now regarded as a modern forgery. The text received widespread attention when first publicized in 2012 for the implication that some early Christians believed that Jesus was married.

The fragment was first presented by Harvard Divinity School Professor Karen L. King, who suggested that the papyrus contained a fourth-century Coptic translation of a gospel likely composed in Greek in the late second century. Following an investigative Atlantic article by Ariel Sabar published online in June 2016, King conceded that the evidence now "presses in the direction of forgery."

The fragment's provenance and similarity to another fragment from the same anonymous owner widely believed to be fake further supported a consensus among scholars that the text is a modern forgery written on a scrap of medieval papyrus.

== Publication ==
After Professor Karen King's announcement of the existence of a papyrus fragment featuring the words "Jesus said to them, 'my wife...'" at the International Congress of Coptic Studies in Rome on September 18, 2012, scholarly publication of the text with commentary was slated for the Harvard Theological Review in January 2013. On January 3, 2013, King and Kathryn Dodgson (director of communications for Harvard Divinity School) confirmed to CNN that publication was being delayed pending the results of (in Dodgson's words) "further testing and analysis of the fragment, including testing by independent laboratories with the resources and specific expertise necessary to produce and interpret reliable results." A revised version of the article appeared in the Harvard Theological Review in April 2014, together with several scientific reports on the testing of the papyrus.

In response to Ariel Sabar's article in The Atlantic, the Harvard Theological Review issued a statement saying that it had never committed itself to the authenticity of the papyrus and refused to print a retraction of King's article. Retraction Watch called the journal's decision "a cop-out of...Biblical proportions."

== Text ==
One side of the fragmentary text reads, word-for-word:

[...] not [to] me. My mother gave me life [...] The disciples said to Jesus, [...] deny. Mary is (not?) worthy of it. [...] Jesus said to them, "My wife [...] she is able to be my disciple [...] Let wicked people swell up [...] As for me, I am with her in order to [...] an image [...]

The opposite side of the text reads, word-for-word:

[...] my moth[er] [...] three [...] forth [...]

The next two lines of this side feature illegible ink traces.

== Features ==
The fragment is rectangular, approximately 4 by 8 centimetres (1.6 in × 3.1 in). According to reports, "the fragment has eight incomplete lines of writing on one side and is badly damaged on the other side, with only three faded words and a few letters of ink that are visible, even with the use of infrared photography and computer-aided enhancement."

King and AnneMarie Luijendijk, an associate professor of religion at Princeton University, named the fragment the "Gospel of Jesus's Wife" for reference purposes but have since acknowledged that the name was inflammatory. Asked about her handling of the public disclosure of the fragment, King admitted that she had "misjudged just how inflammatory that title would turn out to be". According to Tom Bartlett of The Chronicle of Higher Education, "she's been asking around for ideas on a new, less exciting name". They further suggested the text was written by Egyptian Christians before AD 400; it is in the language they believed was used by those people at that time. They considered that the papyrus fragment comes from a codex, rather than a scroll, as text appears on both sides. King has stated that the fragment should not be taken as proof that the historical Jesus was married. Testing has dated the papyrus itself to somewhere between the seventh and ninth century, and Professor Christian Askeland of Indiana Wesleyan University has shown that the text is written in Lycopolitan, a Coptic dialect that fell out of use during or prior to the sixth century.

With reference to the speculative source of the text on the fragment, King and Luijendijk used the term gospel in a capacious sense, as it includes all early Christian writings about Jesus' career.

== Initial interpretations of the text ==
King told the International Congress of Coptic Studies that the text does not prove that Jesus had a wife. She noted that even as a translation of a 2nd-century AD Greek text, it would still have been written more than 100 years after the death of Jesus. According to King, the earliest and most reliable information about Jesus is silent on the question of his marital status. King also said that the text (which she suggested is a fragment from a non-canonical gospel) showed that some early Christians believed that Jesus was married. A Harvard News Office article reported that King dated the speculative Greek original to the second half of the second century because it shows close connections to other newly discovered gospels written at that time, particularly the Gospel of Thomas, the Gospel of Mary, and the Gospel of Philip.

King later, in a 2012 television documentary, commented on the possible implication of the papyrus fragment:

The question on many people's minds is whether this fragment should lead us to re-think whether Jesus was married. I think, however, what it leads us to do, is not to answer that question one way or the other, it should lead us to re-think how Christianity understood sexuality and marriage in a very positive way, and to recapture the pleasures of sexuality, the joyfulness and the beauties of human intimate relations.

Ben Witherington, Professor of New Testament Interpretation at the Asbury Theological Seminary, said that while the text might contribute to the study of Gnosticism in the 2nd or 4th century, it should not be considered significant for those studying Jesus in a 1st-century historical context. He further explained that, "during the rise of the monastic movement, you had quite a lot of monk-type folks and evangelists who travelled in the company of a sister-wife" and that the term "wife" was open to interpretation.

Father Henry Wansbrough echoed the same sentiments:

It will not have a great deal of importance for the Christian church. It will show that there was a group who had these beliefs in the second century—Christians or semi-Christians—who perhaps had not reflected enough on the implications of the canonical scriptures—to see that Jesus could not have been married. It's a historical interest, rather than a faith interest.

Daniel B. Wallace of the Dallas Theological Seminary and others have suggested that the fragment appears to have been intentionally cut, most likely in modern times. They further suggest that this leads to the possibility that in context Jesus may not have even been speaking of a literal wife.

=== Links to conspiracy theories ===
The modern idea that Jesus was married is largely attributable to The Holy Blood and the Holy Grail, a book by Baigent, Leigh, and Lincoln that is considered a work of pseudohistory that relies on conspiracy theories. Its thesis was that Jesus had been married to Mary Magdalene, and that the legends of the Holy Grail were symbolic accounts of his bloodline in Europe. This thesis became much more widely circulated after it was made the center of the plot of The Da Vinci Code, a best-selling 2003 novel by author Dan Brown. King rejected any link between The Da Vinci Code and the Gospel of Jesus' Wife.

=== Other text ===
The fragment also includes the line, "she will be able to be my disciple". The New York Times states that debates over whether Jesus married Mary Magdalene or another woman, as well as debates over whether or not he had female disciples can be traced to the early centuries of Christianity. King, however, contends that, prior to the recently published papyrus fragment, no texts exist which claim that Jesus was married, but that the canonical gospels clearly imply that Jesus had female disciples.

== Provenance ==
Until June 2016, nothing definite was known about the provenance of the papyrus. Before the appearance of Ariel Sabar's article, it was reported that an anonymous owner had acquired the fragment in 1997 as part of a cache of papyri and other documents. This cache was said to have been purchased from a German-American collector who, in turn, had acquired it in the 1960s in East Germany. Among the other documents in that cache were: (a) a type-written letter dated July 15, 1982 addressed to one Hans-Ulrich Laukamp from Prof. Dr. Peter Munro (Ägyptologisches Seminar, Freie Universität Berlin) which only mentions one of the papyri, reporting that a colleague, Prof. Fecht, had identified it as a 2nd–4th-century AD fragment of the Gospel of John in Coptic, and giving recommendations as to its preservation; and (b) an undated and unsigned hand-written note in German and seemingly referring to the Gospel of Jesus' Wife fragment. According to this note, "Professor Fecht" believed it to be the only instance of a text in which Jesus uses direct speech to refer to a wife. Professor Gerhard Fecht was on the faculty of Egyptology at the Free University of Berlin. Laukamp died in 2001, Fecht in 2006 and Munro in 2009.

In June 2016, journalist Ariel Sabar published an article in The Atlantic which identified the owner of the Gospel of Jesus' Wife papyrus as Walter Fritz, a German immigrant living in Florida. The article discredited the story that Fritz told King about the fragment's history, including its alleged former ownership by Laukamp (who relatives and associates say never had such a papyrus) and the "1982" letter from Dr. Peter Munro (which appears to be a forgery). Sabar's article also provided further evidence for supposing that the papyrus was a forgery. Fritz initially denied being the papyrus' owner, but later admitted to it. Fritz was a former Egyptology student who dropped out of the Free University of Berlin in the early 1990s after the chairman of its Egyptology Institute accused him of intellectual plagiarism. Fritz acknowledged studying Coptic, the language in which the papyrus is composed. Later, Fritz left his job as director of the Stasi Museum in Berlin after items from the museum went missing. After moving to Florida, he ran successful "hotwife" pornography websites featuring his wife, an American who believes that she can channel God and Michael the Archangel; she had even published a book of sayings that she believes God transmitted through her. The Atlantic speculated that Fritz may have been motivated to forge the text by financial issues, a desire to make The Da Vinci Code a reality, or to embarrass an academic establishment that had spurned his ambitions. In addition, Fritz claimed to have been sexually abused by a Catholic priest while growing up in southern Germany. Fritz denied that he forged the Gospel of Jesus' Wife, but admitted that he might have been able to do so had he tried. Fritz also stressed to Sabar that he never once claimed that the Gospel of Jesus' Wife was a genuinely ancient text. In his 2020 book Veritas: A Harvard Professor, a Con Man and the Gospel of Jesus's Wife, Sabar reports discovering a modern forgery that Fritz submitted with his job applications in 2013 to the Sarasota County (FL) Schools: a fake master's degree in Egyptology from the Free University of Berlin. When asked about it, Fritz declined comment.

== Authenticity ==
=== Initial evaluations ===
Before King published the discovery of the fragment, she asked AnneMarie Luijendijk and fellow papyrologist Roger S. Bagnall of the Institute for the Study of the Ancient World at New York University to review the fragment. They determined that it was likely authentic, both because of the skills which would have been required to forge the fragment and because the papyrus seemed to have been in a collection for many years without having been announced. Luijendijk and Bagnall both doubted that the text was forged. Giovanni Maria Vian, the editor of L'Osservatore Romano, the Vatican's newspaper, dismissed the fragment as fake.

Immediately after King's presentation of the fragment in Rome, doubts began to be expressed about its authenticity. By the end of 2014, there was a consensus that the papyrus was a fake. Eventually, Ariel Sabar's tracing of the provenance to Walter Fritz in 2016 provided the final proof, and King conceded that the evidence "presse[d] in the direction of forgery."

Others noted that the handwriting, grammar, shape of the papyrus, and the ink's color and quality made it suspect. Professor Francis Watson of Durham University published a paper on the papyrus fragment suggesting that the text was a "patchwork of texts" from the Gospel of Thomas which had been copied and assembled in a different order. In the summer of 2015 Professor Watson edited and introduced six articles in the journal New Testament Studies, all arguing against authenticity of the text; these articles have been put online by Professor Mark Goodacre of Duke University.

In defense of the text's authenticity, Ariel Shisha-Halevy, Professor of Linguistics at the Hebrew University of Jerusalem and a leading expert on the Coptic language, concluded that the language itself offered no evidence of forgery. King also found examples from a new discovery in Egypt that has the same kind of grammar, showing that at least one unusual case is not unique. While some experts continue to disagree about the other case, King notes that newly discovered texts often feature grammatical or spelling oddities which expand our understanding of the Coptic language.

=== Scientific testing ===
Though two out of the three peer reviewers consulted by the Harvard Theological Review in mid-2012 believed that the papyrus was a probable fake, King declined to carry out scientific testing of the fragment before going public, in September 2012, at the academic conference in Rome. The omission of laboratory testing was a departure from customary practice for blockbuster manuscript finds, most recently the Gospel of Judas, which had undergone a battery of tests before National Geographic announced it in 2006.

King commissioned the first laboratory tests of the Jesus' Wife papyrus only after her 2012 announcement, amid sharp doubts about the authenticity from leading experts in Coptic language, early Christian manuscripts, and paleography. A radiocarbon dating analysis of the papyrus by Harvard University and the Woods Hole Oceanographic Institution found a mean date of AD 741. This early medieval date upended King's and Bagnall's claims that the papyrus likely dated to the fourth century AD. Though King sought to claim that the eighth-century radiocarbon date was still evidence of probable authenticity, the date was historically problematic: by the eighth century AD, Egypt was in the early Islamic era and Coptic Christianity was orthodox, making it unclear why anyone in that period would be copying a previously unknown "heretical" text about a married Jesus. A Raman spectroscopy analysis at Columbia University found that the ink was carbon-based and in some respects consistent with inks on papyri in the Columbia library dating from 400 BC to AD 700–800. But more advanced, subsequent testing of the ink by the Columbia team found similarities to modern inks and differences from genuinely ancient ones.

In a presentation at the Society of Biblical Literature's annual conference in San Antonio, Texas, in November 2016, the Columbia scientific team declared its findings about the Gospel of Jesus' Wife "consistent with manuscript as forgery." Taken together, the various scientific findings are consistent with the scholarly community's prevailing theory that a modern forger took a blank scrap of old papyrus and wrote the Gospel of Jesus' Wife text on top of it, using a simple, carbon-based ink as easy to make today as it was in antiquity. In his 2020 book Veritas, Ariel Sabar reported that two of the lead scientists King had commissioned to make the case for authenticity had no prior experience with archaeological objects and that both of the scientists had undisclosed conflicts of interest: one was a family friend of King's from childhood, the other the brother-in-law of the only other senior scholar to initially believe the papyrus was authentic. These interpersonal relationships were not disclosed to the public or to the editors of the Harvard Theological Review, which published the scientific reports in April 2014.

=== Analysis of text ===
While the papyrus itself is medieval in origin, further analysis has suggested that the text itself includes additional errors that suggest it is not authentic.

In October 2012, Andrew Bernhard observed that there is a close resemblance between Grondin's Interlinear of the Gospel of Thomas and the text that the forger appeared to have used to compose the text of the Gospel. Karen King has now made available the interlinear translation provided to her by the owner of the papyrus, and Bernhard has shown that every line shows evidence of copying from Grondin's Interlinear.

Given the extraordinary similarities between the two different texts, it seems highly probable that Gos. Jes. Wife is indeed a "patchwork" of Gos. Thom. Most likely, it was composed after 1997 when Grondin's Interlinear was first posted online.

Leo Depuydt of Brown University found it ridiculous that in the Gospel of Jesus' Wife, the word 'my' in the phrase "my wife" is written in bold, as if to stress the idea that Jesus was married. Depuydt also said that he had never seen bold writing used in a single Coptic text before. He wrote: "The effect is something like: 'My wife. Get it? MY wife. You heard that right.' The papyrus fragment seems ripe for a Monty Python sketch... . If the forger had used italics in addition, one might be in danger of losing one's composure." Christian Askeland's linguistic analysis of the text shows that it is in a dialect which fell out of use well before AD 741. He concluded that the text must have been written on a fragment of medieval papyrus by a modern forger. Dr. Askeland also found it suspicious that the author of the fragment wrote the same letter in different ways. In addition, Askeland showed that the fragment is "a match for a papyrus fragment that is clearly a forgery." This second fragment, containing part of the Gospel of John, belongs to the same anonymous owner, and is now overwhelmingly considered a fake. This is because each line on the fragment of the Gospel of John appeared to have been copied from every second line of an online translation of the gospel in an ancient Coptic dialect called Lycopolitan, necessitating an improbable scenario whereby the text, if it were genuine, had been coincidentally written on papyrus exactly twice as wide as the online translation, as well as every word (indeed, every letter) being precisely the same size as those written in the online translation. In addition, the Lycopolitan language died out prior to the sixth century, and the John fragment was carbon-dated to somewhere between the seventh and ninth centuries. Askeland argues that the John fragment was written by the same person, in the same ink, and with the same instrument as the Gospel of Jesus' Wife. Professor King felt that these concerns were legitimate, but that there was still a chance that the gospel was authentic. The Atlantic reported that despite King's reservations, the text was widely considered a fake. King later conceded, saying that evidence suggests that the Gospel of Jesus' Wife is a forgery.

== See also ==
- Jesus bloodline
- Sexuality and marital status of Jesus
- List of Gospels
