= Letter of Benan =

Literary forgery

The Letter of Benan was a literary forgery issued by Ernst Edler von der Planitz in 1910, allegedly a translation from a fifth-century Coptic papyrus containing a translation of an original composed in Greek in 83 CE. There is no evidence that either the Greek or Coptic works ever existed.

It consists of a letter purporting to be of an Egyptian physician describing his encounters with Jesus and the apostles. Internal evidence and historical inconsistencies, in the absence of the purported original manuscripts, clearly indicate this work to be a fake. It is thus counted among the modern apocrypha.
