= Péter Székely =

Hungarian chess grandmaster (1955–2003)

Personal information
- Born: 8 February 1955 Budapest, Hungary
- Died: 31 August 2003 (aged 48)

Chess career
- Country: Hungary
- Title: Grandmaster (1993)
- Peak rating: 2505 (January 1994)

Péter Székely (1955–2003) was a Hungarian chess Grandmaster.

In the 2003 Capablanca Memorial tournament he drew all 13 of his games, the shortest in 8 moves and the longest in 13 for a total of 130 moves played.
