= Deborah Szekely =

American activist, philanthropist and writer (born 1922)

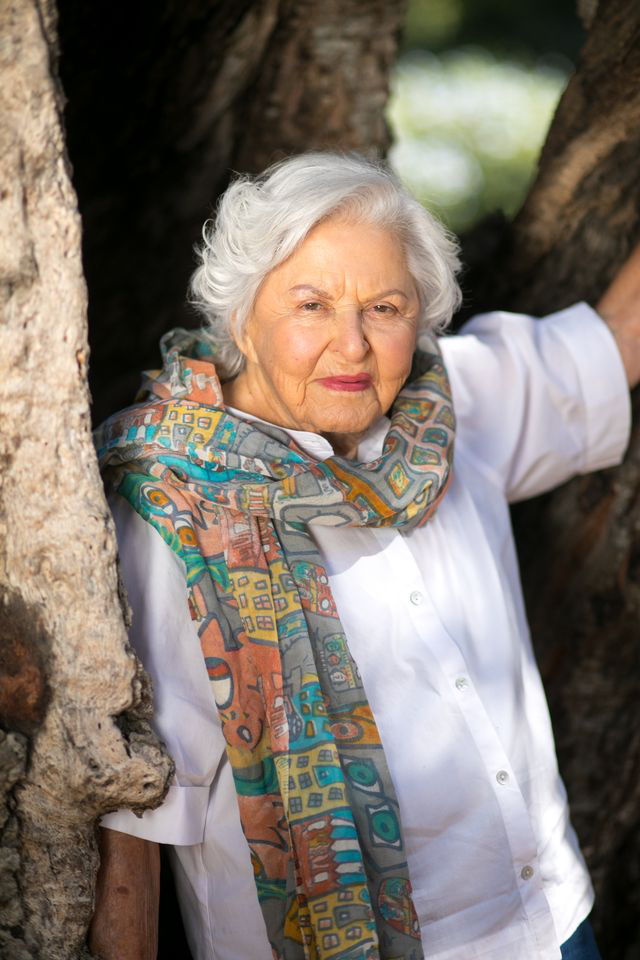
- Szekely in 2021
- Born: Deborah Shainman; May 3, 1922 (age 103); New York City, U.S.
- Occupation: Writer
- Notable work: Cooking with the Seasons at Rancho La Puerta
- Spouse: Edmond Bordeaux Szekely (m. 1939; div. 1970)
- Children: 2

Deborah Szekely (née Shainman, born May 3, 1922) is an American activist, philanthropist, and cookbook writer active in Southern California. She was named the "Godmother of Wellness" by the Huffington Post. Szekely founded the New Americans Museum in Liberty Station. She is a pescetarian and advocate of plant-based nutrition.

== Biography ==
Szekely was the daughter of Jewish immigrants. Her mother was a past vice-president of the New York Vegetarian Society. Szekely worked as an assistant to Edmond Bordeaux Szekely. They were married in 1939. In 1940, the couple opened a camp in Tecate, Baja California, Mexico, which they named Rancho la Puerta, where they could explore and test their ideas. The couple had two children, Alexander and Sarah Livia.

In 1958, Szekely opened the Golden Door, a smaller luxury spa property in San Diego and moved to Escondido, California in the 70's. The spa attracted famous individuals such as Natalie Wood, Elizabeth Taylor, Zsa Zsa Gabor, Burt Lancaster, Oprah Winfrey and Barbra Streisand. In 1970, she and Edmund divorced and Szekely took over the operation of the Rancho la Puerta.

She founded (COMBO), Combined Arts and Education Council of San Diego County in 1978, which has raised over $25 million to support 21 cultural organizations. In 1978, COMBO raised over $6 million to rebuild the Old Globe Theatre. Szekely was a U.S. Diplomat and the head of the Inter-American Foundation from 1984 to 1990.

In 1982, she ran for the United States House of Representatives as a Republican for the newly created 43rd Congressional District. She finished a close fourth place in the primary, slightly behind former professional football player Bill McColl, Carlsbad Mayor Ron Packard, and wealthy businessman Johnnie Crean. Crean won the primary by a very narrow margin.

In 2014, Szekely was inducted into the San Diego County Women's Hall of Fame by the Women's Museum of California, the Commission on the Status of Women, the Women's Center at UC San Diego, and the Department of Women's Studies at San Diego State University.

== Personal life ==
Szekely has been a pescetarian since her childhood and prefers whole foods. She supports tree planting. Szekely turned 100 on May 3, 2022.

== Selected publications ==
- Secrets of the Golden Door (1977)
- Golden Door Cookbook: The Greening of American Cuisine (1982)
- Vegetarian Spa Cuisine from Rancho LA Puerta (1992)
- Cooking with the Seasons at Rancho La Puerta (2008)
