= Lost Chapter of the Acts of the Apostles =

Modern apocryphal text

The Lost Chapter of the Acts of the Apostles, also known as the Sonnini Manuscript or The 29th Chapter of Acts, is a short text purported to be the lost final chapter of the Acts of the Apostles, in which Paul the Apostle journeys to Roman Britain. Mainstream scholarship considers the "Lost Chapter" an example of modern apocrypha. The text originated in London in 1871; its author is unknown. The intent of the "Lost Chapter" was likely to support British Israelism, a pseudohistorical belief popular at the time of its publication.

The canonical book of Acts has 28 chapters; the "Lost Chapter" is a putative 29th chapter. The canonical Acts ends abruptly with Paul under house arrest in Rome. The "Lost Chapter" does not explain how Paul is freed from his imprisonment.

== Origin ==
The "Lost Chapter" text originated in London in 1871 as a purported English translation of a French text produced by naturalist Sonnini de Manoncourt. Sonnini was said to have discovered the source of his translation in a "Greek manuscript that he discovered in the archives at Constantinople, and which was given to him by the Ottoman Sultan Abdoul Achmet". A manuscript containing Sonnini's putative translation was purported to have been found in the library of Sir John Newport, MP (1756–1843), hidden in an English translation of Sonnini's Voyage en Grèce et en Turquie. No trace of any such manuscript has been found. Biblical scholar Edgar J. Goodspeed concluded that "it is probable that this curious chapter was written not long before its publication in 1871."

== Contents ==
As told by the "Lost Chapter," Paul traveled to the island of Britain, where he preached to one of the Ten Lost Tribes of Israelites on "Mount Lud" (Ludgate Hill), later the site of St Paul's Cathedral, and met with Druids who proved to him that they were descended from Jews. Then Paul preached in Gaul and what is now Belgium, and then in what is now Switzerland. In this last stop, a miraculous earthquake occurred at the site where, according to another apocryphal text, Pontius Pilate was claimed to have committed suicide.

== See also ==
- Acts of the Apostles (genre)
- Pseudepigrapha
- St. Paul in Britain

== Sources ==
- Goodspeed, Edgar J. (1931). Strange New Gospels. Chicago, IL: University of Chicago Press. OCLC 186915807.
- Parfitt, Tudor (2003). The lost tribes of Israel: the history of a myth (1st pbk. ed.). London: Phoenix. ISBN 978-1-842126653.
