= Prank of Bardakçı Baba =

Fake tomb of a fictional mystic Alevi leader

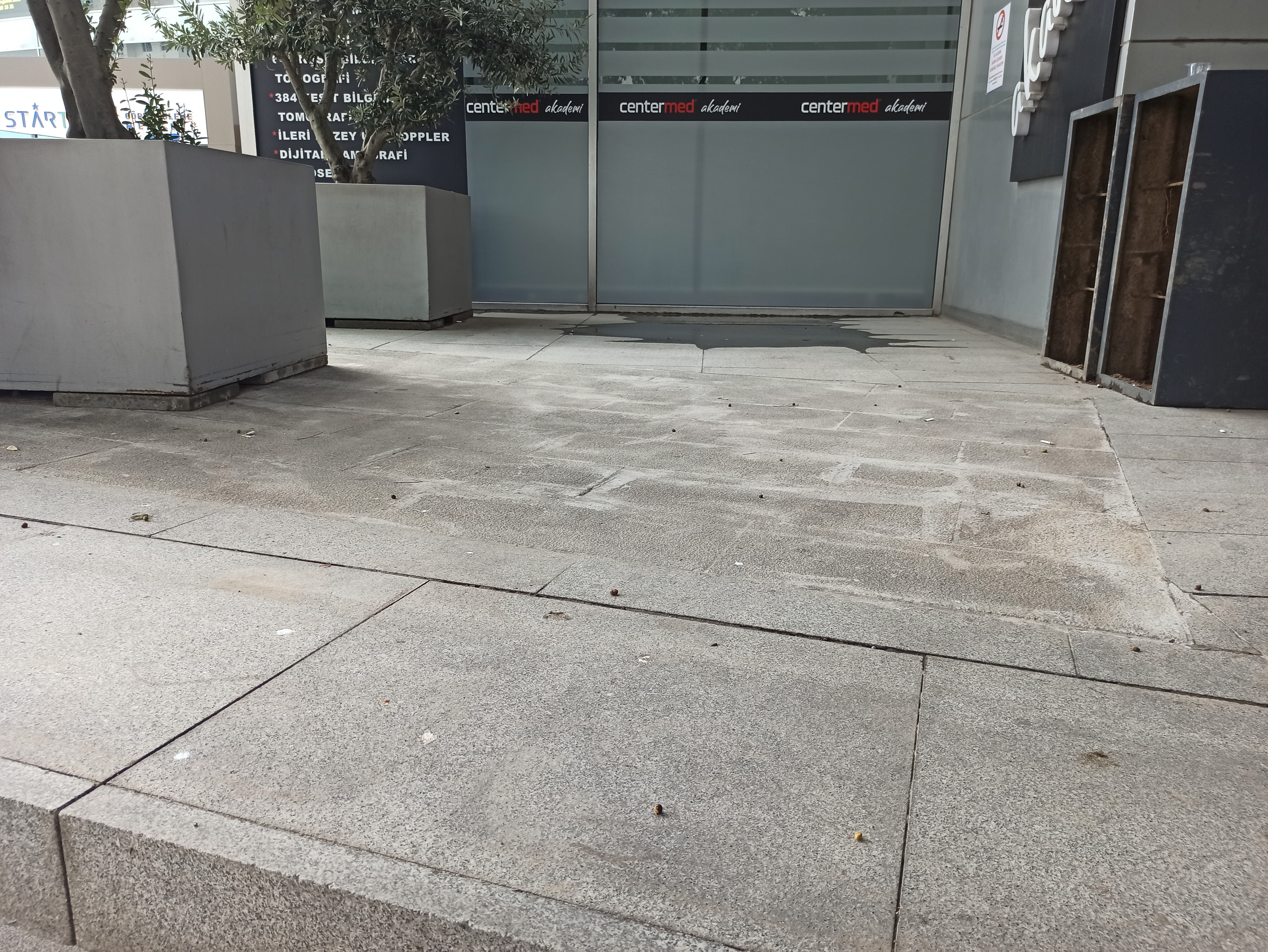
The site of Bardakçı Baba's tomb, recognisable by the different paving

The Prank of Bardakçı Baba ("master glass maker" in Turkish) consisted of the creation of a fake tomb of a Sufi mystic who never existed, in Istanbul's Fulya quarter. The tomb, erected in the early 1970s as part of a prank and subsequently moved, rebuilt in lavish form and finally dismantled in the early 2020s, had become an object of popular piety in the district.

== History ==
=== Making of the sepulchre ===
In the early 1970s, a group of young students at the Faculty of Dentistry of the Marmara University in Istanbul, located in the Fulya quarter of Beşiktaş district, had turned a grove next to the school into a meeting place, where they would gather in the evenings to study and drink wine among the trees. After a while, students brought a wooden table, a few chairs, and some glasses. Over time the members of the group increased, and with them the number of glasses. One day, the students jokingly wrote the name "Bardakçı Baba" on the table. Later, they built a tomb-like mound and hid the skull they used for practice in it. Thus was born the "Tomb of Bardakçı Baba" ("Master Glass maker" in Turkish) a mystic Sufi where Baba is the honorary title given to Muslim mystics. One evening, returning to the grove, they discovered that someone had brought a bottle of water and placed it in front of the mound as a sign of devotion. Thus, the cult of Bardakçı Baba was born. In the 1970s, the mound was moved for road works across the street, and became a place frequented by the inhabitants of the neighbourhood who asked for graces for all sorts of reasons, such as health problems, advancement in work, lack of money, and unrequited love. Glasses were brought as an offering and broken in front of the mound. In the 2000s, the area was developed, and the mound, near which the worship department had put up a poster explaining the necessity of praying directly to Allah and not human intermediaries, came to be located on the site of a luxury shopping centre.

=== Revealing the prank ===
At that point, in 2002, one of the participants in the hoax came out into the open, recounting the prank, and explained that the skull was one of those used for practice, describing the plastic crowns and palate made by the students. He justified the delay in disclosure by stating that with the presence of the grave he had hoped to avoid the felling of the trees in the grove. The builder proposed to remove the mould, but there was a popular uprising, so an elegant black marble tomb was built, bordered by crystals (an allusion to the deceased's profession) and illuminated at night, which bore the usual inscription on Turkish tombs Ruhuna Fatiha, i.e. the exhortation to recite al-Fātiḥa, the first sura of the Quran, in memory of the deceased. At the same time, Istanbul's cemetery department and the Mufti of Beşiktaş made an investigation and discovered that no mention of the Muslim holy man existed in the official records. However, this did not prevent the construction of the new tomb in 2008. Finally, some 15 years after the revelation of the prank, the tomb was dismantled, and nowadays the only trace of it is a different paving stone on the pavement where it stood.

== Sources ==
- Emre Öktem (2016). Istanbul insolita e segreta (in Italian). Venice: Jonglez. ISBN 978-2-36195-104-7.
