= Karen Leigh King =

American historian

Karen Leigh King (born February 16, 1954, raised in Sheridan, Montana) is a historian of religion working in the field of Early Christianity, who is the Hollis Professor of Divinity at Harvard University, which is the oldest endowed chair in the United States, having been established in 1721. She was the first woman to be appointed to the position.

== Career ==
Karen L. King attended Voss Gymnasium in Voss, Norway, through the International Christian Youth Exchange Program (1971–72). She graduated with a B.A. summa cum laude from the University of Montana in 1976, and completed her Ph.D. at Brown University in 1984. In 1982–83 she studied in Berlin with a fellowship from the Deutsche Akademische Austauschdienst, working officially at the Free University in West Berlin while meeting regularly with Hans-Martin Schenke, Professor at the Humboldt University in East Berlin. From 1984 until 1997, she taught in the Department of Religious Studies at Occidental College, Los Angeles. In 1997, she was appointed Professor of New Testament and History of Ancient Christianity at the Harvard Divinity School.

== Work ==
King's research focuses on previously unknown Christian texts discovered in Egypt in the modern period, especially those of the "Nag Hammadi library" found in Nag Hammadi in 1945. This research has uncovered historically marginalized or lost perspectives in Christian thought that reveal some of the extant diversity and dynamics of early belief and practice from the first centuries of Christianity. She has in particular explored the roles of women, images of the feminine divine principle, Jesus's sexuality and gender, diversity of attitudes toward persecution and violence and notions of what it means to be human, among other topics.

=== Jesus' wife ===
King found herself at the center of an international controversy after a papyrus which she had introduced at a scholarly conference in Rome in 2012, and thereafter became known as the Gospel of Jesus' Wife – because it appeared to make reference to Jesus as having a wife – was found to have a false provenance. In 2016, despite acknowledging likely forgery, King stated that there was no reason to retract her earlier published research on the forged document. In 2020, journalist Ariel Sabar published Veritas: A Harvard Professor, a Con Man and the Gospel of Jesus's Wife. A Wall Street Journal review of Veritas reported that King had "embarked on a phased retirement".

== Published works ==
In addition to numerous articles, King's books include:

- The Secret Revelation of John. Cambridge, Massachusetts: Harvard University Press, 2006.
- The Gospel of Mary of Magdala. Jesus and the First Woman Apostle. Santa Rosa, California: Polebridge Press, 2003.
- What is Gnosticism? Cambridge, Massachusetts: Harvard University Press, 2003.
- Revelation of the Unknowable God. NHC XI.3 Allogenes, Introduction, Critical Text, Translation and Notes. California Classical Library 1. Santa Rosa, California: Polebridge Press, 1996.

King also co-authored Reading Judas: The Gospel of Judas and the Shaping of Christianity with Elaine Pagels (2007). She is the editor of Images of the Feminine in Gnosticism (1988) and Women and Goddess Traditions in Antiquity and Today (2000), and co-editor of For the Children, Perfect Instruction: Studies in Honor of Hans-Martin Schenke on the Occasion of the Berliner Arbeitskreis für Koptisch-gnostische Schriften’s Thirtieth Year.
