= Edmond Bordeaux Szekely =

Hungarian scholar (1905–1979)

- Born: March 5, 1905 Máramarossziget, Hungary (today Sighetu Marmației, Romania)
- Died: 1979 (aged 73–74)
- Occupation: Philologist/linguist, philosopher, psychologist
- Genre: Religion
- Spouses: Deborah Shainman (m. 1939; div. 1970); Norma Nilsson
- Children: 2

Edmond Bordeaux Szekely (March 5, 1905 – 1979) was a Hungarian philologist/linguist, philosopher, psychologist and natural living enthusiast. Szekely authored The Essene Gospel of Peace, which he alleged to have translated from an ancient text he discovered in the 1920s. Scholars consider the text a forgery. He was grandson of Sándor Székely, poet and Unitarian bishop of Kolozsvár and descendant of Sándor Kőrösi Csoma.

== Life ==
Szekely's grandfather was Sándor Székely, poet and Unitarian Bishop of Kolozsvár; his mother was French and Roman Catholic, and his father was a Hungarian Unitarian. According to Szekely's book 'Essene Gospel of Peace', he was a descendant of Hungarian philologist and orientologist Sándor Kőrösi Csoma (although the latter never married and had no children).

Per publications of the International Biogenic Society, including 'The Essene Gospel of Peace', Szekely received a Ph.D. from the University of Paris, and other degrees from the universities of Vienna and Leipzig. He held professorships in philosophy and in experimental psychology at the Franz Joseph University in Kolozsvár (now Cluj-Napoca, in Romania). His books were published in English, Romanian, Esperanto, German, French, Hungarian, and Spanish, per the introductory bibliography in his 1938 book 'Cosmotherapy, the Medicine of the Future'. Szekely claimed to have translated a text he discovered at the Vatican in 1923, called The Essene Gospel of Peace which he published in four parts over several decades. With the 1974 edition, he also included what he said was the complete original Hebrew text from which he translated Book 1.

In 1928, Szekely founded the International Biogenic Society, with Nobel Prize-winning novelist Romain Rolland. Szekely travelled widely, to Tahiti, Africa, the Carpathians, France, and Eastern Europe. L Purcell Weaver met Szekely in Tahiti in 1934 and attributed his improved health to him. Weaver went on to translate several of Szekely's works, beginning with the 1936 book "Cosmos, Man and Society: A Paneubiotic Synthesis".

During the late 1930s he lived in Leatherhead, England working there as the director of the British International Health and Education Centre.

In 1939, Szekely married Brooklyn-born Deborah Shainman, whose mother was a past vice-president of the New York Vegetarian Society. In 1940, the couple opened a camp in Tecate, Baja California, Mexico, at the foot of sacred mountain Cuchuma of the Kumeyaay nation, which they named Rancho la Puerta, where they could explore and test their ideas. The couple had two children, Alexander and Sarah Livia. Edmund Szekely continued his research, writing numerous books and conducting seminars all over the world.

In 1970, Szekely and his wife divorced and he retired from Rancho La Puerta to go live near Orosi, Costa Rica. Szekely married Norma Nilsson, a long-time assistant, and focused on his writing and teaching. He died in 1979.

== Vegetarianism ==
Szekely was a raw foodist and vegetarian who advocated "biogenic living". His diet consisted of 75% "biogenic" foods such as whole grains, nuts and seeds and "bioactive" raw fruits and vegetables.

He recommended a raw food diet, hydrotherapy, breathing clean air and bathing in sunshine.

== Controversy: The Essene Gospel of Peace ==
Szekely claimed that, while studying at the Vatican in 1923, he had found and translated several obscure Hebrew and Aramaic texts which he said proved the Essenes were vegetarians, and that vegetarianism was prescribed by Jesus.

Szekely claimed to have found an Aramaic translation of The Essene Gospel of Peace and The Essene Book of Revelation at the Vatican library. In the scriptorium of the Benedictine monastery of Monte Cassino he claimed to have found the original Hebrew text of The Essene Gospel of Peace. His findings, as did the writings of Romain Rolland, often challenged the assumptions of conventional religious adherents and politicized, established religious institutions about the life and teachings of Jesus, and he was therefore often criticized by them.

Szekely later said that he recognized several fragments in these that were either similar, or identical, to various passages from the Old and New Testaments, the Dead Sea Scrolls, and the Avesta and thus he relied on available English editions of those works to produce the style of language used in his translations. Book 1, which he said constituted an eighth of the material, was published in 1936. He published more material in following years, including Books 2 and 3 in 1974, which with Book 1, he said, make up a third of the material. With the 1974 edition, he also included what he said was the complete original Hebrew text from which he translated Book 1. While Szekely's claimed translations of the so-called "Essene Texts" have drawn interest from followers of various faiths, the original manuscripts have never been located, and have been considered forgeries by some modern religious scholars.

When University of Lund theologian Per Beskow investigated Szekely's claims in Strange Tales About Jesus, both the Vatican and the National Library of Vienna denied that the original manuscripts existed. The Vatican also denied that Szekely had ever been admitted to the Vatican Archives in 1923. The third claimed manuscript source was the library at Monte Cassino, which was destroyed during World War II.

Szekely's claims were rejected by biblical scholars. Per Beskow has noted that:

The [Essene] Gospel of Peace is a sheer forgery, written by Szekely himself. It is one of the strangest frauds we know of in the biblical field, as it has been carried through by stages during a whole lifetime and has been built onto an entire body of research based on imagination only.

Richard A. Young has written:

Proof that Jesus was vegetarian is based on The Essene Gospel of Peace, which Szekely claims to have translated from an ancient text he supposedly discovered in the 1920s. Szekely alleges that this ancient gospel text is authentic and that the canonical gospels are forgeries. However, no one besides Szekely has ever seen the manuscript. This and other reasons prompt scholars to conclude that The Essene Gospel of Peace is a disreputable forgery.

Some critics have pointed out that Szekely, after originally publishing a French translation, first published it in English in 1937 as The gospel of peace of Jesus Christ by the disciple John. After the discovery of the Dead Sea Scrolls in the 1940s and intense public interest in the Essenes, Szekely republished an updated version as The Essene Gospel of John. The scrolls appearing on the title page of later editions are not the manuscripts Szekely claimed to translate, but a reversed image of a Dead Sea Scroll from Professor Millar Burrows The Dead Sea Scrolls, published in 1958.

== Rancho la Puerta ==
In 1940, Szekely and his wife opened a camp they named Rancho la Puerta in Baja California. The camp had one adobe hut and the Szekelys started an organic garden, bought goats and began marketing cheese, and invited like-minded people to visit for $17.50 a week. Guests (who chopped wood, milked goats, and brought their own tents) listened to Szekely's lectures on achieving good health, long life, and the interdependence of mind, body and spirit. Szekely spoke against herbicides, pesticides, artificial fertilizers, the increasing use of food processing, and the dangers of cigarettes. He emphasized the threat of pollution and the need for pure air and pure water, recommendations for safe sunbathing, and the dangers of cholesterol and fats in the American diet.

As the spa increased in size in the early 1950s and began to operate year-round, visitors of another sort were attracted by the weight-loss potential of Rancho la Puerta's vegetarian diet. Szekely and his wife began searching for and hiring specialists in yoga and other mind/body exercise regimens, adding a fitness aspect to their offerings.

Today, Rancho La Puerta is a 3,000-acre (12 km^{2}) holistic health spa and eco-resort with a staff of nearly 400, owned and operated by the Szekely family. The spa is situated on the slopes of Mount Kuchumaa. The spa includes, among other things, a full-size replica of the labyrinth of the Cathedral of Chartres, 32 acres (130,000 m^{2}) of gardens, a 5-acre (20,000 m^{2}) organic garden, 87 rooms, eleven gyms, a library, and the Szekely Art Collection—sculpture, painting, glass, and other work primarily by Mexican and South American artists.

== See also ==
- List of Gospels (The Essene Gospel of John)
- The Gospel of the Holy Twelve

== Annotated bibliography ==
Szekely is the author of over 80 books, including two autobiographies. Some of his best-known are:

- Az Emberi Gondolat Története (History of Human Thought, in Hungarian, Hermes publishers)
- Az Emberi Társadalmak Története (History of human societies, in Hungarian, Hermes publishers)
- Cosmos, Man and Society: A Paneubiotic Synthesis (First published 1936). Translated and Edited by L. Purcell Weaver. Published London: The C.W. Daniel Company. 816 pages. Subsequent edition published 1937 with an index, and comprising 841 pages. In both editions, the translator (Weaver) contributed a preface outlining how he came to know and be involved in Szekely's work. Revised edition published 1948. Rare copies circulate via out-of-print book sales, and in some libraries such as the Soil and Health Library of Tasmania, Australia.
- Cosmos, Man and Society (1973). Published San Diego, California, by Academy Books. 134 pages. Not related to the 1936/1937 book above. It is a selection of chapters from the 1938/1951 book Medicine Tomorrow, which is listed below.
- Cosmotherapia, Naturismo integral (International Cosmotherapeutic Expedition publishers, Los Angeles)
- Cosmotherapy: A Guide to Treatment. (1936). Translated and Edited by L. Purcell Weaver. Published London: The C.W. Daniel Company.
- Cosmotherapy and the International Therapeutic Movement (International Cosmotherapeutic Expedition publishers, Los Angeles)
- Cosmotherapy of the Essenes
- Cosmotherapy, the Medicine of the Future (International Cosmotherapeutic Expedition publishers, Los Angeles, 1938)
- Deutsch und doch nicht Deutsch (in German, Esperanto Verlag publishers)
- Discovery of the Essene Gospel Of Peace
- Esperanto Lernolibro lau Psikoteknika Metodo (in Esperanto, Mondo publishers)
- Essene Gospel Of Peace, Book 1
- Essene Gospel Of Peace, Book 2: The Unknown Book of the Essenes
- Essene Gospel of Peace, book 3: Lost Scrolls of the Essene Brotherhood
- Essene Gospel Of Peace, Book 4: The Teachings of the Elect
- Essene Origins Of Christianity: How The Great Pan Died
- Essene Way: Biogenic Living
- Ia Ora Na, la guerison de toutes les maladies et la prolongation de la vie avec un siecle (in French, A Bambridge)
- Medicine and Dialectics (1937). Bureau of Cosmotherapy (Lawrence Weaver House, Leatherhead, Surrey) and C.W. Daniel Co., London. 36 pages.
- Medicine Tomorrow: An Introduction to Cosmotherapy, with a Guide to Treatment. Second (revised edition, 1951). 400 pages. Translated and Edited by Purcell Weaver. Published Ashington, Rochford, Essex: The C.W. Daniel Company. First published 1938. A subsequent 134 page selection of chapters (I-VIII, pp. 11–97; & XVI-XVIII, pp. 219–260) from this book was published in 1973 as Cosmos, Man and Society (not to be confused with the original 800+ page, 1936/1937 title) by Academy Books of San Diego.
- Sciences de l'avenir (in French, Bibliothèque du Mouvement Correlativiste)
- Sciences modernes dans la philosophie, psychologie et sociologie (in French, doctoral thesis, University of Paris)
- Sexual Harmony. (1972). Published San Diego, California: Academy Books.
- The Dialectical Method of Thinking. (1973). San Diego, California: Academy Books
- The Evolution of Human Thought. (1984). Published in Costa Rica, Central America, by International Biogenic Society. Printed in U.S. The text of this book is from chapter VII (pages 327–346) of the now unavailable 1936/37 Cosmos Man and Society.
- Treasury of Raw Foods. (1981). Published in Costa Rica, Central America. International Biogenic Society. Printed in U.S. The text of this book is from chapter XIX (pages 541–576) of the 1936/37 book Cosmos Man and Society.
- University Course of Cosmotherapy (International Cosmotherapeutic Expedition publishers)
- Utopia (in Romanian, a collection of essays published in the review 'Utopia')

=== Works translated by L. Purcell Weaver ===
The above-listed 1951 book 'Medicine Tomorrow' lists the following works as having been translated into English by Weaver.

- Cosmos, Man and Society: A Paneubiotic Synthesis
- Medicine Tomorrow: Introduction to Cosmotherapy with Guide to Treatment
- Sexual Harmony and the New Eugenics
- The Therapeutics of Fasting
- Medicine and Dialectics
- The Future of Medicine
- Sleep and the Will
- The Gospel of Peace of Jesus Christ by the Disciple John
- The Teaching of Buddha
- The Living Jesus
- Yoga in the Twentieth Century and The Meaning of Christmas
- Zoroaster, the Master of Life
- Man, Art and World-Conception
- Sermon on the Mount: An Essene Interpretation
- Genesis: An Essene Interpretation
- Cottage Economy

== Notes and references ==
- Melton, Dr. J. Gordon: 'New Age Almanac', Visible Ink publishers, Detroit MI USA, 1991.
- Joan, J.T.G, "Das Geheimnis des wahren Evangeliums" Band 1. Der wissenschaftliche Nachweis für die Existenz des Essener Evangeliums. 2014 ISBN 978-1506005379 (CreateSpace-Assigned) ISBN 1506005373
