= Per Beskow =

Swedish biblical scholar (1926–2016)

- Born: Per Erik Beskow; December 23, 1926; Stockholm, Sweden
- Died: March 3, 2016 (aged 89); Visby, Gotland, Sweden
- Occupations: Theologian, church historian, patrologist and associate professor at Lund University
- Years active: 1962-2016

Per Erik Beskow (23 December 1926 in Stockholm − 3 March 2016 in Visby) was a Swedish biblical scholar, theologian, church historian, patrologist and associate professor at Lund University.

== Biography ==
Per Beskow was born on December 23, 1926, as son of the postmaster Erik Janzon and Elsa Nygren. He belonged to the Beskow family through his grandmother Anna Beskow.

Beskow studied theology at Uppsala University and got a great interest in patristics, the early church literature and theology. He was ordained in the Church of Sweden in 1952 for Strängnäs diocese, and then continued his licentiate and doctoral studies in practical theology and church history. In 1961 he was admitted to the Roman Catholic Church.

Beskow defended his thesis in Uppsala in 1962 for theology doctoral degree and became a master of philosophy in 1966. He was appointed associate professor in exegetical patristics at Uppsala University after his doctoral thesis and was promoted to theology jubilee doctor in 2012.

In 1968, he was associate professor at Boston College, the University of Jesuits in Boston, to participate in the construction of a graduate department . From 1969 to 1972, he was an associate professor at the University of Applied Sciences in Gävle, 1972–1973 lecturer at St. Martin's College in Lancaster, England (equivalent to a college of teachers). He taught in the New Testament Exegesis at Uppsala from 1973 to 1974.

Between 1974 and 1985 he was an associate professor of religious history in Lund. In 1979 he founded Collegium Patristicum Lundense together with other researchers. He also published a series of translations of patristic texts. In his work "Strange Tales about Jesus" (1983), he criticized the research of Edmond Székely, proving the falsification of his work in the Vatican archive and the Austrian National Library.

From 1985 to 1992 he was a senior lecturer in church history at the Department of Theology in Lund.

From 1989 he was an employee of the National Encyclopedia and wrote about 1,000 articles in the subject of religion and continued with updates of NE's online edition. Beskow was a member of the Nathan Söderblom Society and the Science Society in Lund.

In 2011, he received the Anders Nygren Prize from the Faculty of Theology at Lund University. Artos & Norma book publisher founded 2014 Per Beskow's prize for younger academics/writers who work within the meeting between theology, society and culture. The 2014 award went to Associate Professor Jayne Svenungsson.

He died on March 3, 2016, in Visby on the island of Gotland.

== Publications ==
His Strange Tales (1985) is a collection of essays and researches into modern apocrypha, what Beskow later (2011) preferred to term "mystifications." These included investigations into Edmund Bordeaux Szekely's hoax "Essene Letter" (1937) and others. Strange Tales was one of the first books to cast doubt on Morton Smith's Secret Gospel of Mark. Smith responded by threatening to sue Fortress Press. Strange Tales (1985) also covered, in English, the subject of his earlier Jesus i Kashmir : Historien om en legend (1981) dealing with claims of Jesus' travels to India. Beskow updated his researches on these "mysteries" in The Blackwell Companion to Jesus (2011).

== Bibliography ==
- Rex Gloriae: The Kingship of Christ in the Early Church (thesis), 1962.
- Theological dictionary, 1975.
- Tron's roads (first published in 1973 with the title Religion Studies for Class Teacher Education), 1980, 10 edition 2003.
- Findings and cheats in the bible world, 1979 extended and processed edition 2005.
- Jesus in Kashmir, 1981.
- Strange Tales about Jesus, 1983.
- Easter, 1986.
- Maria in cult, art, vision, 1991.
- Scandinavian Christianity in European perspective (together with Reinhardt Staats), 1994.
- The Christian Church: from the Apostles to the Renaissance (together with Jan Arvid Hellström and Nils-Henrik Nilsson), 1995.
- Theological dictionary, 1999.
- Lectio divina: a guide to Christian spirituality, 2000.
- Cistercian, 2008.
- The icon: presence and source (together with Samuel Rubenson, Britt-Inger Johansson, Lars Gerdmar and Paul Meyendorff) 2011.
- The Saints, 2012

Translation and commentary on patristic texts:

- Solomon's ode (together with Sten Hidal), 1980.
- Desert language of the desert fathers, 1982.
- Melito by Sardes, About Easter, 1984.
- Ambrosius of Milan, About the Sacraments, About the Mysteries, 1989.
- Cyril of Jerusalem, Catechesis, 1992.
- Egeria, Travel Letter from the Holy Land (commentary), 2006.
- The Apostolic Fathers (together with Olof Andrén), 1992.
- Has participated in the Swedish Patristic Library 1998–2008.
- Red. by Birgitta of Vadstena, pilgrim and prophet (together with Annette Landen), 2003.
- Employees in Forums Religionlex, 1996, 2006.
- Scientific papers in various publications.
- Articles in magazines, including in Signum and Pilgrim.
- Participated in the 1980s on the cultural side of Sydsvenskan.

== Sources ==
- National encyclopedia, CD edition, 2000.
