= Carpocratians =

Gnostic-platonic early Christian heretic sect

- Καρποκρατιανοὶ
- Classification: Early Christianity
- Scripture: New Testament
- Theology: Gnosticism
- Founder: Carpocrates of Alexandria
- Origin: 2nd century AD; Alexandria
- Defunct: 6th century AD

The Carpocratians (Greek: Καρποκρατιανοὶ) were a Gnostic sect partially based on Platonism that was established in the 2nd century AD and existed until the 6th century. It was named after Carpocrates of Alexandria, its founder, and gained its final form in the writings of his son, Epiphanes. Only fragmentary sources remain about their beliefs and practices, and proto-orthodox Christians of the time mischaracterised their theology to discredit them, accusing them of debauchery.

== Theology ==
The Carpocratians were Gnostics, believing in a dualism of evil matter and good spirit, and pursuing gnosis, the esoteric knowledge needed for salvation. As others of the belief system, they believed all beings in the world strove towards Monas, the Supreme Principle or Primal Being, whom Carpocratians called the Father of All, or the One Beginning. The visible world was created not by him but by inferior angels far removed from the divine source, known as the 'fabricating powers' or the 'builders'.

Human souls existed before being trapped in material bodies, orbiting around a 'spiritual sun' on the 'plain of truth'. After initially working with God, souls were imprisoned by the 'builders' in bodies and can only be free after living every form of life and committing every possible act. Based on Luke 12:58, Carpocrates said that the Devil, or 'the accuser', dragged souls to the highest 'builder', who then gave them over to a messenger angel. This being imprisoned souls in bodies until they 'paid the uttermost farthing' (Matthew 5:26, King James Version), won freedom and re-joined God.

Every imprisoned soul retained the capacity for remembering their natural state (Greek: ἀνάμνησις, romanized: anamnesis) to a different degree. This knowledge is the only one through which humans can be saved, every other moral judgment being subjective.

Carpocratians rejected the material world, which they believed to have been created and ruled by evil. To prove their belonging to a superior spiritual realm, they claimed to communicate with demonic spirits. They also practiced a form of magic, making love potions and using theurgic incantantions, as they considered themselves above the 'builders'. This also gave them the power to exorcise, understand dreams, and cure disease. For worship, they erected statues and painted brightly coloured icons of Christ, the apostles, and other eminent men such as Plato, Pythagoras, and Aristotle, becoming the first known Christians to depict Christ. They honoured these figures in a temple on Cephalonia.

They professed the transmigration of souls (Greek: μετεμψύχωσις, romanized: metempsychosis), which they might have lifted from Indian or Pythagorean sources, believing that a soul could only be freed if he remembered his former, better existence. Then, he could defy the evil spirits of the world and reach eternal rest in contemplating the Supreme Being. They rejected the idea of bodily resurrection, and the entirety of the Old Testament.

=== The role of Jesus ===
Carpocratians revered Jesus as a man whose soul had not forgotten its origins in the higher sphere of the perfect God. Believing that Jesus had been a Gnostic, they strove to imitate him, but considered him to have been an ordinary human being, not the son of God. In the Carpocratian world view, Jesus was seen as excellent in holiness and virtue, and possessing a great elasticity of mind that enabled him to remember his (and all other humans') previous existence with the Primal Being. With his extraordinary strength of soul and through the power of contemplation, he obtained divine power to perform miracles which he then used to overturn the evil religion and break free from the control of the Jewish God who had dictated it.

It was taught that anyone could become equal to Jesus with enough effort, and that he could even be excelled by someone with an even purer soul, or who despised the material world even more than he had. Every Carpocratian believer was thought to resemble Jesus to a large degree, and it was claimed that their best believers attained his level of transcendence and rose above the apostles.

The natural-born son of Joseph and Mary, Jesus was known by them to have been raised among Jews, but they held that he detested them. They might have believed that Jesus had studied at the Temple of Isis in Egypt for six years, learning gnosis there, which he then taught to the apostles, ordering them to disseminate it among the 'worthy and believing'. Their founder, Carpocrates, was believed by them to have gained his knowledge of the religion from the apostles.

=== Libertine Gnosticism ===
As Carpocratians taught that biblical laws had been imposed by the evil angels responsible for the material realm, they considered subverting them a religious responsibility. They hoped to achieve transcendence and spiritual freedom by having every possible experience, for which more than one lifetime might be necessary. They backed this claim by quoting the Sermon on the Mount, where Jesus preached that '[t]ruly, I say to you, you will never get out until you have paid the last penny' (Matthew 5:26, English Standard Version).

Carpocratians professed that nothing was inherently good or bad, and that questions of right and wrong depended entirely on human opinion. Because of this belief, they were accused by members of other Christian groups of living debauched lives, and given the name of 'libertine Gnostics'; however, this accusation is not found in the oldest source on the sect, an account by Irenæus.

==== The position of wives and views on sexuality ====
Since Carpocrates and his followers rejected private property, they also held that women should be shared by all men of the community for procreation. Epiphanes taught that God's righteousness was a 'communion together with equality', and this ideal would have been offended by privately 'possessing' a woman. Sexuality was seen as part of the material world, and the commandment against adultery a 'joke' by the God of the Jews, who first gave an urge then forbade humans from acting on it. Marriage was seen as this evil god 'forcing what is in common to be individual', taking away something from humans that he allowed all other creatures to have.

Proto-orthodox Christians of the time such as Clement of Alexandria or Theodoret claimed this was merely an excuse for sinning. At the same time as other Christian groups embraced asceticism and celibacy in the 4th and 5th centuries, Carpocratians fostered a more liberal attitude. Their opponents therefore discredited them by accusing them of holding orgies and saying that they hoped to achieve salvation by committing every possible evil deed. Thomas Whitley characterises the Carpocratian movement as a sign of the opposition to the emerging ascetic demands of the early Christian religion.

== History ==
Founded in the 2nd century by Carpocrates of Alexandria, the sect's belief system and community was solidified in the writings of his son, Epiphanes. Both men were well-educated in the writings and thought of Plato, and this background informed their theology. No original writings remain from Carpocrates, but some of his rhetoric can be traced from fragments in his son's works.

According to Clement of Alexandria, Epiphanes died at the age of seventeen, after already having authored his books, and was subsequently worshipped as a god. This was refuted as a legend by 19th century scholars who argued that the cult of a local moon god (theos epiphanes) was mistakenly applied to him. While Philip Schaff's religious encyclopædia disputes this claim, its writers agree that Epiphanes had to have been an important writer of the sect.

There is proof that Carpocratians were one of the best-developed among Gnostic cults, and they are known to have existed until the 6th century. Members had secret greetings, signs, and symbols, as well as a hierarchy. They might have been branded with a hot iron behind the right ear with a special mark.

== See also ==
- Adamites
- Borborites
- Cainites
- Nicolaism
- Sethianism
- Libertinism
- Platonic Christianity
- Gnosticism and Neoplatonism
- Middle Platonism
- Lechner, Gerhard. "Carpocration Philosophical Magic". Rose+Croix Journal. 16 – via PhilArchive.
- Litwa, M. David (2022-06-24). Carpocrates, Marcellina, and Epiphanes: Three Early Christian Teachers of Alexandria and Rome. London: Routledge. ISBN 9781032285351.
