= Carpocrates =

2nd century Egyptian philosopher and gnostic

- Born: mid-late 1st century Alexandria, Egypt, Roman Empire
- Died: 2nd century Cephalonia, Epirus, Roman Empire
- Occupation: Leader of early Gnostic sect at Cephalonia
- Spouse: Alexandria of Cephalonia
- Children: Epiphanes
- Theological work
- Tradition or movement: Gnosticism
- Main interests: Christianity
- Notable ideas: Anamnesis, Antinomianism, Archons, the Demiurge, Reincarnation and Christian proto-communism

Carpocrates of Alexandria (Greek: Καρποκράτης) was the founder of an early Gnostic sect from the first half of the 2nd century, known as Carpocratians. As with many Gnostic sects, the Carpocratians are known only through the writings of the Church Fathers, principally Irenaeus of Lyon and Clement of Alexandria. As these writers strongly opposed Gnostic doctrine, there is a question of negative bias when using this source. While the various references to the Carpocratians differ in some details, they agree as to the libertinism of the sect, a charge commonly levied by pagans against Christians and conversely by Christians against pagans and heretics.

== Irenaeus ==
The earliest and most vivid account of Carpocrates and his followers comes from Irenaeus (died 202) in his Against Heresies including an account of the theology and practice of the sect.

Irenaeus wrote that the Carpocratians believed that Jesus was not divine; but because his soul was "steadfast and pure", he "remembered those things which he had witnessed within the sphere of the unbegotten God" (similar to Plato's concept of Anamnesis). Because of this, Jesus was able to free himself from the material powers (what other Gnostics call Archons, the Demiurge, etc.). Carpocratians believed they themselves could transcend the material realm, and therefore were no longer bound by Mosaic law, which was based on the material powers, or by any other morality, which they held was mere human opinion. Irenaeus offers this belief as an explanation of their licentious behaviour.

Irenaeus then goes on to provide his further, slightly different, explanation. The followers of Carpocrates, he says, believed that in order to leave this world, one's imprisoned eternal soul must pass through every possible condition of earthly life. Moreover, it is possible to do this within one lifetime. As a result, the Carpocratians did "all those things which we dare not either speak or hear of" so that when they died, they would not be compelled to incarnate again but would return to God. (Borges depicts a fictional sect with this belief in his short story "The Theologians".)

Irenaeus says that they practised various magical arts as well as leading a licentious life. He also says that they possessed a portrait of Christ, a painting they claimed had been made by Pontius Pilate during his lifetime, which they honoured along with images of Plato, Pythagoras and Aristotle "in the manner of the Gentiles".

Some early Christian authors opposed representational art, and statues and portraits and sculptures are crude and stylised. According to Robin Lane Fox: "Only one group of early Christians, the heretical Carpocratians, are known to have owned portraits of Christ". However, early Christian art from the early third century depicting Jesus is widespread and cannot be limited only to the Carpocratians. Furthermore, the fact that depictions of Jesus are mentioned by multiple early Christian authors, whether in a positive or negative manner, is an indication that these depictions were popular enough to be noticed and must have received the acceptance of some Christian authorities. Moreover, Christianity is rooted in Judaism, which generally forbids religious depictions, and the reluctance of some authors to accept depictions of Jesus could be ascribed to the Jewish roots of Christianity rather than to any non-Jewish Christian doctrine.

== Clement ==
Carpocrates is also mentioned by Clement of Alexandria in his Stromateis. Clement quotes extensively from On Righteousness which he says was written by Epiphanes, Carpocrates' son. No copy outside of Clement's citation exists, but the writing is of a strongly antinomian bent. It claims that differences in class and the ownership of property are unnatural, and argues for property and women to be held in common. Clement insists on the alleged licentiousness of the Carpocratians, claiming that at their Agape (meaning an early Christian gathering) they "have intercourse where they will and with whom they will".

According to Clement, Carpocrates was from Alexandria although his sect was primarily located in Cephallenia.

Carpocrates is again mentioned in the controversial Mar Saba letter (also called To Theodore), purportedly also by Clement of Alexandria, which was discovered by Morton Smith while cataloging books at the Monastery of Mar Saba in 1958. This document was examined by several other scholars in the preceding decades, including Quentin Quesnell. The letter details how Carpocrates obtained the copy of Secret Gospel of Mark:

But since the foul demons are always devising destruction for the race of men, Carpocrates, instructed by them and using deceitful arts, so enslaved a certain presbyter of the church in Alexandria that he got from him a copy of the secret Gospel, which he both interpreted according to his blasphemous and carnal doctrine and, moreover, polluted, mixing with the spotless and holy words utterly shameless lies. From this mixture is drawn off the teaching of the Carpocratians.

The letter mentions and quotes from the previously unknown Secret Mark, focusing on the episode where Jesus brings a youth back from the dead. The letter's writer (perhaps Clement) tells Theodore that the secret version of Mark does not contain references to "the many other [things about] which you wrote" including the specific phrase "naked with naked."

== Miscellaneous references ==
Other references to Carpocrates exist but are likely to be based on the two already cited.

Epiphanius of Salamis writes that

Carpocratians derived from a native of Asia, Carpocrates, who taught his followers to perform every obscenity and every sinful act. And unless one proceeds through all of them, he said, and fulfils the will of all demons and angels, he cannot mount to the highest heaven or get by the principalities and authorities.

Carpocrates is also mentioned by Tertullian and Hippolytus, both of whom seem to rely on Irenaeus; and also perhaps by Origen and Hegesippus.

Søren Kierkegaard mentioned them in his 1844 book, The Concept of Anxiety:

It is usually said that Judaism is the standpoint of the law. However, this could also be expressed by saying that Judaism lies in anxiety. But here the nothing of anxiety signifies something other than fate. It is in this sphere that the phrase “to be anxious-nothing” appears most paradoxical, for guilt is indeed something. Nevertheless, it is true that as long as guilt is the object of anxiety, it is nothing. The ambiguity lies in the relation, for as soon as guilt is posited, anxiety is gone, and repentance is there. The relation, as always with the relation of anxiety, is sympathetic and antipathetic. This in turn seems paradoxical, yet such is not the case, because while anxiety fears, it maintains a subtle communication with its object, cannot look away from it, indeed will not, for if the individual wills it, repentance is there. That someone or other will find this statement difficult is something I cannot help. He who has the required firmness to be, if I dare say so, a divine prosecutor, not in relation to others but in relation to himself, will not find it difficult. Furthermore, life offers sufficient phenomena in which the individual in anxiety gazes almost desirously at guilt and yet fears it. Guilt has for the eye of the spirit the fascinating power of the serpent’s glance. The truth in the Carpocratian view of attaining perfection through sin lies at this point. It has its truth in the moment of decision when the immediate spirit posits itself as spirit by spirit; contrariwise, it is blasphemy to hold that this view is to be realized in concreto. It is precisely by the anxiety of guilt that Judaism is further advanced than Greek culture, and the sympathetic factor in its anxiety-relation to guilt may be recognized by the fact that it would not at any price forego this relation in order to acquire the more rash expressions of Greek culture: fate, fortune, misfortune. p. 103-104

== See also ==
- Borborites
- Cainites
- Ebionites
- Epiphanes (gnostic)
- Fathers of Christian Gnosticism
- Gnosticism
- Marcellina (Gnostic)
- Neoplatonism and Gnosticism
- Salome (disciple)
