= Sarkic =

Lowest level of human nature in Gnosticism

Sarkic (Greek σάρξ, flesh or hylic, from the Greek ὕλη, stuff, or matter) in Gnosticism describes the lowest level of human nature—the fleshly, instinctive level. This is not the notion of body as opposed to thought; rather the sarkic level is said to be the lowest level of thought.

== Concepts ==
The concept of sarkic is used along with pneuma, which refers to spirit or soul, to describe the duality of Christ and also the Christian Church. Furthermore, such duality is used to explain the paradox of the identities of Adam and Eve.

There are thinkers such as Maximus the Confessor who associate sarkic (fleshly) with the somatic dimension (bodily) of human nature, the area where redemption must occur. There are, however, instances when they are considered near equivalent. But these states needed to be transcended to achieve a form of existence characterized by a heightened communion with God.

Sarkic is also used in Christian terms such as Paul's description of Abraham's children as sarkic children who have the pneuma of Christ. In his classification of humanity in his attempt to address the so-called "gentile problem", he labeled all as sarkic: sarkic Jews who have Christ's pneuma; sarkic Jews who lack Christ's pneuma; sarkic gentiles who have Christ's pneuma; and, sarkic gentiles who lack Christ's pneuma.

Paul also linked sarkic to the concept of hamartia, with the former serving as the force of the latter, capable of overcoming individual action and will.

== Popular culture ==
Sarkicism is a religion documented in SCP Foundation entries.
