= Quqites =

2nd-century Gnostic sect

The Quqites were a group who followed an Iranian type of Gnosticism in 2nd-century AD Erbil and in the vicinity of what is today northern Iraq. The sect was named after their founder Quq, known as "the potter".

The Quqite ideology arose in Edessa, Syria, in the 2nd century, and it is named for the founder Quq, which means "pitcher", or "jug". The Quqites stressed the Hebrew Bible, associated twelve prophets with twelve apostles, and held that the latter corresponded to the same number of gospels. Their beliefs seem eclectic, with elements of Judaism, Christianity, paganism, astrology, and Gnosticism.

The Jewish Christian group called the Ebionites used a Gospel of the Twelve, which is considered Quqite, and Marcion may have had some dealing with the Quqites. As late as 410, the Armenian bishop Marutha of Maipherkat included the Quqites in his catalog of heresies, a document he used as ammunition at the Synod of Seleukia-Ktesiphon in that year. Marutha names several characteristics of the Quqites, none of them reflecting particularly Mandaean ideas. A 6th-century presbyter of Nisibis (Syria), Barhad Besabba, also testifies to the Quqites, who, he says, mixed Chaldean wisdom with the Bible. They were likewise listed by Ephrem the Syrian along with Valentinians, followers of Bardaisan, and Manichaeans as local heresies.

== Sources ==
- Gillman, Ian and Hans-Joachim Klimkeit. Christians in Asia before 1500. (Ann Arbor: University of Michigan Press, 1999), p. 33
- H. J. W. Drijvers, Quq and the Quqites: An Unknown Sect in Edessa in the 2nd century AD., Numen, Vol. 14, Fasc. 2 (Jul., 1967), pp. 104–129; JSTOR's stable URL: https://www.jstor.org/stable/3269524
