= Alastair Logan =

Alastair Logan (A. H. B. Logan) is senior lecturer at the University of Exeter in England. He has been at the university since 1972 and is the longest standing member of its department of theology.

Dr Logan is a Christian scholar and the chair EFC at the Cathedral Church of Saint Peter in Exeter. He is known for his work regarding Gnosticism in early Christianity. His best-known published work is Gnostic Truth, Christian Heresy, in which he works to redact the Gnostic movement in early Christianity. Logan ties the Gnostic movement to the worship of Seth and contends that the main thrust of the different factions was a rebellion against the religion or religions of the Empires in the Ancient World.
