= Epiphanes (Gnostic) =

- Born: late 1st century - early 2nd century Cephalonia
- Died: 2nd century (aged 17); Cephalonia
- Notable work: On Righteousness
- Theological work
- Tradition or movement: Gnosticism
- Notable ideas: Christian proto-communism, Free love, Monad

Epiphanes was reputedly the author of On Righteousness, a notable early Gnostic literary work that promotes early socialist principles, that was quoted and discussed by Clement of Alexandria, in Stromaties, III. Epiphanes was also attributed with founding Monadic Gnosis. G.R.S. Mead however thinks that Epiphanes was a legend and may not have been an actual person, that the real author of On Righteousness may be the Valentinian, Marcus.

According to Clement, Epiphanes was born on Cephalonia in the late 1st Century or early 2nd Century to Carpocrates (his father), and Alexandria of Cephalonia (his mother). Epiphanes died at the age of 17. Clement wrote that Epiphanes was "worshipped as a god with the most elaborate and lascivious rites by the Cephalonians, in the great temple of Samē, on the day of the new moon.". Mead discusses that the idea of temple worship is probably a misunderstanding, that Clement may have mistaken the worship of the moon god Epiphanes with a person of the same name. The Epiphany was a sun-moon festival at the Samē temple. The new moon's life of 17 days (in the lunar cycle) may have been misunderstood as Epiphanes' 17 years of life..

On the other hand, Vanderbilt Professor Kathy L. Gaca (The Making of Fornication: Eros, Ethics, and Political Reform in Greek Philosophy and Early Christianity, University of California Press, 2003) promotes a view of Epiphanes as one of the voices in early Christianity who held a positive and liberationist view of sexual pleasure, and who was among those like him who were ultimately silenced by the victorious leadership represented by Clement of Alexandria, Tatian, Ambrose, Jerome and Augustine.

Another legend that Epiphanes led Monadic Gnosis, may have come from misunderstanding of the Greek word eiphanes which may have been mistaken as a personal name if in text, when in fact the Greek means distinguished, as in a distinguished teacher.

== On Righteousness ==
A notable belief attributed to Epiphanes and described in On Righteousness was the idea of communal living or communitarianism, including shared property and spouses. The text begins: "The righteousness of God is a kind of sharing along with equality." The idea of communal living may have come from Plato's ideas in The Republic. Clement took this very seriously as a sign of libertine promiscuity, but the real followers were likely to be more philosophical and merely observant of the Early Christian practice of Agape, communal feasts and property.

Roel van den Broek argues that this text should not be considered Gnostic. It does not mention or allude to multiple creators or a fallen Demiurge, and its argument is based on the goodness of the material world.
