= Stratiotici =

The Stratiotici were a gnostic sect, a subgroup of the Borborites. Little else is known about them besides what the Church Fathers wrote on them.

== Description ==
The sect were a sub-group of the Borborians, of which the Coddians, Stratiotici and the Phibiomites had together a family connection to Gnostics. The name deriving from stratos which in the Greek language meant army, or soldierly (soldiers of (Walker 1983)) as a translation from the Latin. The names attributed to sects were possibly only those given by their enemies. Little is known of the sect as rituals were practised in secrecy, scriptures were unwritten by the practitioners, resulting on the necessary reliance of accounts of their practice in the writings of the holy church fathers.

They serve up lavish helpings of meat and wine, even if they are poor. Then, when they have had their drinking-party and so to speak filled their veins to satiety, they give them-selves over to passion.... The husband withdraws from his wife, and says {to her}: 'Rise up, make love with the brother.'... When they have had intercourse out of the passion of fornication, then, holding up their own blasphemy before heaven, the woman and the man take the man's emission [semen] into their own hands, and stand there looking up toward heaven.And while they have uncleanliness in their hands they pray... (Statement of the practise of Stratiotici made by a Church Father in text by Robert K. Moffett)

== Insight ==
The sect and other self defining gnostics were the subject of criticism by the Church Fathers, these finding evidence of heresy and blasphemy caused by a corruption of the truth of Christian doctrine. This the fathers may have attributed to the former weight of their ancestral sin or the result of persons with unclean spirits.
