= Gnosticism =

Early Christian and Jewish religious systems

Gnosticism is a collection of different religious and philosophical ideas and systems that fully developed by the mid-second century among sects of early Christianity and other faiths. It is not a singular, homogeneous tradition or religion, but an umbrella term used by modern scholars to describe different groups and beliefs that shared certain characteristics.

These diverse Gnostic groups generally emphasized personal spiritual knowledge (gnosis) above the authority, traditions, and proto-orthodox teachings of organized religious institutions. The Gnostic worldview typically distinguished between a hidden, uncorrupted supreme being and an inherently corrupt or flawed demiurge (identified and equivalent with Yahweh in the Hebrew Bible, via the Apocryphon of John), responsible for creating material reality and the observable universe. Gnostics held this material existence to be corrupted and believed the principal element of salvation was direct knowledge of your own divine origin, attained via mystical or esoteric insight. Many Gnostic texts deal not in concepts of sin and repentance, but with ignorance, illusion and enlightenment.

Although the exact origins of Gnosticism cannot be traced, Gnostic writings flourished among certain Christian groups in the Mediterranean during the second century. In the Gnostic Christian tradition, Christ was generally seen as a divine agent that had descended upon a human form, in order to lead humanity back to recognition of its own divine nature. Judean–Israelite Gnosticism, including the Mandaeans and Elkesaites, blended Jewish–Christian ideas with Gnostic beliefs focused on baptism and the cosmic struggle between light and darkness. Syriac–Egyptian groups like the Sethians and Valentinians combined Platonic philosophy and Christian themes, seeing the material world as flawed but not wholly evil. Other traditions include the Basilideans, Marcionists, and Thomasines. Manichaeism, whose prophet grew up Christian-Jewish, adopted Buddhist and Hindu concepts such as cosmic dualism paired with nondualism simultaneously, and Gnostic teachings of ignorance emerged as a major religious movement in the third century, briefly rivaling Christianity.

Early Church Fathers denounced Gnostic ideas as heresy, although early Gnostic sects and teachers such as Valentinus saw themselves as Christians, for their same belief in the archetypal spiritual son. Efforts to destroy Gnostic texts were largely successful, resulting in the survival of very little writing by Gnostic thinkers and theologians. After declining in the western Mediterranean, Gnosticism persisted in the Near East until at least the sixth century, remaining influential as far as China until the late ninth century. Gnostic ideas resurfaced periodically in medieval European Christian groups like the Paulicians, Bogomils, and Cathars. Islamic and Kabbalistic thought also reflect some Gnostic ideas, while modern revivals and discoveries of Gnostic texts have influenced numerous thinkers and churches up to the present day. Gnosticism survives through Mandaeism, an ancient Middle Eastern religion sometimes described as a Gnostic sect or tradition. The second contemporary religion that may be regarded as a continuation of ancient Gnosticism, particularly Sethianism and Ophitism, is Yezidism, originally practised in northern Mesopotamia, between Mosul, Mount Sinjar and Mardin.

For centuries, most scholarly knowledge about Gnosticism was limited to the biased, anti-heretical, and often incomplete writings of early Christian figures such as Irenaeus of Lyons and Hippolytus of Rome. There has been a renewed interest in Gnosticism since the 1945 discovery in Egypt of the Nag Hammadi library, a collection of rare early Christian and Gnostic texts. Surviving Gnostic writings, such as the Gospel of Thomas and the Apocryphon of John, reveal a very diverse and complex early Christian landscape. Some scholars believe Gnosticism may contain historical information about Jesus from the Gnostic viewpoint, although the majority conclude that apocryphal sources, Gnostic or not, are later than the canonical sources or may have depended on or used the Synoptic Gospels. Elaine Pagels has noted the influence of sources from Hellenistic Judaism, Zoroastrianism, and Middle Platonism on the Nag Hammadi texts.

Since the 1990s, scholars have debated whether "Gnosticism" is a form of early Christianity, an artificial category created by early orthodox Christians to label heresies, or a distinct religious tradition in its own right. Academic studies of Gnosticism have evolved from viewing it as a Christian heresy or Greek-influenced aberration to recognizing it as a diverse set of movements with complex Jewish, Persian, and philosophical roots. Consequently, modern scholars question the usefulness of "Gnosticism" as a unified category and favor more precise classifications based on texts, traditions, and socio-religious contexts.

== Etymology ==
Gnosis is a feminine Greek noun which means "knowledge" or "awareness". It and the associated verb are often used for personal knowledge, as compared with intellectual knowledge (Greek verb εἴδειν eídein). A related term is the adjective gnostikos, "of or for knowledge", a reasonably common adjective in Classical Greek.

By the Hellenistic period, it began also to be associated with Greco-Roman mystery cults becoming synonymous with the Greek term mysterion. Consequentially, Gnosis often refers to knowledge based on personal experience or perception. In a religious context, gnosis is mystical or esoteric knowledge based on direct participation with the divine. In most Gnostic systems, the sufficient cause of salvation is this "knowledge of" ("acquaintance with") the divine. It is an inward "knowing", comparable to that encouraged by Plotinus (neoplatonism), although gnosticism obviously isn't strictly platonic. Gnostics are "those who are oriented toward knowledge and understanding– or perception and learning– as a particular modality for living". The usual meaning of gnostikos in Classical Greek texts is "learned" or "intellectual", such as used by Plato in the comparison of "practical" (praktikos) and "intellectual" (gnostikos). (Note: In Plato's dialogue between Young Socrates and the Foreigner in his The Statesman (258e).) (Note: perseus.tufts.edu, LSJ entry: γνωστ-ικός, ή, όν, A. of or for knowing, cognitive: ἡ -κή (sc. ἐπιστήμη), theoretical science (opp. πρακτική), Pl.Plt.258e, etc.; τὸ γ. ib.261b; "ἕξεις γ." Arist.AP0.100a11 (Comp.); "γ. εἰκόνες" Hierocl.in CA25p.475M.: c. gen., able to discern, Ocell. 2.7. Adv. "-κῶς" Procl.Inst.39, Dam.Pr.79, Phlp.in Ph.241.22. (Note: perseus.tufts.edu, LSJ entry)) Plato's use of "learned" is fairly typical of Classical texts. (Note: 10x Plato, Cratylus, Theaetetus, Sophist, Statesman 2x Plutarch, Compendium libri de animae procreatione + De animae procreatione in Timaeo, 2x Pseudo-Plutarch, De musica (Note: perseus.tufts.edu, Gnostikos))

Sometimes employed in the Septuagint translation of the Hebrew Bible, the adjective is not used in the New Testament, but Clement of Alexandria (Note: In Book 7 of his Stromateis) who speaks of the "learned" (gnostikos) Christian quite often, uses it in complimentary terms. The use of gnostikos in relation to heresy originates with interpreters of Irenaeus. Some scholars (Note: For example A. Rousseau and L. Doutreleau, translators of the French edition (1974)) consider that Irenaeus sometimes uses gnostikos to simply mean "intellectual", whereas his mention of "the intellectual sect" (Note: Adv. haer. 1.11.1) is a specific designation. (Note: Irenaeus' comparative adjective gnostikeron "more learned", evidently cannot mean "more Gnostic" as a name.) (Note: Williams, p. 36: "But several of Irenaeus's uses of the designation gnostikos are more ambiguous, and it is not so clear whether he is indicating the specific sect again or using 'gnostics' now merely as a shorthand reference for virtually all of the groups he is criticizing"; p. 37: "They argue that Irenaeus uses gnostikos in two senses: (1) with the term's 'basic and customary meaning' of 'learned' (savant), and (2) with reference to adherents of the specific sect called 'the gnostic heresy' in Adv. haer. 1.11.1."; p. 271: "1.25.6 where they think that gnostikos means 'learned' are in 1.11.3 ('A certain other famous teacher of theirs, reaching for a doctrine more lofty and learned [gnostikoteron] ...') and 1.11.5 ('... in order that they [i.e.,]).") (Note: Of those groups that Irenaeus identifies as "intellectual" (gnostikos), only one, the followers of Marcellina use the term gnostikos of themselves. (Note: Williams: "On the other hand, the one group whom Irenaeus does explicitly mention as users of this self-designation, the followers of the Second Century teacher Marcellina, are not included in Layton's anthology at all, on the grounds that their doctrines are not similar to those of the "classic" gnostics. As we have seen, Epiphanius is one of the witnesses for the existence of a special sect called 'the gnostics', and yet Epiphanius himself seems to distinguish between these people and 'the Sethians' (Pan 40.7.5), whereas Layton treats them as both under the 'classic gnostic' category.") Later Hippolytus uses "learned" (gnostikos) of Cerinthus and the Ebionites, and Epiphanius applied "learned" (gnostikos) to specific groups.) The term "Gnosticism" does not appear in ancient sources, (Note: Dunderberg: "The problems with the term 'Gnosticism' itself are now well known. It does not appear in ancient sources at all") and was first coined in the 17th century by Henry More in a commentary on the seven letters of the Book of Revelation, where More used the term "Gnosticisme" to describe the heresy in Thyatira. (Note: Pearson: "As Bentley Layton points out, the term Gnosticism was first coined by Henry More (1614–1687) in an expository work on the seven letters of the Book of Revelation.29 More used the term Gnosticisme to describe the heresy in Thyatira.") The term Gnosticism was derived from the use of the Greek adjective gnostikos (Greek γνωστικός, "learned", "intellectual") by St. Irenaeus (c. 185 AD) to describe the school of Valentinus as he legomene gnostike haeresis "the heresy called Learned (gnostic)". (Note: This occurs in the context of Irenaeus' work On the Detection and Overthrow of the So-Called Gnosis, (Greek: elenchos kai anatrope tes pseudonymou gnoseos, ἔλεγχος καὶ ἀνατροπὴ τῆς ψευδωνύμου γνώσεως) where the term "knowledge falsely so-called" (pseudonymos gnosis) is a quotation of the apostle Paul's warning against "knowledge falsely so-called" in 1 Timothy 6:20, and covers various groups, not just Valentinus.)

== Origins ==
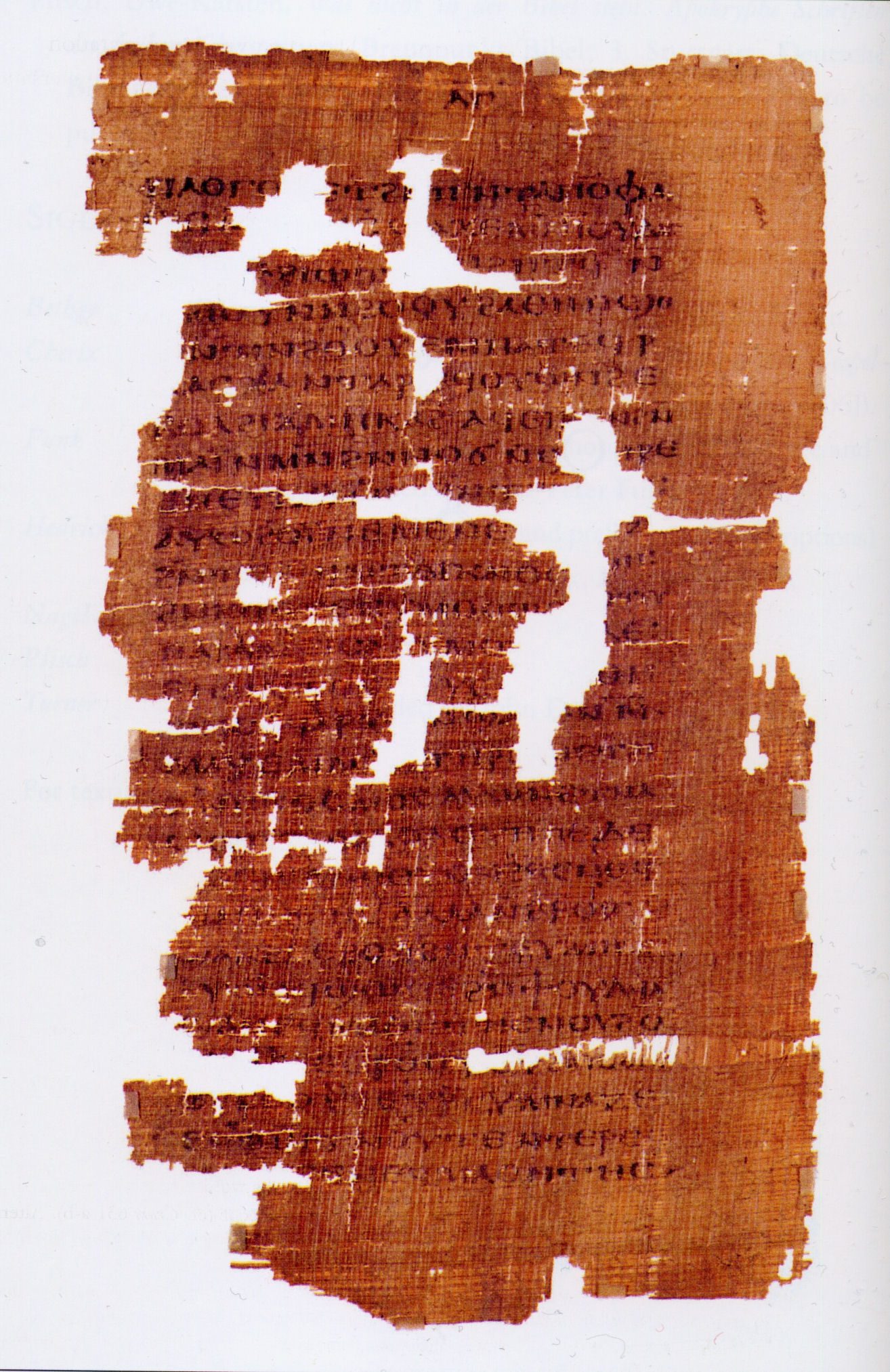
Page from the Gospel of Judas

The origins of Gnosticism are obscure and still disputed. Alexandria was central to the birth of Gnosticism. Gnosticism is strongly influenced by Middle Platonism and its theory of forms. Elaine Pagels has noted the influence of sources from Hellenistic Judaism, Zoroastrianism, and Middle Platonism on the Nag Hammadi texts. The Christian ecclesia (Ancient Greek: ἐκκλησία, lit. 'assembly') originated within Jewish Christianity, but also attracted Greek members, and various strands of thought were available, such as "Judaic apocalypticism, speculation on divine Wisdom, Greek philosophy, and Hellenistic mystery religions." The proto-orthodox Christian groups called Gnostics a heresy of Christianity. (Note: Clement of Alexandria: "In the times of the Emperor Hadrian appeared those who devised heresies, and they continued until the age of the elder Antoninus", giving Basilides and Valentinus as examples)

While rejecting the underlying framing that proto-orthodox Christianity is the 'original' and 'true' Christianity from which Gnosticism and other so-called 'heresies' then deviated, scholars such as Simone Pétrement and David Brakke have argued that Gnosticism originated as an intra-Christian movement, being one of several responses to the life, death, and presumed resurrection of Jesus, with Pétrement tracing it specifically to tendencies in the letters of Paul and the Gospel of John. Within early Christianity, the teachings of Paul the Apostle and John the Evangelist may have been a starting point for Gnostic ideas, with a growing emphasis on the opposition between flesh and spirit, the value of charisma, and the disqualification of Jewish law (Halakha). The mortal body belonged to the world of inferior, worldly powers (the archons), and only the spirit or soul could be saved. The term gnostikos (γνωστικός, 'knowing') may have acquired a deeper significance here.

Other modern scholars hold that Gnosticism arose within Second Temple Judaism and later incorporated stories about Jesus into pre-existing speculation about a cosmic savior and Philo's contemporary Jewish interpretation of Middle Platonic thought about the demiurge and the logos. (Note: Cohen & Mendes-Flohr: "Recent research, however, has tended to emphasize that Judaism, rather than Persia, was a major origin of Gnosticism. Indeed, it appears increasingly evident that many of the newly published Gnostic texts were written in a context from which Jews were not absent. In some cases, indeed, a violent rejection of the Jewish God, or of Judaism, seems to stand at the basis of these texts. ... Prima facie, various trends in Jewish thought and literature of the Second Commonwealth appear to have been potential factors in Gnostic origins.) A small minority of scholars debate Gnosticism's origins as having roots in Buddhism, given some similarities in beliefs.

Some scholars prefer to speak of "gnosis" when referring to first-century CE ideas that later developed into Gnosticism, and to reserve the term "Gnosticism" for the synthesis of these ideas into a coherent movement in the second century. According to James M. Robinson, no Gnostic texts clearly predate Christianity, (Note: Robinson: "At this stage we have not found any Gnostic texts that clearly antedate the origin of Christianity." J. M. Robinson, "Sethians and Johannine Thought: The Trimorphic Protennoia and the Prologue of the Gospel of John" in The Rediscovery of Gnosticism, vol. 2, Sethian Gnosticism, ed. B. Layton (Leiden: E.J. Brill, 1981), p. 662.) and "pre-Christian Gnosticism as such is hardly attested in a way to settle the debate once and for all."

=== Jewish Christian origins ===
Recent scholarship has emphasized the origins of Gnosticism within Judaism rather than in Persia. E. S. Drower argues, "heterodox Judaism in Galilee and Samaria appears to have taken shape in the form we now call Gnostic, and it may well have existed some time before the Christian era."

Many heads of Gnostic schools were identified by the Church Fathers as Jewish Christians, and Hebrew words and names of God were used in some Gnostic systems. The cosmogonic speculations among Christian Gnostics had partial origins in Maaseh Breshit and Maaseh Merkabah. This thesis is most notably put forward by historians Gershom Scholem (1897–1982) and Gilles Quispel (1916–2006). Scholem detected Jewish gnosis in the imagery of merkabah mysticism, which can also be found in certain Gnostic documents. Quispel viewed Gnosticism as an independent Jewish development, tracing its origins to Alexandrian Jews (to whom Valentinus was also connected).

Many of the Nag Hammadi texts make reference to stories and characters from the Hebrew Bible, in some cases with a violent rejection of the Jewish God. Gershom Scholem once described Gnosticism as "the greatest case of metaphysical anti-Semitism", though modern Jewish scholar Steven Bayme argues Gnosticism would be better characterized as anti-Judaism. However, recent research into the origins of Gnosticism shows a strong Jewish influence, particularly from Hekhalot literature.

=== Angel christology ===
Regarding the angel Christology of some early Christians, Darrell Hannah notes:

[Some] early Christians understood the pre-incarnate Christ, ontologically, as an angel. This "true" angel Christology took many forms and may have appeared as early as the late First Century, if indeed this is the view opposed in the early chapters of the Epistle to the Hebrews. The Elchasaites, or at least Christians influenced by them, paired the male Christ with the female Holy Spirit, envisioning both as two gigantic angels. Some Valentinian Gnostics supposed that Christ took on an angelic nature and that he might be the Saviour of angels. The author of the Testament of Solomon held Christ to be a particularly effective "thwarting" angel in the exorcism of demons. The author of De Centesima and Epiphanius' "Ebionites" held Christ to have been the highest and most important of the first created archangels, a view similar in many respects to Hermas' equation of Christ with Michael. Finally, a possible exegetical tradition behind the Ascension of Isaiah and attested by Origen's Hebrew master, may witness to yet another angel Christology, as well as an angel Pneumatology.

The pseudepigraphal Christian text Ascension of Isaiah identifies Jesus with angel Christology:

[The Lord Christ is commissioned by the Father] And I heard the voice of the Most High, the father of my LORD as he said to my LORD Christ who will be called Jesus, 'Go out and descend through all the heavens...

The Shepherd of Hermas is a Christian literary work considered as canonical scripture by some of the early Church fathers such as Irenaeus. Jesus is identified with angel Christology in parable 5, when the author mentions a Son of God, as a virtuous man filled with a Holy "pre-existent spirit".

=== Platonic influences ===
In the 1880s, Gnostic connections with Platonism were proposed. Ugo Bianchi, who organised the Congress of Messina of 1966 on the origins of Gnosticism, also argued for Orphic and Platonic origins. Gnostics borrowed significant ideas and terms from Platonism, using Greek philosophical concepts throughout their text, including such concepts as hypostasis (reality, existence), ousia (essence, substance, being), and demiurge (creator God). Both Sethian Gnostics and Valentinian Gnostics seem to have been influenced by Plato, Middle Platonism, and Neopythagorean academies or schools of thought. Both schools attempted "an effort towards conciliation, even affiliation" with late antique philosophy.

The Gnostics were strongly opposed by Plotinus and later Neoplatonists, who rejected their radical dualism and pessimistic view of creation. In his work Against the Gnostics (Enneads II.9), Plotinus criticized Gnostic cosmology, arguing that the material world was not inherently evil but rather a reflection of the One through a series of divine emanations. Neoplatonists such as Porphyry and Proclus continued this critique, defending the Demiurge as a benevolent force and emphasizing the soul's ascent to the divine through intellectual and contemplative purification, rather than through esoteric knowledge (gnosis) alone. While Neoplatonism retained some mystical and hierarchical elements that paralleled Gnostic thought, it ultimately positioned itself as an alternative, philosophical path to transcendence that was rooted in classical Greek rationalism rather than Gnostic revelation.

=== Persian origins or influences ===
Early research into the origins of Gnosticism proposed Persian origins or influences, which spread to Europe and incorporated Jewish elements. According to Wilhelm Bousset (1865–1920), Gnosticism was a form of Iranian and Mesopotamian syncretism, and Richard August Reitzenstein (1861–1931) situated the origins of Gnosticism in Persia.

Carsten Colpe (b. 1929) has analyzed and criticised the Iranian hypothesis of Reitzenstein, showing that many of his hypotheses are untenable. Nevertheless, Geo Widengren (1907–1996) argued for the origin of Mandaean Gnosticism in Mazdean (Zoroastrian) Zurvanism, in conjunction with ideas from the Aramaic Mesopotamian world.

However, scholars specializing in Mandaeism such as Kurt Rudolph, Mark Lidzbarski, Rudolf Macúch, Ethel S. Drower, James F. McGrath, Charles G. Häberl, Jorunn Jacobsen Buckley, and Şinasi Gündüz argue for a Judean–Israelite origin. The majority of these scholars believe that the Mandaeans likely have a historical connection with John the Baptist's inner circle of disciples. Charles Häberl, who is also a linguist specializing in Mandaic, finds Palestinian and Samaritan Aramaic influence on Mandaic and accepts Mandaeans having a "shared Palestinian history with Jews".

=== Buddhist parallels ===
In 1966, at the Congress of Median, Buddhologist Edward Conze noted phenomenological commonalities between Mahayana Buddhism and Gnosticism, in his paper Buddhism and Gnosis, following an early suggestion put forward by Isaac Jacob Schmidt. (Note: The idea that Gnosticism was derived from Buddhism was first proposed by the Victorian gem collector and numismatist Charles William King (1864). Mansel (1875) considered the principal sources of Gnosticism to be Platonism, Zoroastrianism, and Buddhism.) The influence of Buddhism in any sense on either the Gnostikos Valentinus (c. 170) or the Nag Hammadi texts (3rd century) is not supported by modern scholarship, although Elaine Pagels called it a "possibility".

== Characteristics ==
=== Cosmology ===
The Syrian–Egyptian traditions postulate a remote, supreme Godhead, the Monad. From this highest divinity emanate lower divine beings, known as Aeons. The Demiurge arises among the Aeons and creates the physical world. Divine elements "fall" into the material realm and are latent in human beings. Redemption from the fall occurs when humans obtain Gnosis, esoteric or intuitive knowledge of the divine.

=== Dualism and monism ===
Gnostic systems postulate a dualism between God and the world, varying from the "radical dualist" systems of Manichaeism to the "mitigated dualism" of classic Gnostic movements. Radical dualism, or absolute dualism, posits two coequal divine forces, while in mitigated dualism one of the two principles is in some way inferior to the other. In qualified monism the second entity may be divine or semi-divine. Valentinian Gnosticism is a form of monism, expressed in terms previously used in a dualistic manner.

=== Moral and ritual practice ===
Gnostics tended toward asceticism, especially in their sexual and dietary practice. In other areas of morality, Gnostics were less rigorously ascetic and took a more moderate approach to correct behavior. In normative early Christianity, the Church administered and prescribed the correct behavior for Christians, while in Gnosticism, it was the internalized motivation that was important. Ptolemy's Epistle to Flora described limited fasting, but maintained that true "spiritual" fasting would be to refrain from everything bad. (Note: Ptolemy, in Letter to Flora: "External physical fasting is observed even among our followers, for it can be of some benefit to the soul if it is engaged in with reason (logos), whenever it is done neither by way of imitating others, nor out of habit, nor because of the day, as if it had been specially appointed for that purpose.") For example, ritualistic behavior was not seen to possess as much importance as other practices, unless it was based on a personal, internal motivation.

=== Female representation ===
The role women played in Gnosticism is still being explored. The very few women in most Gnostic literature are portrayed as chaotic, disobedient, and enigmatic. However, the Nag Hammadi texts place women in roles of leadership and heroism.

== Concepts ==
=== Monad ===
In many Gnostic systems, God is known as the Monad, the One. (Note: Other names include The Absolute, Aion teleos (The Perfect Æon), Bythos (Depth or Profundity, Βυθός), Proarkhe (Before the Beginning, προαρχή), and He Arkhe (The Beginning, ἡ ἀρχή).) God is the high source of the pleroma, the region of light. The various emanations of God are called æons. According to Hippolytus, this view was inspired by the Pythagoreans, who called the first thing that came into existence the Monad, which begat the dyad, which begat the numbers, which begat the point, begetting lines, etc.

=== Pleroma ===
Pleroma (Greek πλήρωμα, "fullness") refers to the totality of God's powers. The heavenly pleroma is the center of divine life, a region of light "above" (the term is not to be understood spatially) our world, occupied by spiritual beings such as aeons (eternal beings) and sometimes archons. Jesus is interpreted as an intermediary aeon who was sent from the pleroma, with whose aid humanity can recover the lost knowledge of its divine origins. The term is thus a central element of Gnostic cosmology.

The term pleroma is also used in the general Greek language, and it is used by the Greek Orthodox church in this general form, since the word appears in the Epistle to the Colossians. Proponents of the view that Paul was actually a Gnostic, such as Elaine Pagels, interpret the reference in Colossians as a term that must be understood in a Gnostic sense.

=== Emanation ===
The Supreme Light or Consciousness descends through a series of stages, gradations, worlds, or hypostases, becoming progressively more material and embodied. In time, it will turn around to return to the One (epistrophe), retracing its steps through spiritual knowledge and contemplation.

=== Aeon ===
In many Gnostic systems, the aeons are the various emanations of the superior God or Monad. Beginning in certain Gnostic texts with the hermaphroditic aeon Barbelo, the first emanated being, various interactions with the Monad occur which result in the emanation of successive pairs of aeons, often in male–female pairings called syzygies. The numbers of these pairings varied from text to text, though some identify their number as being thirty. The aeons as a totality constitute the pleroma, the "region of light". The lowest regions of the pleroma are closest to the darkness, that is, the physical world.

Two of the most commonly paired æons were Christ and Sophia (Greek: "Wisdom"); the latter refers to Christ as her "consort" in A Valentinian Exposition.

=== Sophia ===
In Gnostic tradition, the name Sophia (Σοφία, Greek for "wisdom") refers to the final emanation of God, and is identified with the anima mundi or world-soul. She is occasionally referred to by the Hebrew equivalent of Achamoth (this is a feature of Ptolemy's version of the Valentinian Gnostic myth). Jewish Gnosticism with a focus on Sophia was active by 90 AD. In most, if not all, versions of the Gnostic myth, Sophia gives birth to the demiurge, who in turn brings about the creation of materiality. The positive and negative depictions of materiality depend on the myth's depictions of Sophia's actions. Sophia is described as unruly and disobedient, which is due to her bringing a creation of chaos into the world. The creation of the Demiurge was an act done without her counterpart's consent. Because of the predefined hierarchy between them, this action contributed to the narrative that she was unruly and disobedient.

Sophia, emanating without her partner, resulted in the production of the Demiurge (Greek: lit. "public builder"), who is also referred to as Yaldabaoth and variations thereof in some Gnostic texts. This creature is concealed outside the pleroma; in isolation, and thinking itself alone, it creates materiality and a host of co-actors, referred to as archons. The demiurge is responsible for creating humanity, trapping elements of the pleroma stolen from Sophia within human bodies. In response, the Godhead emanates two savior aeons, Christ and the Holy Spirit; Christ then takes on material form in the figure of Jesus, in an act of divine embodiment, in order to teach humans how to achieve gnosis, by which they may return to the pleroma.

=== Demiurge ===
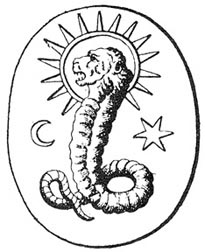
A lion-faced, serpentine deity found on a Gnostic gem in Bernard de Montfaucon's L'antiquité expliquée et représentée en figures, a depiction of Yaldabaoth

The term demiurge derives from the Latinized form of the Greek term dēmiourgos, δημιουργός, literally "public or skilled worker". (Note: The term dēmiourgos occurs in a number of other religious and philosophical systems, most notably Platonism. The Gnostic demiurge bears a resemblance to figures in Plato's Timaeus and Republic. In Timaeus, the demiourgós is a central figure, a benevolent creator of the universe who works to make it as benevolent as the limitations of matter allow. In The Republic the description of the leontomorphic "desire" in Socrates' model of the psyche bears a resemblance to descriptions of the demiurge as being in the shape of the lion. (Note: The relevant passage of The Republic was found within the Nag Hammadi library, wherein a text existed describing the demiurge as a "lion-faced serpent".)) This figure is also called "Yaldabaoth", "Saklas" (Syriac: sækla, "the foolish one"), or "Samael" (Aramaic: sæmʻa-ʼel, "blind god"), who is sometimes ignorant of the superior god, and sometimes opposed to it; thus in the latter case he is correspondingly malevolent. Other names or identifications are Ahriman, El, Satan, and Yahweh.

The demiurge creates the physical universe and the physical aspect of human nature. The demiurge typically creates a group of co-actors named archons who preside over the material realm and, in some cases, present obstacles to the soul seeking ascent from it. The inferiority of the demiurge's creation may be compared to the technical inferiority of a work of art, painting, sculpture, etc., to the thing the art represents. In other cases, Gnosticism takes on a more ascetic tendency to view material existence negatively, which then becomes more extreme when materiality, including the human body, is perceived as evil and constrictive, a deliberate prison for its inhabitants.

Moral judgments of the demiurge vary from group to group within the broad category of Gnosticism, ranging from viewing materiality as inherently evil to seeing it as merely flawed, as good as its passive constituent matter allows.

=== Archon ===
In late antiquity, some variants of Gnosticism used the term archon to refer to several servants of the demiurge. According to Origen's Contra Celsum, a sect called the Ophites posited the existence of seven archons, beginning with Iadabaoth or Ialdabaoth, who created the six that follow: Iao, Sabaoth, Adonaios, Elaios, Astaphanos, and Horaios. Ialdabaoth had a head of a lion.

=== Other concepts ===
Other Gnostic concepts are:

- sarkic – earthly, hidebound, ignorant, uninitiated. The lowest level of human thought is the fleshly, instinctive level of thinking.
- hylic – lowest order of the three types of humans. They cannot be saved, since their thinking is entirely material and incapable of understanding the gnosis.
- psychic – "soulful", partially initiated. Matter-dwelling spirits
- pneumatic – "spiritual", fully initiated, immaterial souls escaping the doom of the material world via gnosis.
- kenoma – the visible or manifest cosmos, "lower" than the pleroma
- charisma – gift, or energy, bestowed by pneumatics through oral teaching and personal encounters
- logos – the divine ordering principle of the cosmos; personified as Christ.
- hypostasis – literally "that which stands beneath" the inner reality, emanation (appearance) of God, known to psychics
- ousia – the essence of God, known to pneumatics. Specific individual things or being.

== Jesus as a Gnostic saviour ==
Jesus is identified by some Gnostics as an emanation of the supreme being who descended to the Earth to bring gnōsis to humanity, while others adamantly denied that the supreme being ever took on flesh, claiming Jesus to be merely a human mystic who attained enlightenment through gnosis and taught his disciples to do the same. Others believed that Jesus was divine, but did not have a physical body being of pure spirit, reflected in the later Docetist movement. Among the Mandaeans, Jesus was considered a mšiha kdaba or "false messiah" who perverted the teachings entrusted to him by John the Baptist. Still other traditions identify Mani, the founder of Manichaeism, and Seth, third son of Adam and Eve, as salvific figures.

== Development ==
Perkins suggests a tripartite periodization for the development of Gnosticism. Perkins argues for a late-first to early second century development of Gnostic ideas contemporary to the New Testament, but while some scholars still claim Gnostic tendencies in John, such a paradigm is likely flawed given that the oldest text certainly known to be Gnostic, the Apocrypha of John, is from the mid-second century. Christian Gnosticism did not fully develop until the mid-2nd century, when 2nd-century Proto-Orthodox Christians concentrated much effort in examining and trying to refute it. The mid-second century to early third century saw the high point of the classical Gnostic teachers and their systems, "who claimed that their systems represented the inner truth revealed by Jesus." From the end of the second century to the fourth century, a reaction by the proto-orthodox church and condemnation as heresy led to a subsequent decline.

During the first period, three types of tradition developed:

- Genesis was reinterpreted in Jewish milieux, viewing Yahweh as a jealous God who enslaved people; freedom was to be obtained from this jealous God;
- A wisdom tradition developed, in which Jesus' sayings were interpreted as pointers to an esoteric wisdom, in which the soul could be divinized through identification with wisdom. (Note: According to Earl Doherty, a prominent proponent of the Christ myth theory, the Q-authors may have regarded themselves as "spokespersons for the Wisdom of God", with Jesus being the embodiment of this Wisdom. In time, the gospel-narrative of this embodiment of Wisdom became interpreted as the literal history of the life of Jesus.) Some of Jesus' sayings may have been incorporated into the gospels to put a limit on this development. The conflicts described in 1 Corinthians may have been inspired by a clash between this wisdom tradition and Paul's gospel of crucifixion and resurrection;
- A mythical story developed about the descent of a heavenly creature to reveal the Divine world as the true home of human beings. Jewish Christianity saw the Messiah, or Christ, as "an eternal aspect of God's hidden nature, his "spirit" and "truth", who revealed himself throughout sacred history".

The movement spread in areas controlled by the Roman Empire and Arian Goths, and the Persian Empire. It continued to develop in the Mediterranean and Middle East before and during the 2nd and 3rd centuries, but decline also set in during the third century, due to the rise of proto-orthodoxy and the economic and cultural deterioration of the Roman Empire. Conversion to Islam, and the Albigensian Crusade (1209–1229), greatly reduced the remaining number of Gnostics throughout the Middle Ages, though Mandaean communities still exist in Iraq, Iran and diaspora communities. Gnostic and pseudo-Gnostic ideas became influential in some of the philosophies of various esoteric mystical movements of the 19th and 20th centuries in Europe and North America, including some that explicitly identify themselves as revivals or even continuations of earlier Gnostic groups.

== Relation with early Christianity ==
Dillon notes that Gnosticism raises questions about the development of early Christianity.

=== Orthodoxy and heresy ===
The Christian heresiologists, most notably Irenaeus, regarded Gnosticism as a Christian heresy. Modern scholarship notes that early Christianity was diverse, and Christian orthodoxy only settled in the 4th century, when the Roman Empire declined and Gnosticism lost its influence. Gnostics and proto-orthodox Christians shared some terminology. Initially, they were hard to distinguish from each other.

According to Walter Bauer, "heresies" may well have been the original form of Christianity in many regions. This theme was further developed by Elaine Pagels, who argues that "the proto-orthodox church found itself in debates with Gnostic Christians that helped them to stabilize their own beliefs." According to Gilles Quispel, Catholicism arose in response to Gnosticism, establishing safeguards in the form of the monarchic episcopate, the creed, and the canon of holy books. On the other hand, Larry Hurtado argues that proto-orthodox Christianity was rooted in first-century Christianity:

...to a remarkable extent early-second-century protoorthodox devotion to Jesus represents a concern to preserve, respect, promote, and develop what were by then becoming traditional expressions of belief and reverence, and that had originated in earlier years of the Christian movement. That is, proto-orthodox faith tended to affirm and develop devotional and confessional tradition [...] Arland Hultgren has shown that the roots of this appreciation of traditions of faith actually go back deeply and widely into first-century Christianity.

=== Historical Jesus ===
The Gnostic movements may contain information about the historical Jesus, since some texts preserve sayings which show similarities with canonical sayings. The Gospel of Thomas in particular has a significant amount of parallel sayings. Yet, a striking difference is that the canonical sayings center on the coming endtime, while the Thomas-sayings center on a kingdom of heaven that is already here, and not a future event. Helmut Koester argues that the Thomas-sayings are older, implying that in the earliest forms of Christianity, Jesus was regarded as a wisdom-teacher, while April DeConick contends that the Thomasine tradition turned toward a "new theology of mysticism" and a "theological commitment to a fully-present kingdom of heaven here and now, where their church had attained Adam and Eve's divine status before the Fall" during the second century in response to eschatological concerns. According to scholar-priest John P. Meier, scholars predominantly conclude that the Gospel of Thomas depends on or parallels the Synoptics. Meier has repeatedly argued against the historicity of the Gospel of Thomas, stating that it cannot be a reliable source for the quest of the historical Jesus and also considers it a Gnostic text. He has also argued against the authenticity of the parables found exclusively in the Gospel of Thomas. According to James Dunn, the Gnostic emphasis on an inherent difference between flesh and spirit represented a significant departure from the teachings of the Historical Jesus and his earliest followers.

=== Johannine literature ===
The prologue of the Gospel of John describes the incarnated Logos, the light that came to earth, in the person of Jesus. The Apocryphon of John contains a scheme of three descendants from the heavenly realm, the third one being Jesus, just as in the Gospel of John. Dillon argues for a relationship between Gnostic ideas and the Johannine community, though other scholars increasingly reject such a community. According to Raymond Brown, the Gospel of John shows "the development of certain gnostic ideas, especially Christ as heavenly revealer, the emphasis on light versus darkness, and anti-Jewish animus." The Johannine material reveals debates about the redeemer myth. The Johannine letters show that there were different interpretations of the gospel story, and the Johannine images may have contributed to second-century Gnostic ideas about Jesus as a redeemer who descended from heaven. According to DeConick, the Gospel of John shows a "transitional system from early Christianity to gnostic beliefs in a God who transcends our world." According to DeConick, John may show a bifurcation of the idea of the Jewish God into Jesus' Father in Heaven and the Jews' father, "the Father of the Devil" (most translations say "of [your] father the Devil"), which may have developed into the Gnostic idea of the Monad and the Demiurge.

=== Paul and Gnosticism ===
Tertullian calls Paul "the apostle of the heretics", because Paul's writings were attractive to Gnostics, and interpreted in a Gnostic way, while Jewish Christians found him to stray from the Jewish roots of Christianity. In I Corinthians (1 Corinthians 8:10), Paul refers to some church members as "having knowledge" (Greek: τὸν ἔχοντα γνῶσιν, ton ekonta gnosin). James Dunn writes that in some cases, Paul affirmed views that were closer to Gnosticism than to proto-orthodox Christianity.

According to Clement of Alexandria, the disciples of Valentinus said that Valentinus was a student of a certain Theudas, who was a student of Paul, and Elaine Pagels notes that Paul's epistles were interpreted by Valentinus in a Gnostic way, and Paul could be considered a proto-gnostic and a proto-Catholic. Many Nag Hammadi texts, including, for example, the Prayer of Paul and the Coptic Apocalypse of Paul, consider Paul to be "the great apostle". The fact that he claimed to have received his gospel directly by revelation from God appealed to the Gnostics, who claimed gnosis from the risen Christ. The Naassenes, Cainites, and Valentinians referred to Paul's epistles. However, his revelation was different from the Gnostic revelations. Walter Schmithals argued that the saying “Jesus be cursed” in 1 Corinthians 12:3 came from Corinthian Christians who were Gnostics, expressing a sharp distinction between the earthly Jesus and the heavenly Christ, and he cited Origen's report in Contra Celsum that Ophites admitted no one unless he first cursed Jesus as a parallel. Birger Pearson examined the Origen passage in its context and concluded that the Gnostics did not in fact curse Jesus, since in the Ophite view identifying Jesus with the serpent honored him, and that Contra Celsum 6.28 cannot be used as a parallel for interpreting 1 Corinthians 12:1–3.

== Major movements ==
=== Judean–Israelite Gnosticism ===
Although Elkesaites and Mandaeans were found mainly in Mesopotamia in the first few centuries of the common era, their origins appear to be Judean–Israelite in the Jordan valley.

==== Elkesaites ====
The Elkesaites were a Judeo-Christian baptismal sect that originated in the Transjordan and were active between 100 and 400 AD. The members of this sect performed frequent baptisms for purification and had a Gnostic disposition. The sect is named after its leader Elkesai.

According to Joseph Lightfoot, the Church Father Epiphanius (writing in the 4th century AD) seems to make a distinction between two main groups within the Essenes: "Of those that came before his [Elxai (Elkesai), an Ossaean prophet] time and during it, the Ossaeans and the Nasaraeans."

==== Mandaeism ====
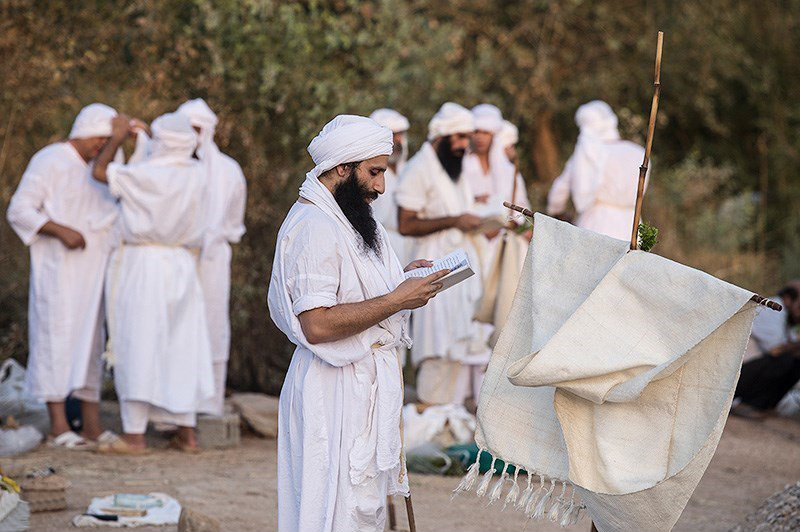
Mandaeans in prayer during baptism

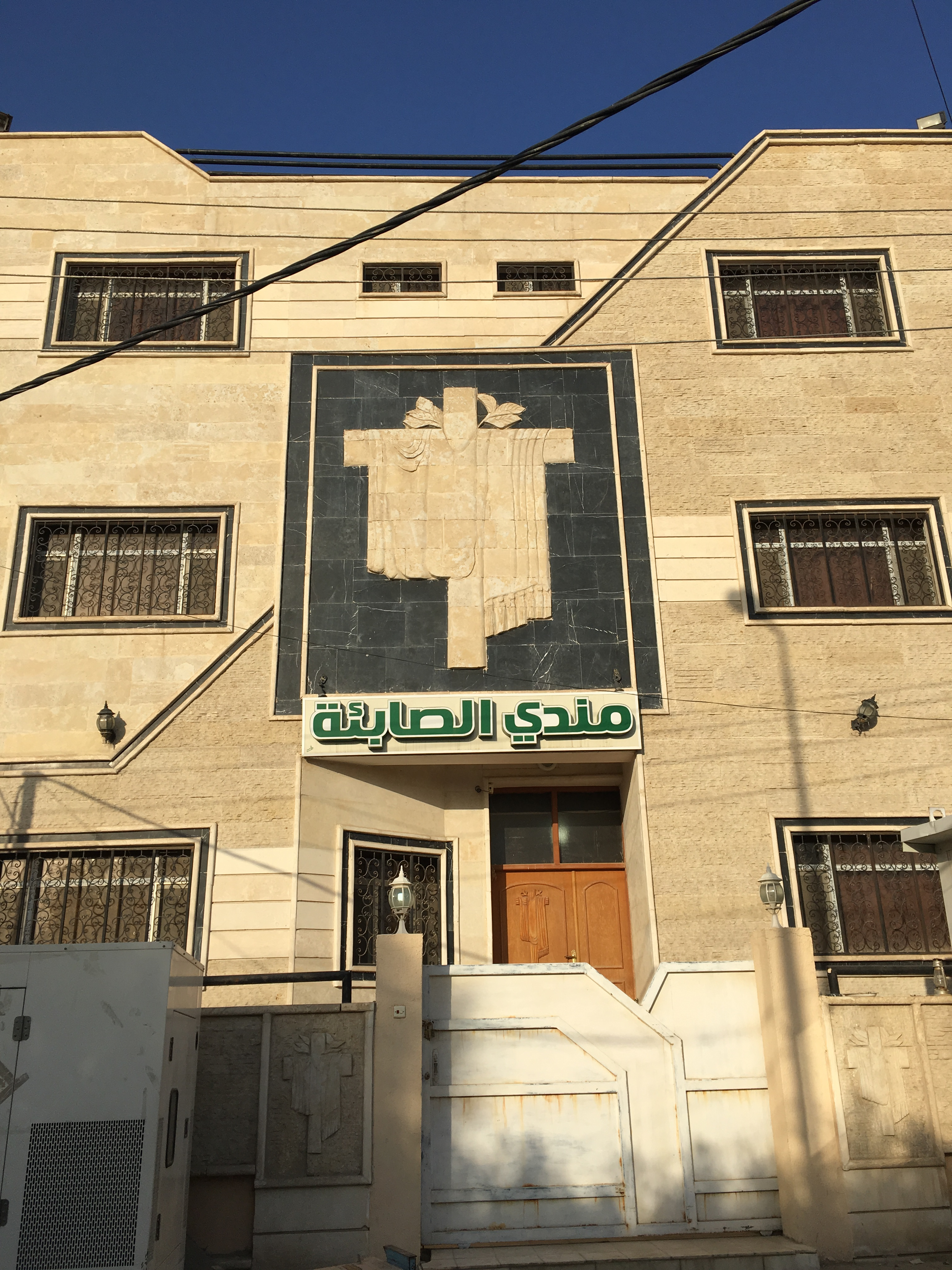
Mandaean Beth Manda (Mashkhanna) in Nasiriyah, southern Iraq, in 2016, a contemporary-style mandi

Mandaeism is a Gnostic, monotheistic and ethnic religion. The Mandaeans are an ethnoreligious group that speak a dialect of Eastern Aramaic known as Mandaic. They are the only surviving Gnostics from antiquity. Their religion has been practiced primarily around the lower Karun, Euphrates and Tigris and the rivers that surround the Shatt-al-Arab waterway, part of southern Iraq and Khuzestan province in Iran. Mandaeism is still practiced in small numbers, in parts of southern Iraq and the Iranian province of Khuzestan, and there are thought to be between 60,000 and 70,000 Mandaeans worldwide.

The name 'Mandaean' comes from the Aramaic manda meaning knowledge. John the Baptist is a key figure in the religion, as an emphasis on baptism is part of their core beliefs. According to Nathaniel Deutsch, "Mandaean anthropogony echoes both rabbinic and gnostic accounts." Mandaeans revere Adam, Abel, Seth, Enos, Noah, Shem, Aram, and especially John the Baptist. Significant amounts of original Mandaean Scripture, written in Mandaean Aramaic, survive in the modern era. The most important holy scripture is known as the Ginza Rabba and has portions identified by some scholars as being copied as early as the 2nd–3rd centuries, while others such as S. F. Dunlap place it in the 1st century. There is also the Qulasta (Mandaean prayerbook) and the Mandaean Book of John (Sidra ḏ'Yahia) and other scriptures.

Mandaeans believe that there is a constant battle or conflict between the forces of good and evil. The forces of good are represented by Nhura (Light) and Maia Hayyi (Living Water) and those of evil are represented by Hshuka (Darkness) and Maia Tahmi (dead or rancid water). The two waters are mixed in all things in order to achieve a balance. Mandaeans also believe in an afterlife or heaven called Alma d-Nhura (World of Light).

In Mandaeism, the World of Light is ruled by a Supreme God, known as Hayyi Rabbi ('The Great Life' or 'The Great Living God'). God is so great, vast, and incomprehensible that no words can fully depict how immense God is. It is believed that an innumerable number of Uthras (angels or guardians), manifested from the light, surround and perform acts of worship to praise and honor God. They inhabit worlds separate from the lightworld and some are commonly referred to as emanations and are subservient beings to the Supreme God who is also known as 'The First Life'. Their names include Second, Third, and Fourth Life (i.e. Yōšamin, Abathur, and Ptahil).

The Lord of Darkness (Krun) is the ruler of the World of Darkness formed from dark waters representing chaos. A main defender of the darkworld is a giant monster, or dragon, with the name Ur, and an evil, female ruler also inhabits the darkworld, known as Ruha. The Mandaeans believe these malevolent rulers created demonic offspring who consider themselves the owners of the seven planets and twelve zodiac constellations.

According to Mandaean beliefs, the material world is a mixture of light and dark created by Ptahil, who fills the role of the demiurge, with help from dark powers, such as Ruha the Seven, and the Twelve. Adam's body (believed to be the first human created by God in Abrahamic tradition) was fashioned by these dark beings, however his soul (or mind) was a direct creation from the Light. Therefore, Mandaeans believe the human soul is capable of salvation because it originates from the World of Light. The soul, sometimes referred to as the 'inner Adam' or Adam kasia, is in dire need of being rescued from the dark, so it may ascend into the heavenly realm of the World of Light.

Baptisms are a central theme in Mandaeism, believed to be necessary for the redemption of the soul. Mandaeans do not perform a single baptism, as in religions such as Christianity; rather, they view baptisms as a ritual act capable of bringing the soul closer to salvation. Therefore, Mandaeans are baptized repeatedly during their lives. Mandaeans consider John the Baptist to have been a Nasoraean Mandaean. John is referred to as their greatest and final teacher.

Jorunn J. Buckley and other scholars specializing in Mandaeism believe that the Mandaeans originated about two thousand years ago in the Judean region and moved east due to persecution. Others claim a southwestern Mesopotamian origin. However, some scholars take the view that Mandaeism is older and dates from pre-Christian times. Mandaeans assert that their religion predates Judaism, Christianity, and Islam as a monotheistic faith. Mandaeans believe that they descend directly from Shem, Noah's son, and also from John the Baptist's original disciples.

Due to paraphrases and word-for-word translations from the Mandaean originals found in the Psalms of Thomas, it is now believed that the pre-Manichaean presence of the Mandaean religion is more than likely. The Valentinians embraced a Mandaean baptismal formula in their rituals in the 2nd century AD. Birger A. Pearson compares the Five Seals of Sethianism, which he believes is a reference to quintuple ritual immersion in water, to Mandaean masbuta. According to Jorunn J. Buckley, "Sethian Gnostic literature ... is related, perhaps as a younger sibling, to Mandaean baptism ideology."

In addition to accepting Mandaeism's Israelite or Judean origins, Buckley adds:

[T]he Mandaeans may well have become the inventors of – or at least contributors to the development of – Gnosticism ... and they produced the most voluminous Gnostic literature we know, in one language... influenc[ing] the development of Gnostic and other religious groups in late antiquity [e.g. Manichaeism, Valentianism].

==== Samaritan Baptist sects ====
According to Magris, Samaritan Baptist sects trace back to John the Baptist. One offshoot was in turn headed by Dositheus, Simon Magus, and Menander. It was in this milieu that the idea emerged that the world was created by ignorant angels. Their baptismal ritual removed the consequences of sin, and led to a regeneration by which natural death, which was caused by these angels, was overcome. The Samaritan leaders were viewed as "the embodiment of God's power, spirit, or wisdom, and as the redeemer and revealer of 'true knowledge'".

The Simonians were centered on Simon Magus, the magician baptised by Philip and rebuked by Peter in Acts 8, who became in early Christianity the archetypal false teacher. The ascription by Justin Martyr, Irenaeus, and others of a connection between schools in their time and the individual in Acts 8 may be as legendary as the stories attached to him in various apocryphal books. Justin Martyr identifies Menander of Antioch as Simon Magus' pupil. According to Hippolytus, Simonianism is an earlier form of the Valentinian doctrine.

The Quqites were a group who followed a Samaritan, Iranian type of Gnosticism in 2nd-century AD Erbil and in the vicinity of what is today northern Iraq. The sect was named after their founder Quq, known as "the potter". The Quqite ideology arose in Edessa, Syria, in the 2nd century. The Quqites stressed the Hebrew Bible, made changes in the New Testament, associated twelve prophets with twelve apostles, and held that the latter corresponded to the same number of gospels. Their beliefs seem to have been eclectic, with elements of Judaism, Christianity, paganism, astrology, and Gnosticism.

=== Syriac–Egyptian Gnosticism ===
Syriac–Egyptian Gnosticism includes Sethianism, Valentinianism, Basilidians, Thomasine traditions, and Serpent Gnostics, and a number of other minor groups and writers. Hermeticism is also a western Gnostic tradition, though it differs in some respects from these other groups. The Syriac–Egyptian school derives much of its outlook from Platonist influences. It depicts creation in a series of emanations from a primal monadic source, finally resulting in the creation of the material universe. These schools tend to view evil in terms of matter that is markedly inferior to goodness and lacking spiritual insight and goodness rather than as an equal force.

Many of these movements used texts related to Christianity, with some identifying themselves as specifically Christian, though quite different from the Orthodox or Roman Catholic forms. Jesus and several of his apostles, such as Thomas the Apostle, claimed as the founder of the Thomasine form of Gnosticism, figure in many Gnostic texts. Mary Magdalene is respected as a Gnostic leader, and is considered superior to the twelve apostles by some Gnostic texts, such as the Gospel of Mary. John the Evangelist is claimed as a Gnostic by some Gnostic interpreters, as is even St. Paul. Most of the literature from this category is known to us through the Nag Hammadi Library.

==== Sethite-Barbeloite ====
Sethianism was one of the main currents of Gnosticism during the 2nd to 3rd centuries, and the prototype of Gnosticism as condemned by Irenaeus. Sethianism attributed its gnosis to Seth, third son of Adam and Eve and Norea, wife of Noah, who also plays a role in Mandaeism and Manicheanism. Their main text is the Apocryphon of John, containing two earlier myths. Earlier texts such as Apocalypse of Adam show signs of being pre-Christian and focus on Seth. Later Sethian texts continue to interact with Platonism. Sethian texts such as Zostrianos and Allogenes draw on the imagery of older Sethian texts, but use "a large fund of philosophical conceptuality derived from contemporary Platonism, (that is, late middle Platonism) with no traces of Christian content." (Note: The doctrine of the "triple-powered one" found in the text Allogenes, as discovered in the Nag Hammadi Library, is "the same doctrine as found in the anonymous Parmenides commentary (Fragment XIV) ascribed by Hadot to Porphyry [...] and is also found in Plotinus' Ennead 6.7, 17, 13–26.")

According to John D. Turner, German and American scholarship views Sethianism as "a distinctly inner-Jewish, albeit syncretistic and heterodox, phenomenon", while British and French scholarship tends to see Sethianism as "a form of heterodox Christian speculation". Roelof van den Broek notes that "Sethianism" may never have been a separate religious movement, and that the term refers rather to a set of mythological themes which occur in various texts.

According to Smith, Sethianism may have begun as a pre-Christian tradition, possibly a syncretic cult that incorporated elements of Christianity and Platonism as it grew. According to Temporini, Vogt, and Haase, early Sethians may be identical to or related to the Nazarenes, the Ophites, or the sectarian group called heretics by Philo.

According to Turner, Sethianism was influenced by Christianity and Middle Platonism, and originated in the second century as a fusion of a Jewish baptizing group of possibly priestly lineage, the so-called Barbeloites, named after Barbelo, the first emanation of the Highest God, and a group of Biblical exegetes, the Sethites, the "seed of Seth". At the end of the second century, Sethianism grew apart from the developing Christian orthodoxy, which rejected the Docetic view of the Sethians on Christ. In the early third century, Sethianism was fully rejected by Christian heresiologists, as Sethianism shifted toward the contemplative practices of Platonism while losing interest in their primal origins. In the late third century, Sethianism was attacked by neo-Platonists like Plotinus, and Sethianism became alienated from Platonism. In the early to mid-fourth century, Sethianism fragmented into various sectarian Gnostic groups such as the Archontics, Audians, Borborites, and Phibionites, and perhaps Stratiotici, and Secundians. Some of these groups existed into the Middle Ages.

==== Valentinianism ====
Valentinianism was named after its founder Valentinus (c. 100 – c. 180), who was a candidate for bishop of Rome but started his own group when another was chosen. Valentinianism flourished after mid-second century. The school was popular, spreading to Northwest Africa and Egypt, and through to Asia Minor and Syria in the east, and Valentinus is specifically named as gnostikos by Irenaeus. It was an intellectually vibrant tradition, with an elaborate and philosophically "dense" form of Gnosticism. Valentinus' students elaborated on his teachings and materials, and several varieties of their central myth are known.

Valentinian Gnosticism may have been monistic rather than dualistic. (Note: Quotes: * Elaine Pagels: "Valentinian gnosticism [...] differs essentially from dualism"; * Schoedel: "a standard element in the interpretation of Valentinianism and similar forms of Gnosticism is the recognition that they are fundamentally monistic".) In the Valentinian myths, the creation of a flawed materiality is not due to any moral failing on the part of the Demiurge, but due to the fact that he is less perfect than the superior entities from which he emanated. Valentinians treat physical reality with less contempt than other Gnostic groups, and conceive of materiality not as a separate substance from the divine, but as attributable to an error of perception which becomes symbolized mythopoetically as the act of material creation.

The followers of Valentinus attempted to systematically decode the Epistles, claiming that most Christians made the mistake of reading the Epistles literally rather than allegorically. Valentinians understood the conflict between Jews and Gentiles in Romans to be a coded reference to the differences between Psychics (people who are partly spiritual but have not yet achieved separation from carnality) and Pneumatics (totally spiritual people). The Valentinians argued that such codes were intrinsic in Gnosticism, secrecy being important to ensuring proper progression to true inner understanding. (Note: Irenaeus describes how the Valentinians claim to find evidence in Ephesians for their characteristic belief in the existence of the Æons as supernatural beings: "Paul also, they affirm, very clearly and frequently names these Æons, and even goes so far as to preserve their order, when he says, "To all the generations of the Æons of the Æon." (Ephesians 3:21) Nay, we ourselves, when at the giving of thanks we pronounce the words, 'To Æons of Æons' (for ever and ever), do set forth these Æons. And, in fine, wherever the words Æon or Æons occur, they at once refer them to these beings." On the Detection and Overthrow of Knowledge Falsely So Called Book 1. Ch.3)

According to Bentley Layton "Classical Gnosticism" and "The School of Thomas" antedated and influenced the development of Valentinus, whom Layton called "the great [Gnostic] reformer" and "the focal point" of Gnostic development. While in Alexandria, where he was born, Valentinus probably would have had contact with the Gnostic teacher Basilides, and may have been influenced by him. Simone Petrement, while arguing for a Christian origin of Gnosticism, places Valentinus after Basilides, but before the Sethians. According to Petrement, Valentinus represented a moderation of the anti-Judaism of the earlier Hellenized teachers; the demiurge, widely regarded as a mythological depiction of the Old Testament God of the Hebrews (i.e. Jehova), is depicted as more ignorant than evil.

==== Basilidians ====
The Basilidians or Basilideans were founded by Basilides of Alexandria in the second century. Basilides claimed to have been taught his doctrines by Glaucus, a disciple of St. Peter, but could also have been a pupil of Menander. Basilidianism survived until the end of the 4th century as Epiphanius knew of Basilidians living in the Nile Delta. It was, however, almost exclusively limited to Egypt, though according to Sulpicius Severus it seems to have found an entrance into Spain through a certain Mark from Memphis. St. Jerome states that the Priscillianists were infected with it.

==== Thomasine traditions ====
The Thomasine Traditions refers to a group of texts which are attributed to the apostle Thomas. (Note: The texts commonly attributed to the Thomasine Traditions are: The Hymn of the Pearl, or, the Hymn of Jude Thomas the Apostle in the Country of Indians; The Gospel of Thomas; The Infancy Gospel of Thomas; The Acts of Thomas; The Book of Thomas: The Contender Writing to the Perfect; The Psalms of Thomas; The Apocalypse of Thomas) Karen L. King notes that "Thomasine Gnosticism" as a separate category is being criticised, and may "not stand the test of scholarly scrutiny".

==== Marcion ====
Marcion was a Church leader from Sinope (a city on the south shore of the Black Sea in present-day Turkey), who preached in Rome around 150 AD, but was expelled and started his own congregation, which spread throughout the Mediterranean. He rejected the Old Testament, and followed a limited Christian canon, which included only a redacted version of Luke, and ten edited letters of Paul. Some scholars do not consider him to be a Gnostic, (Note: Encyclopædia Britannica: "In Marcion's own view, therefore, the founding of his church – to which he was first driven by opposition – amounts to a reformation of Christendom through a return to the gospel of Christ and to Paul; nothing was to be accepted beyond that. This of itself shows that it is a mistake to reckon Marcion among the Gnostics. A dualist he certainly was, but he was not a Gnostic".) but his teachings clearly resemble some Gnostic teachings. He preached a radical difference between the God of the Old Testament, the Demiurge, the "evil creator of the material universe", and the highest God, the "loving, spiritual God who is the father of Jesus", who had sent Jesus to the earth to free mankind from the tyranny of the Jewish Law. Like the Gnostics, Marcion argued that Jesus was essentially a divine spirit appearing to men in the shape of a human form, and not someone in a true physical body. Marcion held that the heavenly Father (the father of Jesus Christ) was an utterly alien god; he had no part in making the world, nor any connection with it.

==== Hermeticism ====
Hermeticism is closely related to Gnosticism, but its orientation is more positive.

==== Other Gnostic groups ====
- Serpent Gnostics. The Naassenes, Ophites and the Serpentarians gave prominence to snake symbolism, and snake handling played a role in their ceremonies.
- Cerinthus (c. 100), the founder of a school with gnostic elements. Like a Gnostic, Cerinthus depicted Christ as a heavenly spirit separate from the man Jesus, and he cited the demiurge as creating the material world. Unlike the Gnostics, Cerinthus taught Christians to observe the Jewish law; his demiurge was holy, not lowly; and he taught the Second Coming. His gnosis was a secret teaching attributed to an apostle. Some scholars believe that the First Epistle of John was written as a response to Cerinthus.
- The Cainites are so-named since Hippolytus of Rome claims that they worshiped Cain, and venerated Esau, Korah, the Sodomites, and Judas Iscariot. There is little evidence concerning the nature of this group. Hippolytus claims that they believed that indulgence in sin was the key to salvation because since the body is evil, one must defile it through immoral activity (see libertinism). The name Cainite is used as the name of a religious movement, and not in the usual Biblical sense of people descended from Cain.
- The Carpocratians, a libertine sect following only the Gospel according to the Hebrews.
- The school of Justin, which combined gnostic elements with the ancient Greek religion.
- The Borborites, a libertine Gnostic sect, said to be descended from the Nicolaitans

=== Persian Gnosticism ===
The Persian schools, which appeared in the western Persian Sasanian province of Asoristan, and whose writings were originally produced in the Eastern Aramaic dialects spoken in Mesopotamia at the time, are representative of what is believed to be among the oldest of the Gnostic thought forms. These movements are considered by most to be religions in their own right and are not emanations from Christianity or Judaism.

==== Manichaeism ====
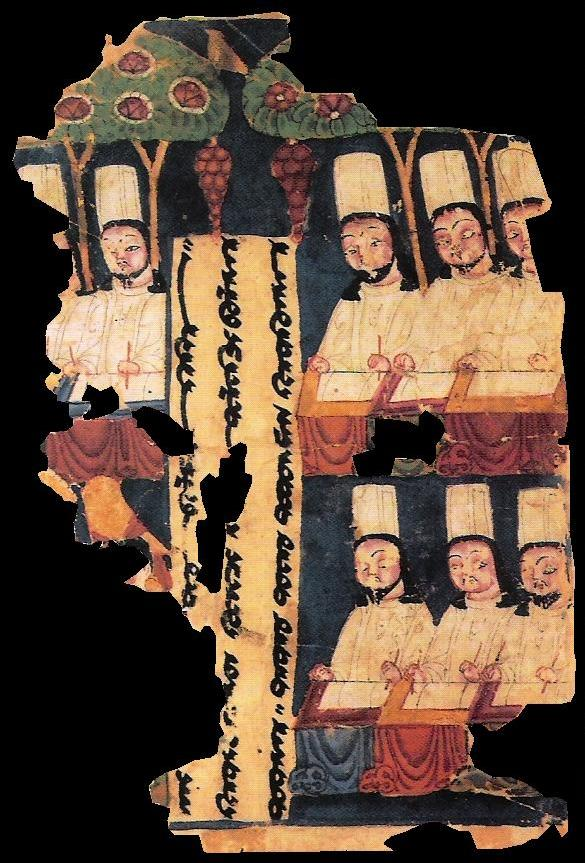
Manichean priests writing at their desks, with panel inscription in Sogdian. Manuscript from Qocho, Tarim Basin.

Manichaeism was founded by Mani (216–276). Mani's father was a member of the Jewish Christian sect of the Elcesaites, a subgroup of the Gnostic Ebionites. At ages 12 and 24, Mani had visionary experiences of a "heavenly twin" of his, calling him to leave his father's sect and preach the true message of Christ. In 240–241, Mani travelled to the Indo-Greek Kingdom of the Sakas in what is now Afghanistan, where he studied Hinduism and its various extant philosophies. Returning in 242, he joined the court of Shapur I, to whom he dedicated his only work written in Persian, known as the Shabuhragan. The original writings were written in Syriac, an Eastern Aramaic language, in a unique Manichaean script.

Manichaeism conceives of two coexistent realms of light and darkness that become embroiled in conflict. Certain elements of the light became entrapped within darkness, and the purpose of material creation is to engage in the slow process of extraction of these individual elements. In the end, the kingdom of light will prevail over darkness. Manicheanism inherits this dualistic mythology from Zurvanist Zoroastrianism, in which the eternal spirit Ahura Mazda is opposed by his antithesis, Angra Mainyu. This dualistic teaching embodied an elaborate cosmological myth that included the defeat of a primal man by the powers of darkness that devoured and imprisoned the particles of light.

According to Kurt Rudolph, the decline of Manichaeism that occurred in Persia in the 5th century was too late to prevent the spread of the movement into the east and the west. In the west, the teachings of the school moved into Syria, Northern Arabia, Egypt and North Africa. (Note: Where Augustine was a member of the school from 373–382.) There is evidence for Manicheans in Rome and Dalmatia in the 4th century, and also in Gaul and Spain. From Syria, it progressed further into Syria Palestina, Anatolia, and Byzantine and Persian Armenia.

The influence of Manicheanism was attacked by imperial edicts and polemical writings, but the religion remained prevalent until the 6th century, and still exerted influence in the emergence of Paulicianism, Bogomilism, and Catharism in the Middle Ages, until it was ultimately stamped out by the Catholic Church.

In the east, Rudolph relates, Manicheanism was able to bloom, because the religious monopoly position previously held by Christianity and Zoroastrianism had been broken by nascent Islam. In the early years of the Arab conquest, Manicheanism again found followers in Persia (mostly amongst educated circles), but flourished most in Central Asia, to which it had spread through Iran. There, in 762, Manicheanism became the state religion of the Uyghur Khaganate.

=== Middle Ages ===
After its decline in the Mediterranean world, Gnosticism lived on in the periphery of the Byzantine Empire, and resurfaced in the western world. The Paulicians, an Adoptionist group which flourished between 650 and 872 in Armenia and the Eastern Themes of the Byzantine Empire, were accused by orthodox medieval sources of being Gnostic and quasi-Manichaean. The Bogomils emerged in Bulgaria between 927 and 970 and spread throughout Europe. It was as synthesis of Armenian Paulicianism and the Bulgarian Orthodox Church reform movement.

The Cathars (Cathari, Albigenses or Albigensians) were also accused by their enemies of the traits of Gnosticism; though whether or not the Cathari possessed direct historical influence from ancient Gnosticism is disputed. If their critics are reliable, the basic conceptions of Gnostic cosmology are to be found in Cathar beliefs (most distinctly in their notion of a lesser, Satanic, creator god), though they did not apparently place any special relevance upon knowledge (gnosis) as an effective salvific force.

==== Islam ====
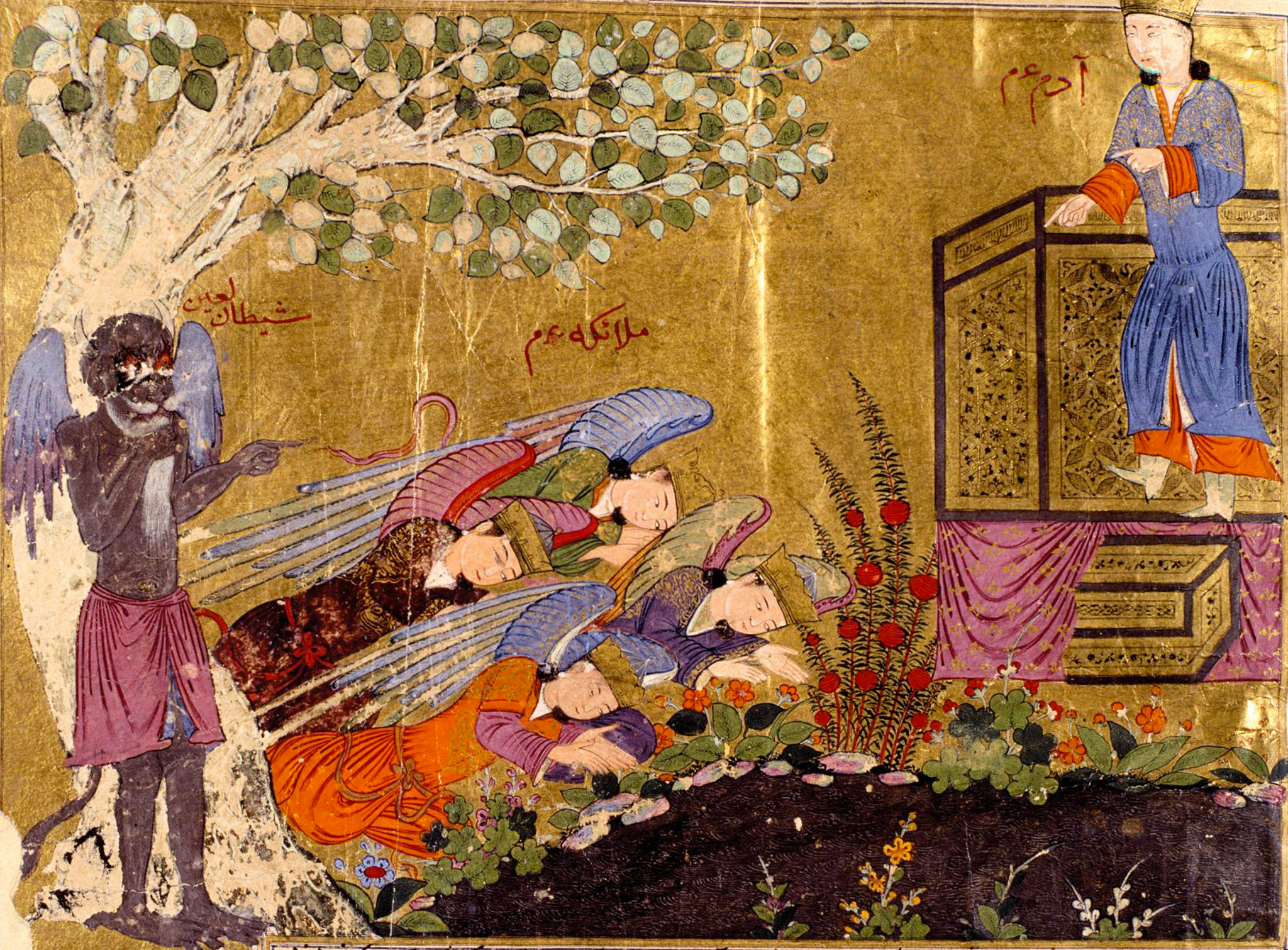
Some Sufistic interpretations depict Iblis as ruling the material desires in a manner that resembles the Gnostic Demiurge.

The Quran, like Gnostic cosmology, makes a sharp distinction between this world and the afterlife. God is commonly thought of as being beyond human comprehension. In some Islamic schools of thought, God is identifiable with the Monad.

However, according to Islam and unlike most Gnostic sects, it is not rejection of this world but the performing of good deeds that leads to Paradise. According to the Islamic belief in tawhid ("unification of God"), there was no room for a lower deity such as the demiurge.

Sufis, a sect of Islam, also integrated traces of an entity given authority over the lower world in some early writings: Iblis is regarded by some Sufis as the owner of this world and humans must avoid the treasures of this world since they would belong to him. Although in mainstream Islam, these beliefs do not exist.

In the Isma'ili Shi'i work Umm al-Kitab, Azazil's role resembles that of the demiurge. Like the demiurge, he is endowed with the ability to create a world and seeks to imprison humans in the material world, but here, his power is limited and depends on the higher God.

Further traces of Gnostic ideas can be found in Sufi anthropogeny. Like the Gnostic conception of human beings imprisoned in matter, Sufi traditions acknowledge that the human soul is an accomplice of the material world and subject to bodily desires similar to the way archontic spheres envelop the pneuma. The ruh (pneuma, spirit) must therefore gain victory over the lower and material-bound nafs (psyche, soul, or anima) to overcome its animal nature. A human being captured by its animal desires, mistakenly claims autonomy and independence from the "higher God", thus resembling the lower deity in classical Gnostic traditions. However, since the goal is not to abandon the created world, but just to free oneself from lower desires, it can be disputed whether this can still be Gnostic, but rather a completion of the message of Muhammad.

It seems that Gnostic ideas were an influential part of early Islamic development but later lost its influence. However light metaphors and the idea of unity of existence (Arabic: وحدة الوجود, romanized: waḥdat al-wujūd) still prevailed in later Islamic thought, such as that of ibn Sina.

==== Kabbalah ====
Gershom Scholem, a historian of Jewish philosophy, wrote that several core Gnostic ideas reappear in medieval Kabbalah, where they are used to reinterpret earlier Jewish sources. In these cases, according to Scholem, texts such as the Zohar adapted Gnostic precepts for the interpretation of the Torah, while not using the language of Gnosticism. Scholem further proposed that there was a Jewish Gnosticism which influenced the early origins of Christian Gnosticism.

Given that some of the earliest dated Kabbalistic texts emerged in medieval Provence, at which time Cathar movements were also supposed to have been active, Scholem and other mid-20th century scholars argued that there was mutual influence between the two groups. According to Dan Joseph, this hypothesis has not been substantiated by any extant texts.

Moshe Idel however has argued that the Gnostic or esoteric ideas found in Kabbalah have Jewish roots from ancient times, though we do not have written records of them.

=== Modern times ===
Found today in Iraq, Iran and diaspora communities, the Mandaeans are an ancient Gnostic ethnoreligious group that follow John the Baptist and have survived from antiquity. Their name comes from the Aramaic manda meaning knowledge or gnosis. There are thought to be 60,000 to 70,000 Mandaeans worldwide. A number of modern Gnostic ecclesiastical bodies have been set up or re-founded since the discovery of the Nag Hammadi library, including the Ecclesia Gnostica, Apostolic Johannite Church, Ecclesia Gnostica Catholica, the Gnostic Church of France, the Thomasine Church, the Alexandrian Gnostic Church, and the North American College of Gnostic Bishops. A number of 19th-century thinkers such as Arthur Schopenhauer, Albert Pike and Madame Blavatsky studied Gnostic thought extensively and were influenced by it, and even figures like Herman Melville and W. B. Yeats were tangentially influenced. Jules Doinel "re-established" a Gnostic church in France in 1890, which altered its form as it passed through various direct successors (Fabre des Essarts as Tau Synésius and Joanny Bricaud as Tau Jean II most notably), and, though small, is still active today.

Early 20th-century thinkers who heavily studied and were influenced by Gnosticism include Carl Jung (who supported Gnosticism), Eric Voegelin (who opposed it), Jorge Luis Borges (who included it in many of his short stories), and Aleister Crowley, with figures such as Hermann Hesse being more moderately influenced. René Guénon founded the Gnostic review, La Gnose in 1909, before moving to a more Perennialist position, and founding his Traditionalist School. Gnostic Thelemite organizations, such as Ecclesia Gnostica Catholica and Ordo Templi Orientis, trace themselves to Crowley's thought. The discovery and translation of the Nag Hammadi library after 1945 has had a huge effect on Gnosticism since World War II. Intellectuals who were heavily influenced by Gnosticism in this period include Lawrence Durrell, Hans Jonas, Philip K. Dick and Harold Bloom, with Albert Camus and Allen Ginsberg being more moderately influenced. Celia Green has written on Gnostic Christianity in relation to her own philosophy. Alfred North Whitehead was aware of the existence of the newly discovered Gnostic scrolls. Accordingly, Michel Weber has proposed a Gnostic interpretation of his late metaphysics.

== Sources ==
=== Heresiologists ===
Prior to the discovery of the Nag Hammadi library in 1945 Gnosticism was known primarily through the works of heresiologists, Church Fathers who opposed those movements. These writings had an antagonistic bias against Gnostic teachings, and were incomplete. Several heresiological writers, such as Hippolytus, made little effort to exactly record the nature of the sects they reported on, or transcribe their sacred texts. Reconstructions of incomplete Gnostic texts were attempted in modern times, but research on Gnosticism was coloured by the orthodox views of those heresiologists.

Justin Martyr (c. 100/114 – c. 162/168) wrote the First Apology, addressed to Roman emperor Antoninus Pius, which criticised Simon Magus, Menander and Marcion. Since then, both Simon and Menander have been considered as 'proto-Gnostic'. Irenaeus (died c. 202) wrote Against Heresies (c. 180–185), which identifies Simon Magus from Flavia Neapolis in Samaria as the inceptor of Gnosticism. Irenaeus charted an apparent spread of the teachings of Simon through the ancient "knowers" into the teachings of Valentinus and other contemporaneous Gnostic sects. (Note: This understanding of the transmission of Gnostic ideas, despite Irenaeus' certain antagonistic bias, is often utilized today, though it has been criticized.) Hippolytus (170–235) wrote the ten-volume Refutation Against all Heresies, of which eight have been found. It also focuses on the connection between pre-Socratic ideas and the false beliefs of early Gnostic leaders. Thirty-three of the groups he reported on are considered Gnostic by modern scholars, including 'the foreigners' and 'the Seth people'. Hippolytus further presents individual teachers such as Simon, Valentinus, Secundus, Ptolemy, Heracleon, Marcus and Colorbasus. Tertullian (c. 155 – c. 230) from Carthage wrote Adversus Valentinianos ('Against the Valentinians'), c. 206, and five books around 207–208 chronicling and refuting the teachings of Marcion.

=== Gnostic texts ===
Prior to the discovery at Nag Hammadi, a limited number of texts were available to students of Gnosticism. Reconstructions were attempted from the records of the heresiologists, but these were necessarily coloured by the motivation behind the source accounts. The Nag Hammadi library is a collection of mostly Gnostic texts discovered in 1945 near Nag Hammadi, Upper Egypt. Twelve leather-bound papyrus codices buried in a sealed jar were found by a local farmer named Muhammed al-Samman. The writings in these codices comprised fifty-two mostly Gnostic treatises, but they also include three works belonging to the Corpus Hermeticum and a partial translation/alteration of Plato's Republic. These codices may have belonged to a nearby Pachomian monastery, and buried after Bishop Athanasius condemned the use of non-canonical books in his Festal Letter of 367. Though the original language of composition was probably Greek, the various codices contained in the collection were written in Coptic. A 1st- or 2nd-century date of composition for the lost Greek originals has been proposed, though this is disputed; the manuscripts themselves date from the 3rd and 4th centuries. The Nag Hammadi texts demonstrated the fluidity of early Christian scripture and early Christianity itself. (Note: According to Layton, "the lack of uniformity in ancient Christian scripture in the early period is very striking, and it points to the substantial diversity within the Christian religion.")

== Academic studies ==
=== Development ===
Prior to the discovery of Nag Hammadi, the Gnostic movements were largely perceived through the lens of the early church heresiologists. Johann Lorenz von Mosheim (1694–1755) proposed that Gnosticism developed on its own in Greece and Mesopotamia, spreading to the west and incorporating Jewish elements. According to Mosheim, Jewish thought took Gnostic elements and used them against Greek philosophy. J. Horn and Ernest Anton Lewald proposed Persian and Zoroastrian origins, while Jacques Matter described Gnosticism as an intrusion of eastern cosmological and theosophical speculation into Christianity.

In the 1880s, Gnosticism was placed within Greek philosophy, especially neo-Platonism. Adolf von Harnack (1851–1930), who belonged to the History of Dogma school and proposed a Kirchengeschichtliches Ursprungsmodell, saw Gnosticism as an internal development within the church under the influence of Greek philosophy. According to von Harnack, Gnosticism was the "acute Hellenization of Christianity".

Fellow of Trinity College and gemstone collector William Charles King penned The Gnostics and Their Remains which compares Gnostic engravings with the art of classical Greece, highlighting the deliberate roughness of Gnostic art. King describing the value was not in the execution but the internal beauty following principles of Gnosticism.

The Religionsgeschichtliche Schule ("history of religions school", 19th century) had a profound influence on the study of Gnosticism. The Religionsgeschichtliche Schule saw Gnosticism as a pre-Christian phenomenon, and Christian gnosis as only one, and even marginal instance of this phenomenon. According to Wilhelm Bousset (1865–1920), Gnosticism was a form of Iranian and Mesopotamian syncretism, and Eduard Norden (1868–1941) also proposed pre-Christian origins, while Richard August Reitzenstein (1861–1931), and Rudolf Bultmann (1884–1976) also situated the origins of Gnosticism in Persia. Hans Heinrich Schaeder (1896–1957) and Hans Leisegang (1890–1951) saw Gnosticism as an amalgam of eastern thought in a Greek form.

Hans Jonas (1903–1993) took an intermediate approach, using both the comparative approach of the Religionsgeschichtliche Schule and the existentialist hermeneutics of Rudolph Bultmann. Jonas emphasized the duality between the Gnostic God and the world. Jonas concluded that Gnosticism cannot be derived from Platonism, nor from Judaism. Instead, he proposed that Gnosticism manifested an existential situation triggered by the conquests of Alexander the Great. Following Weber and Spengler, he noted the impact of the conquests on Greek city-states (in the "West") and castes of priest-intellectuals (in the Persian "East"). Following Jonas's existential lead and some of his methods, scholarship contemporary to Jonas advocated a different proposal, claiming that Gnosticism has Jewish or Judeo-Christian origins; These theses were notably put forward by Gershom Scholem (1897–1982) and Gilles Quispel (1916–2006).

The study of Gnosticism and of early Alexandrian Christianity received a strong impetus from the discovery of the Coptic Nag Hammadi library in 1945. A great number of translations have been published, and the works of Elaine Pagels, especially The Gnostic Gospels, which detailed the suppression of some of the writings found at Nag Hammadi by early bishops of the Christian church, have popularized Gnosticism in mainstream culture, but also provoked strong responses and condemnations from clerical writers. As of the 1970s, these and other publications applied the revised version of Jonas's proposal and criticized it, mostly relating to the evidence regarding "Pre-Cristian" Gnosticism.

A prominent shift of emphasis surfaced during the mid-1990s and the early years of the 21st century. In 1996, Michael Williams published his landmark Rethinking "Gnosticism" where he doubted the applicability of "Gnosticism" as a socio-historical category. Instead, and somewhat to the converse, he proposed the use of "Biblical-Demiurgic tradition", where "tradition" is read as a collective religious choice that competes on the religious "marketplace". In 2004, Karen Leigh King published her equally important What is Gnosticism?. Broadly, King's book traces elements of the history of research, arguing that the term and its typical connotations do injustice to the diversity and breadth of early Christianity. Thus, in King's reading, it is not precisely the category of Gnosticism that is flawed, but the way in which it was conceived and applied, a form of self/other rhetoric that rendered the remaining portion of Christianity less diverse for centuries to come.

The effects of Williams and King cannot be understated, to the point that "Gnostic studies" often became "Nag Hammadi studies". Nevertheless, some scholars seem to retain either a nuanced version of the term, considered "the Gnostic school of thought", or as a unique phenomenon regardless of defamation campaigns.

=== Definitions of Gnosticism ===
According to Matthew J. Dillon, six trends can be discerned in the definitions of Gnosticism:

- Typologies, "a catalogue of shared characteristics that are used to classify a group of objects together."
- Traditional approaches, viewing Gnosticism as a Christian heresy
- Phenomenological approaches, most notably Hans Jonas
- Restricting Gnosticism, "identifying which groups were explicitly called gnostics", or which groups were clearly sectarian
- Deconstructing Gnosticism, abandoning the category of "Gnosticism"
- Psychology and cognitive science of religion, approaching Gnosticism as a psychological phenomenon

==== Typologies ====
The 1966 Messina conference on the origins of gnosis and Gnosticism proposed to designate

... a particular group of systems of the second century after Christ" as gnosticism, and to use gnosis to define a conception of knowledge that transcends the times, which was described as "knowledge of divine mysteries for an élite.

This definition has now been abandoned. It created a religion, "Gnosticism", from the "gnosis" which was a widespread element of ancient religions, (Note: Markschies: "something was being called "gnosticism" that the ancient theologians had called 'gnosis' ... [A] concept of gnosis had been created by Messina that was almost unusable in a historical sense.") suggesting a homogeneous conception of gnosis by these Gnostic religions, which did not exist at the time.

According to Dillon, the texts from Nag Hammadi made clear that this definition was limited, and that they are "better classified by movements (such as Valentinian), mythological similarity (Sethian), or similar tropes (presence of a Demiurge)." Dillon further notes that the Messina-definition "also excluded pre-Christian Gnosticism and later developments, such as the Mandaeans and the Manichaeans."

Hans Jonas discerned two main currents of Gnosticism, namely Syrian-Egyptian, and Persian, which includes Manicheanism and Mandaeism. Among the Syrian-Egyptian schools and the movements they spawned are a typically more Monist view. Persian Gnosticism possesses more dualist tendencies, reflecting a strong influence from the beliefs of the Persian Zurvanist Zoroastrians. Those of the medieval Cathars, Bogomils, and Carpocratians seem to include elements of both categories. However, scholars such as Kurt Rudolph, Mark Lidzbarski, Rudolf Macúch, Ethel S. Drower and Jorunn Jacobsen Buckley argue for a Palestinian origin for Mandaeism.

Gilles Quispel divided Syrian-Egyptian Gnosticism further into Jewish Gnosticism (the Apocryphon of John) and Christian Gnosis (Marcion, Basilides, Valentinus). This "Christian Gnosticism" was Christocentric, and influenced by Christian writings such as the Gospel of John and the Pauline epistles. Other authors speak rather of "Gnostic Christians", noting that Gnostics were a prominent substream in the early church.

==== Traditional approaches – Gnosticism as Christian heresy ====
The best known example of this approach is Adolf von Harnack (1851–1930), who stated that "Gnosticism is the acute Hellenization of Christianity." According to Dillon, "many scholars today continue in the vein of Harnack in reading gnosticism as a late and contaminated version of Christianity", notably Darrell Block, who criticises Elaine Pagels for her view that early Christianity was wildly diverse.

==== Phenomenological approaches ====
Hans Jonas (1903–1993) took an existential phenomenological approach to Gnosticism. According to Jonas, alienation is a distinguishing characteristic of Gnosticism, making it different from contemporary religions. Jonas compares this alienation with the existentialist notion of geworfenheit, Martin Heidegger's "thrownness", as in being thrown into a hostile world.

==== Restricting Gnosticism ====
In the late 1980s scholars voiced concerns about the broadness of "Gnosticism" as a meaningful category. Bentley Layton proposed to categorize Gnosticism by delineating which groups were marked as Gnostic in ancient texts. According to Layton, this term was mainly applied by heresiologists to the myth described in the Apocryphon of John, and was used mainly by the Sethians and the Ophites. According to Layton, texts which refer to this myth can be called "classical Gnostic".

In addition, Alastair Logan uses social theory to identify Gnosticism. He uses Rodney Stark and William Bainbridge's sociological theory on traditional religion, sects and cults. According to Logan, the Gnostics were a cult, at odds with the society at large.

=== Criticism of "Gnosticism" as a category ===
According to the Westar Institute's Fall 2014 Christianity Seminar Report on Gnosticism, there is no group that possesses all of the usually-attributed features. Nearly every group possesses one or more of them, or some modified version of them. There was no particular relationship among any set of groups which one could distinguish as "Gnostic", as if they were in opposition to some other set of groups. For instance, every sect of Christianity on which we have any information on this point believed in a separate Logos who created the universe at God's behest. Likewise, they believed some kind of secret knowledge ("gnosis") was essential to ensuring one's salvation. Likewise, they had a dualist view of the cosmos, in which the lower world was corrupted by meddling divine beings and the upper world's God was awaiting a chance to destroy it and start over, thereby helping humanity to escape its corrupt bodies and locations by fleeing into celestial ones.

According to Michael Allen Williams, the concept of Gnosticism as a distinct religious tradition is questionable, since "gnosis" was a pervasive characteristic of many religious traditions in antiquity, and not restricted to the so-called Gnostic systems. According to Williams, the conceptual foundations on which the category of Gnosticism rests are the remains of the agenda of the heresiologists. The early church heresiologists created an interpretive definition of Gnosticism, and modern scholarship followed this example and created a categorical definition. According to Williams the term needs replacing to more accurately reflect those movements it comprises, and suggests to replace it with the term "the Biblical demiurgical tradition".

According to Karen King, scholars have "unwittingly continued the project of ancient heresiologists", searching for non-Christian influences, thereby continuing to portray a pure, original Christianity.

In light of such increasing scholarly rejection and restriction of the concept of Gnosticism, David G. Robertson has written on the distortions which misapplications of the term continue to perpetuate in religious studies.

== Psychological approaches ==
Carl Jung approached Gnosticism from a psychological perspective, which was followed by Gilles Quispel. According to this approach, Gnosticism is a map for the human development in which an undivided person, centered on the Self, develops out of the fragmentary personhood of young age. According to Quispel, gnosis is a third force in western culture, alongside faith and reason, which offers an experiential awareness of this Self. In Jung's interpretation, the Demiurge was a psychological symbol for the ego, which has forgotten its origins in the greater Self. This psychological archetype bears a functional resemblance to the modern concept of the inner critic.

According to Ioan Culianu, gnosis is made possible through universal operations of the mind, which can be arrived at "anytime, anywhere". A similar suggestion has been made by Edward Conze, who suggested that the similarities between prajñā and sophia may be due to "the actual modalities of the human mind", which in certain conditions result in similar experiences.

== See also ==
- Yaldabaoth
