= Rethinking "Gnosticism" =

1996 book by Michael Allen Williams

Rethinking "Gnosticism": An Argument for Dismantling a Dubious Category, is a 1996 book by Michael Allen Williams.

This is one of the first critical works that goes about comparing the established academic definitions of gnosticism to the texts discovered at Nag Hammadi. The main points of the book are that there is no established definition of "gnosticism" by people who use the term, let alone the academic world; and that the groups referred to as "gnostic" by the Christian Church apologists referred to themselves often by their leader or leaders' names, but no group referred to themselves as "gnostic" or "gnostics".

Also, Williams mentions the argument that none of the groups labeled "gnostic" shared a common set of beliefs that put them in a group together. The only things close to this would be the Christian heresiographical use of referring to these varied groups as "gnostics". As well as the varied set of interruptions of the creator of the material world (Yahweh or demiurge) by these early groups. Finally Williams clarifies that the ancient "gnosticism" of the Nag Hammadi groups and the misused "gnosticism" of modern groups and academia have little if anything in common. Williams suggests a better and more adequate term for these heretical groups would be "biblical demiurgical traditions".
