= Against Heresies =

Work of Christian theology written in Greek by Irenaeus

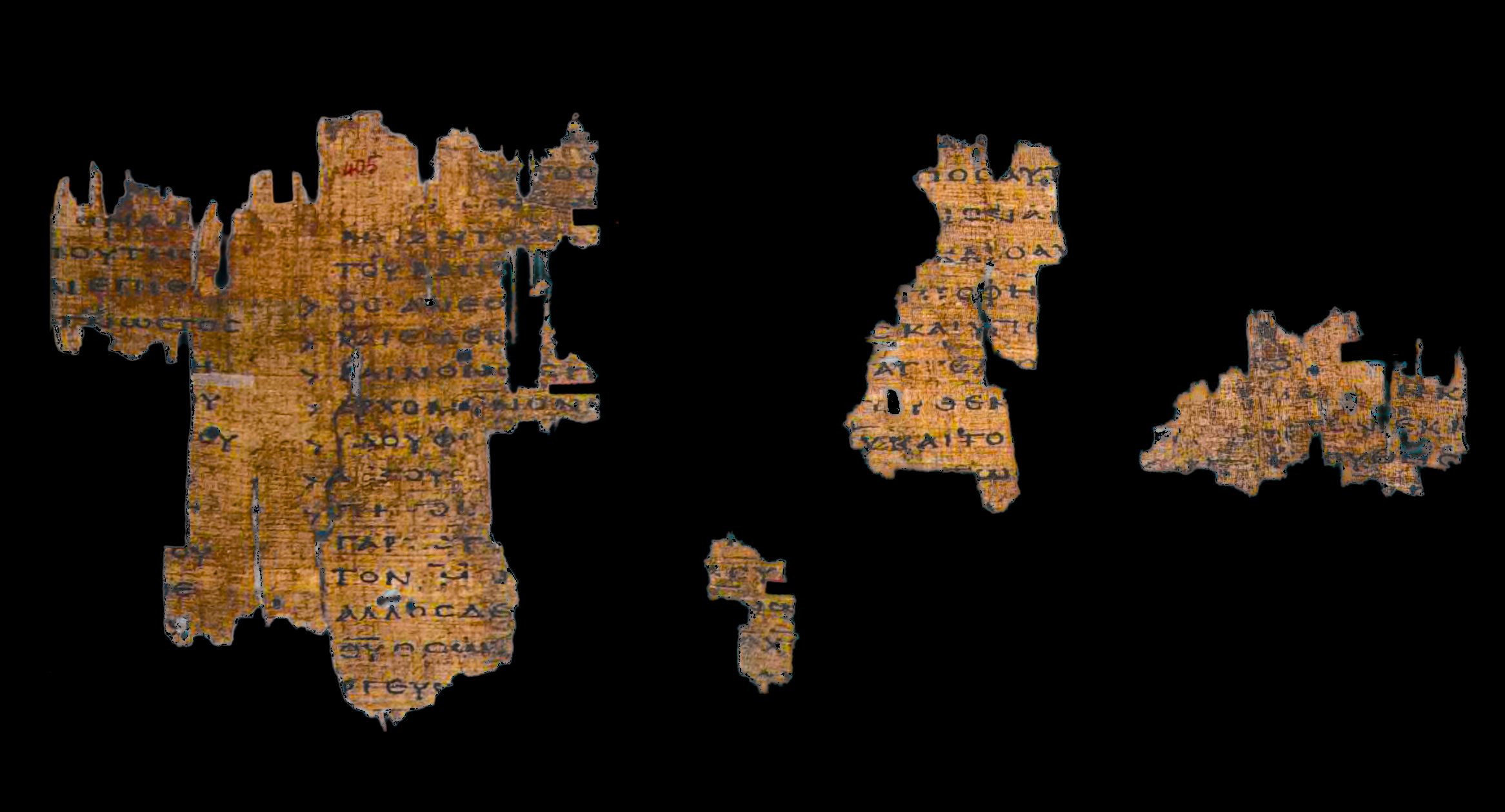
P. Oxyrhynchus 405 – fragment of Against Heresies from c. 200 AD

Against Heresies is a work of Christian theology written in Greek by Irenaeus, the bishop of Lugdunum (now Lyon in France). Due to its reference to Eleutherus as the current bishop of Rome, the work is usually dated c. 180. In it, Irenaeus identifies and describes several schools of Gnosticism, and other schools of Christian thought, whose beliefs he rejects as heresy. He contrasts them with orthodox Christianity (proto-orthodox Christianity).

Only fragments of the original text in ancient Greek remain today, but a complete (less one paragraph) Latin translation – "very ancient", "probably made in the fourth or early fifth century" – still survives. Books IV and V exist in their entirety in a literal version in Armenian. There are quotations in Syriac, but it is not clear if a translation of the whole was ever made into Syriac.

Against Heresies (Latin: Adversus haereses, Greek: Κατὰ αἱρέσεων), also given as Against the Heresies, is the conventional name for the work. That name for it comes from Eusebius, whose Ecclesiastical History contains many quotations from Against Heresies. The original title of the work, in Koine Greek, was Ἔλεγχος καὶ ἀνατροπὴ τῆς ψευδωνύμου γνώσεως (Elenchos kai anatropē tēs pseudōnymou gnōseōs). And so in English the work is sometimes referred to by translations of the full Greek title, such as Refutation and Overthrow of the Knowledge Falsely So-called, The Detection and Overthrow of Knowledge Falsely So-Called, Detection and Overthrow of Knowledge Falsely So-Called, The Refutation and Overthrowal of Knowledge falsely so-called, and Refutation and Overthrowal of Knowledge falsely so-called.

The final phrase "of knowledge falsely so-called" (Ancient Greek: tes pseudonymou gnoseos genitive case; or nominative case pseudonymos gnosis – ψευδώνυμος pseudonymos meaning "under a false name, falsely called") is found in 1 Timothy 6:20

Timothy, guard the deposit entrusted to you. Avoid the profane chatter and contradictions of what is falsely called knowledge; ...

== Historical importance ==
Until the discovery of the Library of Nag Hammadi in 1945, Against Heresies was the best surviving contemporary description of Gnosticism. Today, the treatise remains historically important as one of the first unambiguous attestations of the canonical gospel texts and some of the Pauline epistles. Irenaeus cites from most of the New Testament canon, as well as the noncanonical works 1 Clement and The Shepherd of Hermas; however, he makes no references to Philemon, 2 Peter, 3 John or Jude – four of the shortest epistles.

== Purpose ==
Against Heresies can be dated to sometime between 174 and 189 AD, as the list of the Bishops of Rome includes Eleutherius, but not his successor Victor. The earliest manuscript fragment of Against Heresies, P. Oxy. 405, dates to around 200 AD.

Irenaeus' primary goal in writing Against Heresies was to attack sects that deviated from Christianity, mainly the Gnostics and Marcionites. In particular, he sought to disprove what he saw as incorrect interpretations of scripture on the part of Gnostics such as Valentinus. Irenaeus sought to present "what was understood as an authentic form of century-old Christian tradition against various forms of Gnosticism". As James VanderKam notes, elements of this early Christian tradition drawn upon by Irenaeus include apocalyptic traditions such as 1 Enoch.

As bishop, Irenaeus felt compelled to keep a close eye on the Valentinians and to safeguard the church from them. In order to fulfill this duty, Irenaeus became well informed of Gnostic doctrines and traditions. His studies of Gnosticism eventually led to the compilation of this treatise.

== Main ideas ==
Irenaeus argued that orthodox Christianity was passed down to him from the apostles who knew Jesus personally, while the Gnostics and Marcionites were distorting this apostolic tradition.

While the Gnostics offered salvation through secret knowledge available only to a few, Irenaeus contended that the true doctrines of the Christian faith are identical even when taught by bishops in different areas.

While many of the Gnostics viewed the material world as flawed and from which believers sought to escape to an eternal realm of spirit, Irenaeus saw creation as good and ultimately destined for glorification. As Mark Jeffrey Olson points out, 1 Corinthians 15:50 is quoted more than any other verse from the letters of Paul in Against Heresies:

I tell you this, brethren: flesh and blood cannot inherit the kingdom of God, nor does the perishable inherit the imperishable.

— 1 Corinthians 15:50, RSV

Both Irenaeus and the Valentinians use this verse to argue for their own understandings of the resurrection of the dead. The Valentinians believed that resurrection was a purely spiritual phenomenon, while Irenaeus insisted that Christians would be raised from the dead in fleshly bodies. According to Irenaeus, this verse was used by the Gnostics to argue that "the handiwork of God is not saved".

Irenaeus also polemicized against Marcion of Sinope, who preached that the creator God of the Hebrew Bible and the Father of Jesus Christ were two different Gods. Irenaeus argues that the same God who sent Jesus to the Earth also led man through history by way of the Jewish law and prophets.

== Contents ==
- Book 1: I. Valentinus, II. the Propator, III. the misuse of the Bible, IV. the mother Achamoth, V. the Demiurge, VI. The threefold man, VII. against the incarnation, VIII. the Valentinians misuse of the Bible, IX. refutation by Irenaeus, X. the unity of the church, XI. Valentinus' disciples and others. XII. Ptolemy and Colorbasus. XIII. Marcus. XIV. letters and syllables. XV. Sige on the twenty-four elements. XVI. the Marcosians. XVII. Marcosians. XVIII. Misuse of passages from Genesis. XIX. misuse of Bible XX. apocryphal scriptures, XXI. the heretics on redemption, XXII. deviations from the truth. XXIII. Simon Magus and Menander. XXIV. Saturninus and Basilides. XXV. Carpocrates. XXVI. Cerinthus, the Ebionites, and Nicolaitans. XXVII. Cerdo and Marcion. XXVIII. Tatian, the Encratites. XXIX. Borborians. XXX. Ophites and Sethians. XXXI. Cainites and conclusion of Book I.
- Book 2: A rebuttal of the Gnostic systems employing philosophical arguments primarily rather than employing Scripture.
- Book 3: Rebuttal based on apostolic succession and tradition passed down of the faith; defense of the incarnation of Jesus; defense of the virgin birth.
- Book 4: Demonstration that the God of the Old Testament is the God of the New Testament.
- Book 5: A defense of the physical resurrection and eternal judgement.

== See also ==
- P. Oxy. 405
