= Gospel of Philip =

Christian non-canonical gospel

The Gospel of Philip is a non-canonical Gnostic Gospel dated to around the 3rd century but lost in medieval times until rediscovered by accident, buried with other texts near Nag Hammadi in Egypt, in 1945.

The Gospel is not accepted as canonical by the Christian church. Although it may have some relationship to the beliefs expressed in the Gospel of Thomas, scholars are divided as to whether it should be read as a single discourse or as a collection of otherwise unrelated Valentinian sayings. Sacraments, in particular the sacrament of marriage, are a major theme. As in other texts often associated with what has been referred to as "Gnosticism," such as the Gospel of Thomas and Gospel of Mary, the Gospel of Philip defends a tradition that gives Mary Magdalene a special relationship and insight into Jesus's teaching. The text contains fifteen sayings of Jesus. Seven of these sayings are also found in the canonical gospels, and two are closely related to sayings in the Gospel of Thomas.

== Date of composition ==
The gospel's title appears at the end of the Coptic manuscript in a colophon. The text proper makes no claim to be from Philip; the only connection with Philip the Apostle within the text is that he is the only apostle mentioned (at 73,8). Most scholars hold a 3rd-century date of composition.

== History and context ==
A single manuscript of the Gospel of Philip, in Coptic (CG II), was found in the Nag Hammadi library, a cache of documents that was hidden in a jar and buried in the Egyptian desert at the end of the 4th century. The text was bound in the same codex that contained the better-known Gospel of Thomas.

From the mix of aphorisms, parables, brief polemics, narrative dialogue, biblical exegesis (especially of Genesis), and dogmatic propositions, Wesley W. Isenberg, the editor and translator of the text, has attributed seventeen sayings (logia) to Jesus, nine of which he characterizes (Isenberg 1996, pp. 139ff) as citations and interpretations of those found in the canonical gospels. (Note: Those in the canonical New Testament: 55,33–34; 57,3–5; 68,8–12; 68,26–27; 72,33–73,1; 77,18; 83,11–13; 84,7–9; 85,29–31.) The new sayings, (Note: The new sayings: 55,37–56,3; 58,10–14; 59,25–27; 63,29–30; 64,2–9; 64,10–12; 67,30–35; and 74,25–27.) "identified by the formula introducing them ('he said', 'the Lord said', or 'the Saviour said') are brief and enigmatic and are best interpreted from a Gnostic perspective.

Much of the Gospel of Philip is concerned with Gnostic views of the origin and nature of mankind and the sacraments it refers to as baptism, unction and marriage. It is not always clear whether these are the same literal rituals known in other parts of the early Christian movement and since, or ideal and heavenly realities. The Gospel emphasizes the sacramental nature of the embrace between man and woman (or ideas represented by these as types) in the "nuptial chamber," which is an archetype of spiritual unity. (Note: The Old and New Testament and Gnostic contexts and the text are discussed by Grant 1961, pp. 129–140) Many of the sayings are identifiably related to other texts referred to by scholars as Gnostic, and often appear quite mysterious and enigmatic (these are from the translation by Isenberg 1996, pp. 139-):

The Lord said, "Blessed is he who is before he came into being. For he who is, has been and shall be."

He who has knowledge of the truth is a free man, but the free man does not sin, for "He who sins is the slave of sin" (John 8:34). Truth is the mother, knowledge the father.

Echamoth is one thing and Echmoth, another. Echamoth is Wisdom simply, but Echmoth is the Wisdom of death, which is the one who knows death, which is called "the little Wisdom".

Early in the text it says: "Those who say they will die first and then rise are in error. If they do not first receive the resurrection while they live, when they die they will receive nothing." Later in the text it says: "Those who say that the Lord died first and then rose up are in error – for He rose up first and then died."

Jesus came to crucify the world.

Jesus took them all by stealth, for he did not appear as he was, but in the manner in which they would be able to see him. He appeared to them all. He appeared to the great as great. He appeared to the small as small. He appeared to the angels as an angel, and to men as a man.

It is not possible for anyone to see anything of the things that actually exist unless he becomes like them... You saw the Spirit, you became spirit. You saw Christ, you became Christ. You saw the Father, you shall become Father. So in this place you see everything and do not see yourself, but in that place you do see yourself - and what you see you shall become.

Adam came into being from two virgins, from the Spirit and from the virgin earth. Christ therefore, was born from a virgin to rectify the Fall which occurred in the beginning.

One saying in particular appears to identify the levels of initiation in Gnosticism, although what exactly the bridal chamber represented in gnostic thought is a matter of debate:

The Lord did everything in a mystery, a baptism and a chrism and a eucharist and a redemption and a bridal chamber.

One possibility is that the bridal chamber refers symbolically to the relationship of trust and singular devotion that should exist between God (bridegroom) and humankind or believer (bride) – just as the marriage relationship (bedchamber) implies a devotion of husband and wife to each other that is expected to exclude all other parties. This symbolic meaning is found for example in the Parable of the Ten Virgins – (Matthew 25:1–13), "Then shall the kingdom of heaven be likened unto ten virgins, which took their lamps, and went forth to meet the bridegroom".

Another interpretation of the Gospel of Philip supported by scholar Marvin W. Meyer, emphasizes Jesus as central focus of the text. Some quotations from the gospel could be inferred as placing Jesus in a central position:

Those who produce the name of the Father and the Son and the Holy Spirit...[are] no longer a Christian but [are] Christ. (Philip logion 72)

"My God, my God, why, O Lord, have you forsaken me?" (Mark 15:34). It was on the cross that he said these words, for he had departed from that place. (Philip logion 77)

We are born again through the Holy Spirit, and we are conceived through Christ in baptism with two elements. We are anointed through the spirit, and when we are conceived, we were united. (Philip logion 80)

Jesus appeared [...] Jordan - the fullness of the Kingdom of Heaven. (Philip logion 88)

By perfecting the water of baptism, Jesus emptied it of death. Thus we do go down into the water, but we do not go down into death, in order that we may not be poured out into the spirit of the world. Philip logion 115)

According to Meyer, without Jesus, the rituals and mysteries mentioned in this gospel would have no context.

Furthermore, this text seems to be related to others connected with the Valentinian Christian sect, who worshipped a Christ interpreted through "Gnostic" ideas, and is often linked to what is sometimes thought to be Valentinius's own composition, the Gospel of Truth. If it was indeed composed in or near Antioch -- as is sometimes suggested by scholars -- it may be that this text was associated with Axionicus of Antioch and his community.

The Gospel of Philip ends with its promise:

If anyone becomes a 'son of the bridechamber' he will receive the Light. If anyone does not receive it while he is in these places, he cannot receive it in the other place. (Note: Luke 16:26 is indicated) He who receives any Light will not be seen, nor can he be held fast. No one will be able to trouble him in this way, whether he lives in the world or leaves the world. He has already received the Truth in images, and the World has become the Aeon. For the Aeon already exists for him as Pleroma, and he exists in this way. It is revealed to him alone, since it is not hidden in darkness and night but is hidden in a perfect Day and a holy Night.

=== Mary Magdalene ===
Much of the Gospel of Philip is dedicated to a discussion of marriage as a sacred mystery, and two passages directly refer to Mary Magdalene and her close relationship with Jesus:

There were three who always walked with the Lord: Mary, his mother, and her sister, and Magdalene, the one who was called his companion. His sister and his mother and his companion were each a Mary.

In different places in the Gospel of Philip, Mary Magdalene is called Jesus's companion, partner or consort, using Coptic variants of the word koinōnos (κοινωνός), of Greek origin, or the word hōtre, of Egyptian origin. In this passage koinōnos is used. Koinōnos has a range of possible meanings: at root, it denotes a "person engaged in fellowship or sharing with someone or in something", but what exactly a koinōnos "can share with his or her partner can take many forms, ranging from a common enterprise or experience to a shared business". In the Bible, koinōnos is sometimes used to refer to a spouse (Malachi 2:14; cf. 3 Maccabees 4:6), but is also used to refer to a "companion" in faith (Philemon 17), a co-worker in proclaiming the Gospel (2 Corinthians 8:23), or a business associate (Luke 5:10). The Gospel of Philip uses cognates of koinōnos and Coptic equivalents to refer to the literal pairing of men and women in marriage and sexual intercourse, but also metaphorically, referring to a spiritual partnership, and the reunification of the Gnostic Christian with the divine realm. And importantly, there are occasions in the Gospel of Philip when the regular Coptic word for wife is used directly in reference to people who are clearly spouses, suggesting that the term koinōnos is "reserved for a more specific usage" in the Gospel of Philip.

That passage is also interesting for its mention of Jesus's sister (Jesus's unnamed sisters are mentioned in the New Testament at Mark 6:3), although the text is confusing on that point: she appears to be described first as the sister of Jesus's mother Mary (also mentioned in the Gospel of John, possibly the same person as Mary of Clopas), then as the sister of Jesus, although this may be a translation problem.

The other passage, purportedly referring to Jesus kissing Mary Magdalene, is incomplete because of damage to the original manuscript. Several words are missing. Guesses as to what they were are shown below in brackets. Most notably there is a hole in the manuscript after the phrase "and used to kiss her [often] on her...." But the passage appears to describe Jesus kissing Magdalene, apparently described as "barren" and "the mother of the angels" at the beginning of the relevant paragraph and using a parable to explain to the disciples why he loved her more than he loved them:

As for Wisdom who is called "the barren", she is the mother [of the] angels. And the companion of the [...] Mary Magdalene. [... loved] her more than [all] the disciples [and used to] kiss her [often] on her [...]. The rest of [the disciples...] They said to him, "Why do you love her more than all of us?" The Savior answered and said to them, "Why do I not love you like her? When a blind man and one who sees are both together in the darkness, they are no different from one another. When the light comes, then he who sees will see the light, and he who is blind will remain in darkness.

Some scholars speculate that "hand" is the word after "kiss her... on her". But it may have been cheek, forehead or feet to simply show respect. (Note: In the critical edition edited by Bentley Layton, the feet, a cheek and the forehead of Mary are raised as possibilities.) Isenberg 1996, pp. 139- translates it as "on her mouth".

== Problems concerning the text ==
The Gospel of Philip is a text that reveals some connections with Early Christian writings of the Gnostic traditions. It is a series of logia or aphoristic utterances, most of them apparently quotations and excerpts of lost writings, without any attempt at a narrative context. The main theme concerns the value of sacraments. Scholars debate whether the original language was Syriac or Greek. Wesley W. Isenberg, the text's translator, places the date "perhaps as late as the 2nd half of the 3rd century" and places its probable origin in Syria due to its references to Syriac words and eastern baptismal practices as well as its ascetic outlook. The online Early Christian Writings site gives it a date c. 180–250. Meyer gives its date as "2nd or 3rd century".

== Interpretation ==
The text has been interpreted by Isenberg 1996, p. 141 as a Christian Gnostic sacramental catechesis. Bentley Layton identified it as a Valentinian anthology of excerpts, and Elaine Pagels and Martha Lee Turner have seen it as possessing a consistent and Valentinian theology. It is dismissed by Catholic author Ian Wilson who argues that it "has no special claim to an early date, and seems to be merely a Mills and Boon-style fantasy of a type not uncommon among Christian apocryphal literature of the 3rd and 4th centuries".

== See also ==
- List of Gospels
- The Wedding of the Great Shishlam, a Mandaean wedding ritual text
