= Axionicus of Antioch =

3rd-century Gnostic

Axionicus (Ancient Greek: Ἀξιόνικος) of Antioch was a Gnostic associated with the early Christian spiritual movement known as Valentinianism. He was a contemporary of Heracleon and Ptolemy, and was mentioned as still living in Tertullian's work Adversus Valentinianos, so we know he lived around the late 2nd and early 3rd century CE.

While relatively obscure now, he was in his time a major figure of Valentinianism. The author of Refutation of All Heresies describes him as the leading figure of eastern Valentinianism. Tertullian thought of him as being the most devoted of the followers of Valentinus, writing "Axionicus of Antioch alone ... respects the memory of Valentinus by keeping fully the rules of his system." The eastern Valentinians held that the body of Jesus Christ was primarily "spiritual", as opposed to "psychic" or "material" (being the three natures that can compose men, in the Valentinian system).

The Gospel of Philip has no consensus about its geographical origin, but if it originates in Antioch -- as is sometimes suggested by scholars -- it may be that this text was associated with Axionicus and his community.
