= Colarbasians =

In Christian Gnostic religious history, the Colarbasians (Hippol., Ps. Tert.; Colorbasus, Iren., Epiph., Theodoret, Philast. cod., Aug.; C. Bassus Philast. codd.) were a supposed sect of the 2nd century, deemed heretics, so called from their leader Colarbasus, a disciple of Valentinus. Colarbasus, along with Marcus, another disciple of Valentinus, was said to maintain the whole plenitude, and perfection of truth and religion, to be contained in the Greek alphabet; and that it was for this reason that Jesus was called the Alpha and Omega.

== Analysis ==
The name occurs first, and that only incidentally, in a solitary passage of Irenaeus (i. 14, 1) which has been the subject of much discussion.

This Marcus then, declaring that he alone was the matrix and receptacle of the Sige of Colorbasus, inasmuch as he was only-begotten, has brought to the birth in some such way as follows that which was committed to him of the defective Enthymesis.

Marcus, Irenaeus seems to say, boasted that he alone was allowed to become the womb and receptacle of the Sigé (Silence) of Colarbasus; the offspring to which he gave birth being the statement and revelation recorded afterwards. There is no previous mention of Colarbasus. Irenaeus has for six pages been speaking of Marcus alone. Eleven pages back he refers briefly to "a certain other Illustrious teacher of theirs" [the Valentinians]; but there is no coincidence of doctrine, and nothing to suggest that the nameless, or obscurely named [Epiphanes], heretic was himself Colarbasus, as some have supposed.

=== Sources ===
According to Philaster (Haer. 43) Colarbasus taught after Marcus and "in like manner:" his two lines of description are merely a vague echo of Marcosian doctrine. Pseudo-Tertullian (15) combines the two names indistinguishably in one article. Their common source, the lost Compendium of Hippolytus, can have contained no special information about Colarbasus. When Hippolytus wrote the great later treatise Against all Heresies, he was evidently not better instructed. At the beginning of the sixth book he promises to describe "the doctrines held by Marcus and Colarbasus;" he devotes in due course twenty-three pages to a repetition of Irenaeus's account of Marcus; and at the end he considers he has sufficiently shown who [viz., Pythagoreans and astrologers] were the masters of Marcus and Colarbasus, "the successors in the school of Valentinus:" yet not a word is given to Colarbasus separately. Once elsewhere (iv. 13) Colarbasus is said to have "endeavoured to expound theology by measures and numbers;" but this is simply the Marcosian method.

The proceeding of Epiphanius of Salamis is more audacious. He has a separate article (Haer, xxxv. 258–262) on Colarbasus, the composition of which has been fully laid bare by R. A. Lipsius (Zur Quellengesch. d. Epiph. 167 f.). The long account of Marcus in Irenaeus is preceded by a series of short notices (mostly without names) of the chief doctrines maintained by different branches of the great Valentinian sect. The passage relating to one group distinguished as "those who are reputed to be the wiser among them," is transferred bodily by Epiphanius to Colarbasus, and with it, stranger still, the next paragraph down to the end of the chapter, though it sets forth in single sentences the doctrines of no less than five sets of Valentinians about the Saviour. The passage about the "wise" group immediately follows one on Ptolemaeus; and accordingly Epiphanius makes Colarbasus to spring from "the root of Ptolemaeus," as well as to borrow from Marcus, and attributes to him a purpose of devising a greater and more ingenious scheme than his predecessors.

Theodoret (Haer. Fab. i. 12) merely abbreviates Epiphanius, changing at the same time "Colorbasus" into "the Colorbasians." A doubtful conjecture has brought Colarbasus into a single sentence of Tertullian (adv. Val. 4), where at most no more is said than that a road was marked out for him by Valentinus; Ptolemaeus is named next, then Heracleon, Secundus, and Marcus.

All these various writers against heresies are known to have learned, directly or indirectly, from Irenaeus; and every statement of theirs about Colarbasus can be at once traced, through transcription or immediate inference, to something in the text of Irenaeus not far distant from the place where the name of Colarbasus occurs. On the other hand, the reports of doctrine have little or nothing in common, Hippolytus and his followers make Colarbasus to have taught only what Marcus taught: Epiphanius and his copyist fathers upon him the discordant views of a miscellaneous cluster of Valentinians.

=== The Voice of Four ===
The credit of detecting the cause of the confusion belongs to C. A. Heumann (Hamburgische Vermischte Bibliothek, 1743, i. 145). He got rid of the mysterious double of Marcus by pointing out that Chol-arba (כלארבע) means "All-Four" i.e. the divine Tetrad, which in the scheme of Marcus stood at the head of the Pleroma. He was less successful in dealing with the details of the text: and F. C. Baur (K.G. d. 3 erst. Jahrh. i. 204) has rightly substituted Col (קול) for Chol (The Voice of Four for All-Four). Volkmar explains the appearance of s by the Aramaic commutation of ע with צ, and the o of several authorities by Theodoret's Kossianos for Kassianos: Colassae and Colossae afford a still better illustration.

=== Sigé ===
Both the Tetrad and Sigé appear in the context as if they made revelations to Marcus, but (what has not been sufficiently observed) in different ways. When Irenaeus is simply recording what he found in his Marcosian authority, he speaks of the Tetrad or Tetractys. Thus (66–69):—

That the Tetrad herself came down to him from the highest and from the invisible [and innominable] places in female form, because, it is said, the world could not bear her male [element], and that she made known who she was ... And that the Tetractys, when she had explained this to him, said 'And I will also show thee' ... And as Marcus waited expecting her [Aletheia or Truth, another aeon] to say something more, the Tetractys again came forward and spoke ...

Sigé on the other hand, is mentioned only when Irenaeus speaks in his own person, and always with a touch of sarcasm. Thus (68–78):

... the letters of which Marcus's Sigé (he Markou Sigê) pronounced (edogmatise) the 'Forefather' to consist ... and he [apparently 'Perfect Reason'] uses as his minister the greatness of the seven numbers, as says Marcus's Sigé ... and the seventh [heaven] shouts out the letter O, as Marcus's Sigé positively affirms, she who babbles at great length but says nothing true ... Thus then the all-wise Sigé announces to him the origin of the 24 letters ... Who will endure that Sigé of thine that babbles so much, her who names the Innominable, and declares the Unutterable, and expounds the Unsearchable?

It may therefore be questioned whether Marcus ever represented Sigé as herself visiting him. Two passages indeed suggest pretty clearly that he held her to be faithful to her name. Speaking of "Truth," virtually the alphabet, also called Man, he says (69) that she "is the fountain of every speech, and the beginning of every voice, and the utterance of everything unutterable, and the mouth of the unspoken Sigé (tês siôpômenês Sigês). Again we hear (64) that Marcosians were taught to offer a prayer for deliverance from "the Judge" to a female divinity addressed as "thou that sittest beside God and the mystic Sigé before the aeons" (or ages: ô paredre theou k. t. l.). This address supplies the required clue, for the divinity is called "the Mother," in a passage almost immediately preceding the occurrence of the name Colarbasus; and elsewhere (75: cf. 84) "the Mother of the Universe" is identified with "the first Tetrad." Sigé herself then doubtless remains hidden above; but her mysteries are made known to Marcus by the Tetrad, the Colarbas or Voice of Four, who must be the (nameless) "most mighty power from the invisible and innominable places," to whom he boasted that he owed his "knowledge," as we read in Irenaeus's first paragraph about him (60).

The difficulty of the primary phrase tês Kolarbasou Sigês remains. In the absence of a second article, it can only mean "the Sigé of Colarbas" (or Colarbasus) instead of "the Colarbas (or Colarba) of Sigé," as the sense above elicited requires. The difficulty would be lightened, and the perplexing termination of Kolarbasou at the same time removed, by reading tês Kolarbas ek Sigês, "the Colarba (Voice of Four) proceeding out of Sigé (Silence)." In round continuous uncials the change would be easy, EK and OY having much resemblance when written. The two names would thus stand in the right relation to each other. The phrase however would still be briefer than we should expect. The sudden appearance of the Hebrew term remains likewise unaccounted for. The obscurity evidently lies in the original text of Irenaeus, if not of the authority whom he followed; and it was found as embarrassing in the 3rd and 4th centuries as now. It was only disguised, not removed, by supposing a heretic named Colarbasus.

== Bibliography ==
- This article uses text from A Dictionary of Christian Biography, Literature, Sects and Doctrines, Being a Continuation of "The Dictionary of the Bible" by William Smith and Henry Wace.
