= Kenoma =

Concept in Gnosticism

In Gnosticism, kenoma (kenoma, κένωμα) is the concept of emptiness that corresponds to the lower world of phenomena, as opposed to the concept of pleroma, or fullness, which corresponds to the Platonic world of ideal forms. Kenoma was used by the mid-2nd century Gnostic thinker and preacher Valentinius, who was among the early Christians who attempted to align Christianity with Middle Platonism. Employing a third concept of cosmos, what is manifest, Valentinian initiates could explain scripture in light of these three aspects of correlated existence.

== In Gnosticism ==
The pleroma is the abode of the Æons . . . they are, or they comprise, the eternal ideas or archetypes of the Platonic philosophy. . . . Separated from this celestial region by Horos . . . or Boundary . . . lies the ‘kenoma’ or ‘void’—the kingdom of this world, the region of matter and material things, the land of shadow and darkness. Here is the empire of the Demiurge or Creator, who is not a celestial Æon at all, but was born in this very void over which he reigns. Here reside all those phenomenal, deceptive, transitory things, of which the eternal counterparts are found only in the pleroma. . . . All things are set off one against another in these two regions: just as

The swan on still St Mary’s lake
Floats double, swan and shadow.

Not only have the thirty Æons their terrestrial counterparts; but their subdivisions also are represented in this lower region. The kenoma too has its ogdoad, its decad, its dodecad, like the pleroma. There is one Sophia in the supramundane region, and another in the mundane; there is one Christ who redeems the Æons in the spiritual world, and a second Christ who redeems mankind, or rather a portion of mankind, in the sensible world. There is an Æon Man and another Æon Ecclesia in the celestial kingdom, the ideal counterparts of the Human Race and the Christian Church in the terrestrial. . . . The topographical conception of the pleroma moreover is carried out in the details of the imagery. The second Sophia, called also Achamoth, is the desire, the offspring, of her elder namesake, separated from her mother, cast out of the pleroma, and left ‘stranded’ in the void beyond, being prevented from returning by the inexorable Horos who guards the frontier of the supramundane kingdom.

— Lightfoot, pp. 266–67

The ancient Greek term for emptiness or void (kenoma), as pertaining to Theodotus's exegesis of Gospel of John chapter 1 verse 3, is described in The Excerpta ex Theodoto of Clement of Alexandria.

== Hysterema ==
Elsewhere, the usual antithesis to Pleroma is not Kenoma, but Hysterema (ὑστέρημα). As the system is reported by Hippolytus (vi. 31, p. 180) this word is used as the complement of the word Pleroma, denoting all that is not included in the meaning of the latter word. Thus the Horos or boundary is described as separating the Hysterema from the Pleroma, itself partaking of the nature of both; but preserving all inside fixed and immovable by permitting nothing from without to enter. We can understand in the same sense the passage in Epiphanius, where the same name is given to the Demiurge; for it appears in the case of the word Hebdomas that the Valentinians gave to the Demiurge the name of the realm over which he ruled, and from which he had his origin. Marcus speaks of the Demiurge as karpos hysterematos Marcus would seem to have used the word Hysterema, in the sense already explained, to denote the region outside the Pleroma, where, in his usual way of finding mysteries in numbers, he regards the former region as symbolised by the numbers up to 99 counted on the left hand, the latter by 100 counted on the right hand. As Marcus uses the word Pleroma in the plural number, so he may have used Hysterema also in the plural number to denote the powers belonging to these regions respectively. But it seems to us likely that the assertion that Marcus counted a second or a third Hysterema is but an inference drawn by Irenaeus himself, from the fact that he found the name karpos hysterematos applied not only to the Demiurge, but to his mother, Sophia Achamoth. Irenaeus ordinarily uses the word, usually rendered labes by the old Latin translator, in no technical sense, but with the general meaning of defect, commonly joining it with the words agnoia and pathos. The word Hysterema is found also in Excerpt. Theod. 2, 22, in the latter passage in a technical sense; but the context does not enable us to fix its meaning. Hysterema is said by Epiphanius to have been used as a technical word by Basilides.

== See also ==
- Dyad (Greek philosophy)
- Tzimtzum
