= Sophia (Gnosticism) =

Feminine figure in Gnosticism

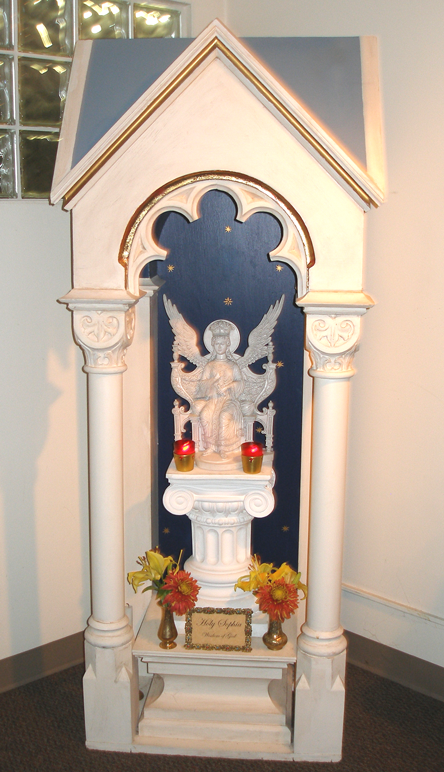
Statue of Sophia in an Ecclesia Gnostica chapel in Los Angeles, California.

Sophia (Koine Greek: Σοφíα "Wisdom", Coptic: ⲧⲥⲟⲫⲓⲁ "the Sophia") is a figure, along with Knowledge (γνῶσις gnosis, Coptic: ⲧⲥⲱⲟⲩⲛ tsōwn), among many of the early Christian knowledge theologies grouped by the heresiologist Irenaeus as gnostikoi (γνωστικοί), "knowing". Gnosticism is a 17th-century term expanding the definition of Irenaeus' groups to include other syncretic faiths and the Greco-Roman mysteries.

In Gnosticism, Sophia is a feminine figure, analogous to the human soul but also simultaneously one of the feminine aspects of God. Gnostics held that she was the syzygy, or female twin, of Jesus, i.e. the Bride of Christ, and the Holy Spirit of the Trinity. She is occasionally referred to by the term Achamōth (Ἀχαμώθ, Hebrew: חכמה chokmah) and as Prunikos (Προύνικος). In the Nag Hammadi texts, Sophia is the highest aeon or anthropic emanation of the godhead.

== Gnostic mythos ==
Many Gnostic systems, particularly those of the Syrian or Egyptian, teach that the universe began with an original, unknowable God referred to as the Parent, Bythos ('Depth') or the Monad. From this primordial source, a series of emanations, or Aeons, emerged. These Aeons, which often appear in male-female pairs called syzygies, collectively form the Pleroma, or 'Fullness' of the divine. This concept emphasizes that the Aeons are not separate from the divine but are symbolic representations of its attributes.

The transition from the immaterial to the material, from the noumenal to the sensible, is brought about by a flaw, or a passion, or a sin, in one of the Aeons. In most versions of the Gnostic mythos, it is Sophia who brings about this instability in the Pleroma, in turn bringing about the creation of materiality. According to some Gnostic texts, the crisis occurs as a result of Sophia trying to emanate without her syzygy or, in another tradition, because she tries to breach the barrier between herself and the unknowable Bythos.

After cataclysmically falling from the Pleroma, Sophia's fear and anguish of losing her life (just as she lost the light of the One) causes confusion and longing to return to it. Because of these longings, matter (Greek: hylē, ὕλη) and soul (Greek: psychē, ψυχή) accidentally come into existence. The creation of the Demiurge, also known as Yaldabaoth, is also a mistake made during this exile. The Demiurge proceeds to create the physical world in which we live, ignorant of Sophia, who nevertheless manages to infuse some spiritual spark or pneuma into his creation.

In the Pistis Sophia, Christ is sent to bring Sophia back into the Pleroma. Christ enables her to again see the light, bringing her knowledge of the spirit (Greek: pneuma, πνευμα). Christ is then sent to earth in the form of the man Jesus to give men the gnosis needed to rescue themselves from the physical world and return to the spiritual world. For the Gnostics, the drama of the redemption of the Sophia through Christ or the Logos is the central drama of the universe. The Sophia resides in all humans as the divine spark.

== Book of Proverbs ==
Jewish Alexandrine religious philosophy was much occupied with the concept of the Divine Sophia, as the revelation of God's inward thought, and assigned to her not only the formation and ordering of the natural universe (comp. Clem. Hom. xvi. 12) but also the communication of knowledge to mankind. In Proverbs 8 Wisdom is described as God's Counsellor and Workmistress (Master-workman, R.V.), who dwelt beside Him before the Creation of the world and sported continually before Him.

Following the description given in the Book of Proverbs, a dwelling place was assigned by the Gnostics to the Sophia and her relation to the upper world was defined as well as to the seven planetary powers placed under her. The seven spheres or heavens were for the ancients the highest regions of the created universe. They were thought of as seven circles rising one above another and dominated by the seven Archons, the Hebdomad.

Above the highest of the regions and vaulting over it, was the Ogdoad, the sphere of immutability, which was nigh to the spiritual world (Clement of Alexandria, Stromata, iv. 25, 161; comp. vi. 16, 138 sqq.). In Proverbs 9:1, "Wisdom has built her house; she has hewn out its seven pillars." These were interpreted as the planetary heavens; the habitation of the Sophia herself was placed above the Hebdomad in the Ogdoad (Excerpt. ex Theodot. 8, 47). It is said further of the same divine wisdom (Proverbs 8:2), "She takes her stand at the topmost heights, by the wayside, at the crossroads." According to the Gnostic interpretation, the Sophia thus has her dwelling place above the created universe between the upper and lower world, between the Pleroma and the ektismena. She sits at "the gates of the mighty", i.e. at the approaches to the realms of the seven Archons, and at the "entrances" to the upper realm of light, her praise is sung. The Sophia is therefore the highest ruler over the visible universe and at the same time the mediator between the upper and the lower realms. She shapes this mundane universe after the heavenly prototypes, and forms the seven star-circles with their Archons under whose dominion are placed, according to the astrological conceptions of antiquity, the fates of all earthly things, and more especially of man. She is "the mother" or "the mother of the living". (Epiph. Haer. 26, 10). As coming from above, she is herself of pneumatic essence, the mētēr phōteinē (Epiph. 40, 2) or the anō dynamis (Epiph. 39, 2) from which all pneumatic souls draw their origin.

== Descent ==
In reconciling the doctrine of the pneumatic nature of the Sophia with the dwelling-place assigned her, according to the Proverbs, in the kingdom of the midst, and so outside the upper realm of light, there was envisioned a descent of Sophia from her heavenly home, the Pleroma, into the void (kenōma) beneath it. The concept was that of a seizure or robbery of light, or of an outburst and diffusion of light-dew into the kenōma, occasioned by a vivifying movement in the upper world. But inasmuch as the light brought down into the darkness of this lower world was thought of and described as involved in suffering, this suffering must be regarded as a punishment. This inference was further aided by the Platonic notion of a spiritual fall.

== Syrian Gnosis ==
The Sophia mythos has in the various Gnostic systems undergone great variety of treatment. The oldest, the Syrian Gnosis, referred to the Sophia, the formation of the lower world and the production of its rulers the Archons; and along with this they also ascribed to her the preservation and propagation of the spiritual seed.

=== Formation of the lower world ===
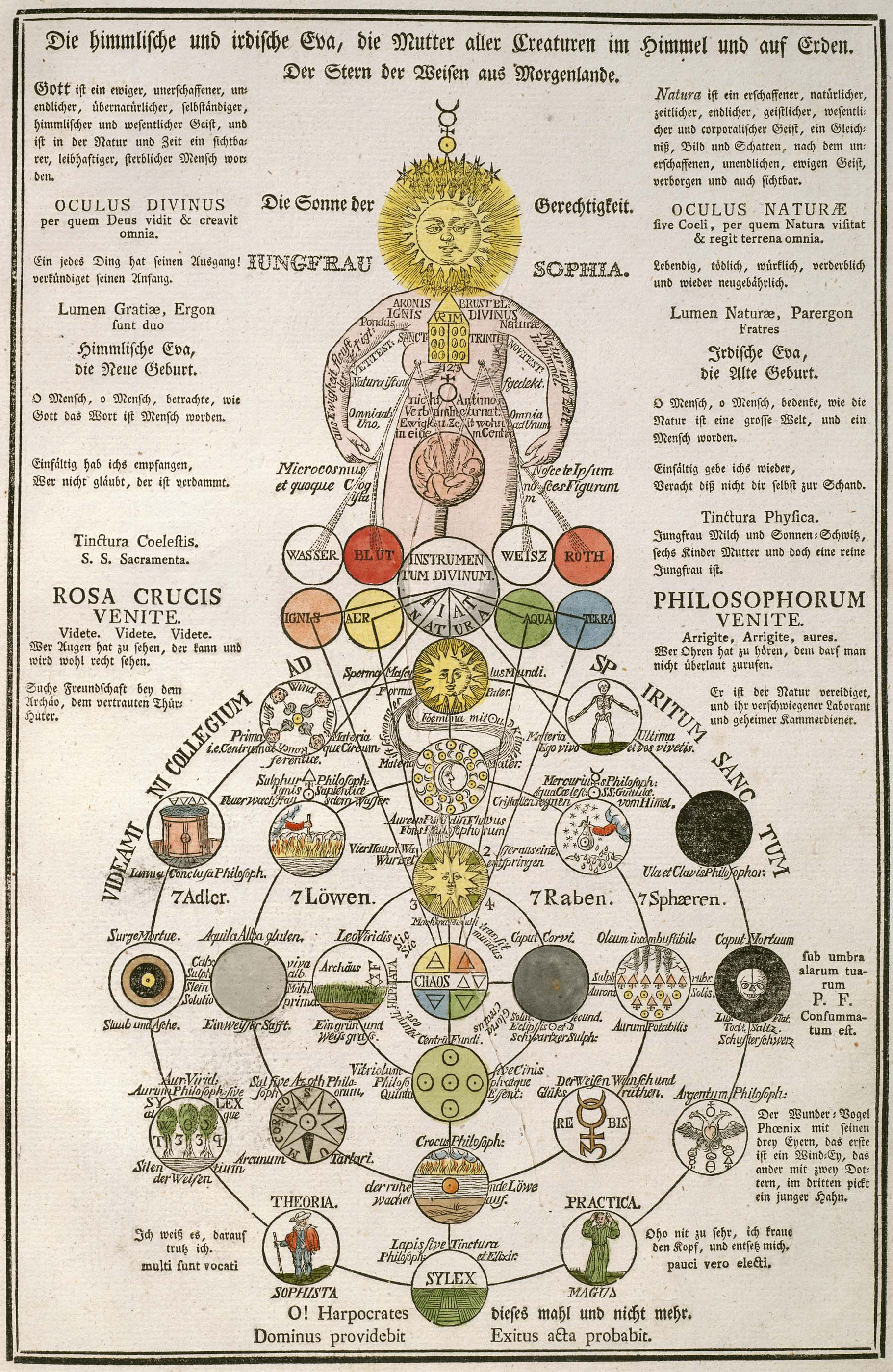
A mystical depiction of Sophia from Geheime Figuren der Rosenkreuzer, Altona, 1785

As reported and criticised by Irenaeus in his account of certain Gnostic sects in Against Heresies, the great Mother-principle of the universe appears as the first woman, the Holy Spirit (rūha d'qudshā) moving over the waters, and is also called the mother of all living. The four material elements are inside her—water, earth, air, and life. With her, these combine into two supreme masculine lights, the first and the second man, the Father and the Son, the latter being also designated as the Father's ennoia. From their union proceeds the third imperishable light, the third man, Christ. But unable to support the abounding fullness of this light, the mother in giving birth to Christ, suffers a portion of this light to overflow on the left side. While, then, Christ as dexios (He of the right hand) mounts upward with his mother into the imperishable Aeon, that other light which has overflowed on the left hand, sinks down into the lower world, and there produces matter. And this is the Sophia, called also Aristera (she of the left hand), Prouneikos and the male-female.

There is here, as yet, no thought of a fall, properly so called, as in the Valentinian system. The power which has thus overflowed leftwards, makes a voluntary descent into the lower waters, confiding in its possession of the spark of true light. It is, moreover, evident that though mythologically distinguished from the humectatio luminis (Greek: ikmas phōtos, ἰκμὰς φωτός), the Sophia is yet, really nothing else but the light-spark coming from above, entering this lower material world, and becoming here the source of all formation, and of both the higher and the lower life. She swims over the waters, and sets their hitherto immoveable mass in motion, driving them into the abyss, and taking to herself a bodily form from the hylē. She compasses about, and is laden with material every kind of weight and substance, so that, but for the essential spark of light, she would be sunk and lost in the material. Bound to the body which she has assumed and weighed down thereby, she seeks in vain to make her escape from the lower waters, and hasten upwards to rejoin her heavenly mother. Not succeeding in this endeavour, she seeks to preserve, at least, her light-spark from being injured by the lower elements, raises herself by its power to the realm of the upper region, and there spreading herself out she forms out of her own bodily part, the dividing wall of the visible firmament, but still retains the aquatilis corporis typus. Finally seized with a longing for the higher light, she finds, at length, in herself, the power to raise herself even above the heaven of her own forming, and to fully lay aside her corporeity. The body thus abandoned is called "Woman from Woman".

=== Creation and redemption ===
The narrative proceeds to tell of the formation of the seven Archons by Sophia herself, of the creation of man, which "the mother" (i.e. not the first woman, but the Sophia) uses as a means to deprive the Archons of their share of light, of the perpetual conflict on his mother's part with the self-exalting efforts of the Archons, and of her continuous striving to recover again and again the light-spark hidden in human nature, till, at length, Christ comes to her assistance and in answer to her prayers, proceeds to draw all the sparks of light to Himself, unites Himself with the Sophia as the bridegroom with the bride, descends on Jesus who has been prepared, as a pure vessel for His reception, by Sophia, and leaves him again before the crucifixion, ascending with Sophia into the world or Aeon which will never pass away (Irenaeus, i. 30; Epiph. 37, 3, sqq.; Theodoret, h. f. i. 14).

=== As world-soul ===
In this system the original cosmogonic significance of the Sophia still stands in the foreground. The antithesis of Christus and Sophia, as He of the right (ho dexios) and She of the Left (hē aristera), as male and female, is but a repetition of the first Cosmogonic Antithesis in another form. The Sophia herself is but a reflex of the "Mother of all living" and is therefore also called "Mother". She is the formatrix of heaven and earth, for as much as mere matter can only receive form through the light which, coming down from above has interpenetrated the dark waters of the hylē; but she is also at the same time the spiritual principle of life in creation, or, as the world-soul the representative of all that is truly pneumatic in this lower world: her fates and experiences represent typically those of the pneumatic soul which has sunk down into chaos.

== Prunikos ==
For I am the first and the last.
I am the honored one and the loved one.
I am the holy one.

— The Thunder, Perfect Mind

In the Gnostic system described by Irenaeus (I. xxi.; see Ophites) the name "Prunikos" (Greek: Προυνικος) several times takes the place of Sophia in the relation of her story. The name Prunikos is also given to Sophia in the account of the kindred Barbeliot system, given in the preceding chapter of Irenaeus. Celsus, who shows that he had met with some Ophite work, exhibits acquaintance with the name Prunikos (Orig. Adv. Cels. vi. 34) a name which Origen recognizes as Valentinian. That this Ophite name had really been adopted by the Valentinians is evidenced by its occurrence in a Valentinian fragment preserved by Epiphanius (Epiph. Haer. xxxi. 5). Epiphanius also introduces Prunikos as a technical word in the system of the Simonians (Epiph. Haer. xxi. 2) of those whom he describes under the head of Nicolaitans (Epiph. Haer. xxv. 3, 4) and of the Ophites (Epiph. Haer. xxxvii. 4, 6).

=== Etymology ===
Neither Irenaeus nor Origen indicates that he knew anything as to the meaning of this word; and we have no better information on this subject than a conjecture of Epiphanius (Epiph. Haer. xxv. 48). He says that the word means "wanton" or "lascivious", for that the Greeks had a phrase concerning a man who had debauched a girl, Eprounikeuse tautēn. One feels some hesitation in accepting this explanation. Epiphanius was deeply persuaded of the filthiness of Gnostic morals, and habitually put the worst interpretation on their language. If the phrase reported by Epiphanius had been common, it is strange that instances of its use should not have been quoted from the Greek comic writers. It need not be denied that Epiphanius had heard the phrase employed, but innocent words come to be used in an obscene sense, as well by those who think double entendre witty, as by those who modestly avoid the use of plainer language. The primary meaning of the word prouneikos seems to be a porter, or bearer of burdens, the derivation being from enenkein, the only derivation indeed that the word seems to admit of. Then, modifying its meaning like the word agoraios, it came to be used in the sense of a turbulent violent person. The only distinct confirmation of the explanation of Epiphanius is that Hesychius (s. v. Skitaloi) has the words aphrodisiōn kai tēs prounikias tēs nykterinēs. This would be decisive, if we could be sure that these words were earlier in date than Epiphanius.

In favour of the explanation of Epiphanius is the fact, that in the Gnostic cosmogonical myths, the imagery of sexual passion is constantly introduced. It seems on the whole probable that prouneikos is to be understood in the sense of propherēs which has for one of its meanings "precocious in respect of sexual intercourse". According to Ernst Wilhelm Möller (1860) the name is possibly meant to indicate her attempts to entice away again from the lower Cosmic Powers the seed of Divine light. In the account given by Epiphanius (Haer. 37:6) the allusion to enticements to sexual intercourse which is involved in this name, becomes more prominent.

However, in the Exegesis on the Soul text found at Nag Hammadi, the soul is likened to a woman which fell from perfection into prostitution, and that the Father will elevate her again to her original perfect state. In this context, the female personification of the soul resembles the passion of Sophia as Prunikos.

== The womb ==
Nigh related to this is the notion widely diffused among Gnostic sects of the pure ' (womb) whence the whole world is supposed to have issued. As according to the Italian Valentinians the Soter opens the mētra of the lower Sophia, (the Enthymēsis), and so occasions the formation of the universe (Iren. I. 3, 4) . So Epiphanius reports the following cosmogony as that of a branch of the Nicolaitans:

Certain others of them... say that there were Darkness, Depth and Water, and that the Spirit in between them formed their boundary. But Darkness was angry and enraged at Spirit, and this Darkness sprang up, embraced it, they say, and sired something called “Womb.” After Womb was born it conceived by Spirit itself. A certain four aeons were emitted from Womb, but fourteen others from the four, and this was the origin of “right” and “left,” darkness and light. But later, after all these, a certain ignoble aeon was emitted. It had intercourse with the Womb we mentioned above, and by this ignoble aeon and Womb gods, angels, demons and seven spirits were produced... They have given it away by saying first that there is one “Father,” and later designating many gods...

— Epiphanius, Haer. 25, 5

The Sethians (Hippolytus. Philosophum. v. 7) teach in like manner that from the first concurrence (syndromē) of the three primeval principles arose heaven and earth as a megalē tis idea sphragidos. These have the form of a mētra with the omphalos in the midst. The pregnant mētra therefore contains within itself all kinds of animal forms in the reflex of heaven and earth and all substances found in the middle region. This mētra also encounters us in the great Apophasis ascribed to Simon where it is also called Paradise and Eden as being the locality of man's formation.

These cosmogonic theories have their precedent in the Thalatth or Tiamat of Syrian mythology, the life-mother of whom Berossus has so much to relate, or in the world-egg out of which when cloven asunder heaven and earth and all things proceed. The name of this Berossian Thalatth meets us again among the Peratae of the Philosophumena (Hippolytus, Philosophum. v. 9) and is sometimes mistakenly identified with that of the sea—thalassa.

== Gnosis ==
Among the four and twenty Angels which she bears to Elohim, and which form the world out of her members, the second female angelic form is called Achamōs [Achamōth]. Like to this legend of the Philosophumena concerning the Gnosis is that Ra, the Egyptian Sun God from the Upper World had had sexual intercourse with the Earth as with a woman.

== Doctrines of the Barbeliotae ==
The Barbeliotae (also known as Barbelo-Gnostics) held theological views closely related to the Gnostic systems described by Irenaeus in his polemical work Adversus Haereses (c. 180 AD). Their mythology centers on the figure of Barbelo, whom some scholars identify as a personification of the "Upper Tetrad," though she is distinct from the figure of Sophia.

In the Barbeliotae cosmology, Sophia—also referred to as the Spiritus Sanctus or Prunikos (the "Lustful One")—is the offspring of the first angel attending the Monogenes (the Only-Begotten). Observing that other entities within the Pleroma possessed a syzygos (divine consort), Sophia sought a partner of her own. Failing to find a suitable match in the upper celestial realms, she turned her gaze toward the lower regions and eventually descended into the "deep" against the will of the Monadic Father.

In this lower realm, Sophia produced the Demiurge (referred to as the Proarchōn), a being characterized by ignorance and self-exaltation. Utilizing "pneumatic" (spiritual) powers stolen from his mother, the Demiurge proceeded to form the material world. Following these events, Sophia retreated from the lower depths and established her dwelling in the Ogdoad, located in the upper regions of the created cosmos.

== The Ophites ==
We meet this Sophia also among the Ophiana whose "Diagram" is described by Celsus and Origen, as well as among various Gnostic (Ophite) parties mentioned by Epiphanius. She is there called Sophia or Prunikos, the upper mother and upper power, and sits enthroned above the Hebdomad (the seven Planetary Heavens) in the Ogdoad (Origen, Against Celsus. vi. 31, 34, 35, 38; Epiphan. Haer. 25, 3 sqq. 26, 1,10. 39, 2; 40, 2). She is also occasionally called Parthenos (Orig. c. Cels. vi. 31) and again is elsewhere identified with the Barbelo or Barbero (Epiph. Haer. 25, 3; 26, 1, 10).

== Simon Magus ==
=== The Ennoia ===
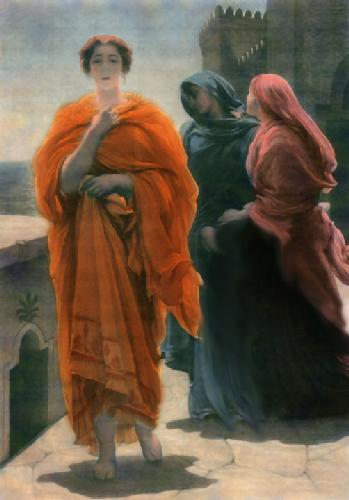
Helen on the Ramparts of Troy by Frederick Leighton; an incarnation of the Ennoia in the Simonian system

This mythos of the soul and her descent into this lower world, with her various sufferings and changing fortunes until her final deliverance, recurs in the Simonian system under the form of the All-Mother who issues as its first thought from the Hestōs or highest power of God. She generally bears the name Ennoia, but is also called Wisdom (Sophia), Ruler, Holy Spirit, Prunikos, Barbelo. Having sunk down from the highest heavens into the lowest regions, she creates angels and archangels, and these again create and rule the material universe. Restrained and held down by the power of this lower world, she is hindered from returning to the kingdom of the Father. According to one representation she suffers all manner of insult from the angels and archangels bound and forced again and again into fresh earthly bodies, and compelled for centuries to wander in ever new corporeal forms. According to another account she is in herself incapable of suffering, but is sent into this lower world and undergoes perpetual transformation in order to excite by her beauty the angels and powers, to impel them to engage in perpetual strife, and so gradually to deprive them of their store of heavenly light. The Hestōs himself at length comes down from the highest heaven in a phantasmal body in order to deliver the suffering Ennoia, and redeem the souls held in captivity by imparting gnosis to them.

=== The lost sheep ===
The most frequent designation of the Simonian Ennoia is "the lost" or "the wandering sheep". The Greek divinities Zeus and Athena were interpreted to signify Hestōs and his Ennoia, and in like manner the Tyrian sun-god Herakles-Melkart and the moon-goddess Selene-Astarte. So also the Homeric Helena, as the cause of quarrel between Greeks and Trojans, was regarded as a type of the Ennoia. The story which the fathers of the church handed down of the intercourse of Simon Magus with his consort Helena (Iren. i. 23; Tertullian de Anima, 34; Epiphanius Haer. 21; Pseudo-Tertullian Haer. 1; Philaster, Haer. 29; Philos. vi. 14, 15; Recogn. Clem. ii. 12; Hom. ii. 25), had probably its origin in this allegorical interpretation, according to Richard Adelbert Lipsius (1867).

=== Hestōs ===
In the Simonian Apophasis the great dynamis (also called Nous) and the great epinoia which gives birth to all things form a syzygy, from which proceeds the male-female Being, who is called Hestōs (Philos. vi. 13). Elsewhere nous and epinoia are called the upper-most of the three Simonian Syzygies, to which the Hestōs forms the Hebdomad: but on the other hand, nous and epinoia are identified with heaven and earth (Philos. vi. 9sqq.).

== Valentinus ==
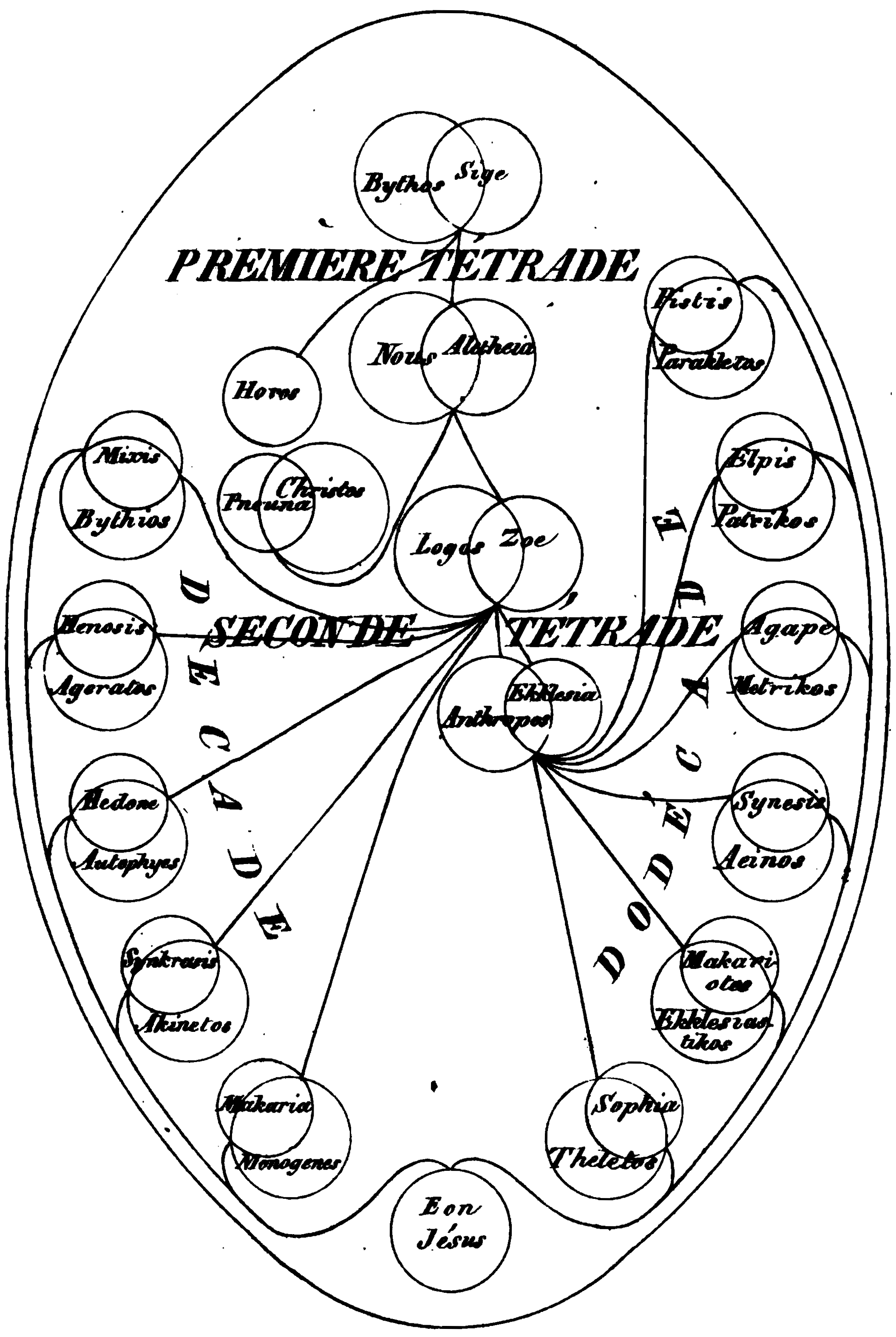
"Plérome de Valentin", from Histoire critique du Gnosticisme; Jacques Matter, 1826, Vol. II, Plate II

The most significant development of this Sophia mythos is found in the Valentinian system. The descent of the Sophia from the Pleroma is ascribed after Plato's manner to a fall, and as the final cause of this fall a state of suffering is indicated which has penetrated into the Pleroma itself. Sophia or Mētēr is in the doctrine of Valentinus the last, i.e. the thirtieth Aeon in the Pleroma, from which having fallen out, she now in remembrance of the better world which she has thus forsaken, gives birth to the Christus "with a shadow" (meta skias tinos). While Christus returns to the Pleroma, Sophia forms the Demiurge and this whole lower world out of the skia, a right and a left principle (Iren. Haer. i. 11, 1). For her redemption comes down to Sophia either Christus himself (Iren. i. 15, 3) or the Soter (Iren. i. 11, 1, cf. exc. ex Theod. 23; 41), as the common product of the Aeons, in order to bring her back to the Pleroma and unite her again with her syzygos.

=== Motive ===
The motive for the Sophia's fall was defined according to the Anatolian school to have lain therein, that by her desire to know what lay beyond the limits of the knowable she had brought herself into a state of ignorance and formlessness. Her suffering extends to the whole Pleroma. But whereas this is confirmed thereby in fresh strength, the Sophia is separated from it and gives birth outside it (by means of her ennoia, her recollections of the higher world), to the Christus who at once ascends into the Pleroma, and after this she produces an ousia amorphos, the image of her suffering, out of which the Demiurge and the lower world come into existence; last of all looking upwards in her helpless condition, and imploring light, she finally gives birth to the spermata tēs ekklēsias, the pneumatic souls. In the work of redemption the Soter comes down accompanied by the masculine angels who are to be the future syzygoi of the (feminine) souls of the Pneumatici, and introduces the Sophia along with these Pneumatici into the heavenly bridal chamber (Exc. ex Theod. 29–42; Iren. i. 2, 3). The same view, essentially meets us in the accounts of Marcus, (Iren. i. 18, 4; cf. 15, 3; 16, 1, 2; 17, 1) and in the Epitomators of the Syntagma of Hippolytus (Pseudo-Tertullian Haer. 12; Philaster, Haer. 38).

== Achamōth ==
The Italic school distinguished on the other hand a two-fold Sophia, the ano Sophia and the katō Sophia or Achamoth.

=== Ptolemaeus ===
==== Fall ====
According to the doctrine of Ptolemaeus and that of his disciples, the former of these separates herself from her syzygos, the thelētos through her audacious longing after immediate Communion with the Father of all, falls into a condition of suffering, and would completely melt away in this inordinate desire, unless the Horos had purified her from her suffering and established her again in the Pleroma. Her enthymēsis, on the other hand, the desire which has obtained the mastery over her and the consequent suffering becomes an amorphos kai aneideos ousia, which is also called an ektrōma, is separated from her and is assigned a place beyond the limits of the Pleroma.

==== The place of the Midst ====
From her dwelling-place above the Hebdomad, in the place of the Midst, she is also called Ogdoad (Ὀγδοάς), and further entitled Mētēr, Sophia also, and he Hierousalēm, Pneuma hagion, and (arsenikōs) Kyrios. In these names some partial reminiscences of the old Ophitic Gnosis are retained.

==== Repentance ====
The Achamoth first receives (by means of Christus and Pneuma hagion the Pair of Aeons within the Pleroma whose emanation is most recent), the morphōsis kat' ousian. Left alone in her suffering she has become endued with penitent mind (epistrophē). Now descends the son as the common fruit of the Pleroma, gives her the morphōsis kata gnōsin, and forms out of her various affections the Demiurge and the various constituents of this lower world. By his appointment the Achamoth produces the pneumatic seed (the ekklēsia).

==== Redemption ====
The end of the world's history is here also (as above) the introduction of the lower Sophia with all her pneumatic offspring into the Pleroma, and this intimately connected with the second descent of the Soter and his transient union with the psychical Christus; then follows the marriage-union of the Achamoth with the Soter and of the pneumatic souls with the angels (Iren. i. 1–7; exc. ex Theod. 43–65).

=== Two-fold Sophia ===
The same form of doctrine meets us also in Secundus, who is said to have been the first to have made the distinction of an upper and a lower Sophia (Iren. i. 11, 2), and in the account which the Philosophumena give us of a system which most probably referred to the school of Heracleon, and which also speaks of a double Sophia (Philos. vi.). The name Jerusalem also for the exō Sophia meets us here (Philos. vi. 29). It finds its interpretation in the fragments of Heracleon (ap. Origen. in Joann. tom. x. 19). The name Achamoth, on the other hand, is wanting both in Hippolytus and in Heracleon. One school among the Marcosians seems also to have taught a two-fold Sophia (Iren. i. 16, 3; cf. 21, 5).

=== Etymology ===
August Hahn (1819) debated whether the name Achamōth (Ἀχαμώθ) is originally derived from the Hebrew Chokmah (חָכְמָ֑ה), in Aramaic Ḥachmūth or whether it signifies 'She that brings forth'—'Mother.' The Syriac form Ḥachmūth is testified for us as used by Bardesanes (Ephraim, Hymn 55), the Greek form Hachamōth is found only among the Valentinians: the name however probably belongs to the oldest Syrian Gnosis.

== Bardesanes ==
Cosmogonic myths play their part also in the doctrine of Bardesanes. The locus foedus whereon the gods (or Aeons) measured and founded Paradise (Ephraim, Hymn 55) is the same as the impure mētra, which Ephraim is ashamed even to name (cf. also Ephraim, Hymn 14). The creation of the world is brought to pass through the son of the living one and the Rūha d' Qudshā, the Holy Spirit, with whom Ḥachmūth is identical, but in combination with "creatures", i.e. subordinate beings which co-operate with them (Ephraim, Hymn 3). It is not expressly so said, and yet at the same time is the most probable assumption, that as was the case with the father and mother so also their offspring the son of the Living One, and the Rūha d' Qudshā or Ḥachmūth, are to be regarded as a Syzygy. This last (the Ḥachmūth) brings forth the two daughters, the "Shame of the Dry Land" i.e. the mētra, and the "Image of the Waters" i.e. the Aquatilis Corporis typus, which is mentioned in connection with the Ophitic Sophia (Ephraim, Hymn 55). Beside which, in a passage evidently referring to Bardesanes, air, fire, water, and darkness are mentioned as aeons (Īthyē: Hymn 41) These are probably the "Creatures" to which in association with the Son and the Rūha d' Qudshā, Bardesanes is said to have assigned the creation of the world.

Though much still remains dark as to the doctrine of Bardesanes we cannot nevertheless have any right to set simply aside the statements of Ephraim, who remains the oldest Syrian source for our knowledge of the doctrine of this Syrian Gnostic, and deserves therefore our chief attentions. Bardesanes, according to Ephraim, is able also to tell of the wife or maiden who having sunk down from the Upper Paradise offers up prayers in her dereliction for help from above, and on being heard returns to the joys of the Upper Paradise (Ephraim, Hymn 55).

== Acts of Thomas ==
These statements of Ephraim are further supplemented by the Acts of Thomas in which various hymns have been preserved which are either compositions of Bardesanes himself, or at any rate are productions of his school.

=== Hymn of the Pearl ===
In the Syriac text of the Acts, we find the Hymn of the Pearl, where the soul which has been sent down from her heavenly home to fetch the pearl guarded by the serpent, but has forgotten here below her heavenly mission until she is reminded of it by a letter from "the father, the mother, and the brother", performs her task, receives back again her glorious dress, and returns to her old home.

=== Ode to the Sophia ===
Of the other hymns which are preserved in the Greek version more faithfully than in the Syriac text which has undergone Catholic revision, the first deserving of notice is the Ode to the Sophia which describes the marriage of the "maiden" with her heavenly bridegroom and her introduction into the Upper Realm of Light. This "maiden", called "daughter of light", is not as the Catholic reviser supposes the Church, but Ḥachmūth (Sophia) over whose head the "king", i.e. the father of the living ones, sits enthroned; her bridegroom is, according to the most probable interpretation, the son of the living one, i.e. Christ. With her the living Ones i.e. pneumatic souls enter into the Pleroma and receive the glorious light of the living Father and praise along with "the living spirit" the "father of truth" and the "mother of wisdom".

=== First prayer of consecration ===
The Sophia is also invoked in the first prayer of consecration. She is there called the "merciful mother", the "consort of the masculine one", "revealant of the perfect mysteries", "Mother of the Seven Houses", "who finds rest in the eighth house", i.e. in the Ogdoad. In the second Prayer of Consecration she is also designated, the "perfect Mercy" and "Consort of the Masculine One", but is also called "Holy Spirit" (Syriac Rūha d' Qudshā) "Revealant of the Mysteries of the whole Magnitude", "hidden Mother", "She who knows the Mysteries of the Elect", and "she who partakes in the conflicts of the noble Agonistes" (i.e. of Christ, cf. exc. ex Theod. 58 ho megas agōnistēs Iēsous).

There is further a direct reminiscence of the doctrine of Bardesanes when she is invoked as the Holy Dove which has given birth to the two twins, i.e. the two daughters of the Rūha d' Qudshā (ap. Ephraim, Hymn 55).

== Pistis Sophia ==
A special and richly coloured development is given to the mythical form of the Sophia of the Gnostic book Pistis Sophia. The two first books of this writing to which the name Pistis Sophia properly belongs, treat for the greater part (pp. 42–181) of the fall, the Repentance, and the Redemption of the Sophia.

=== Fall ===
She has by the ordinance of higher powers obtained an insight into the dwelling-place appropriated to her in the spiritual world, namely, the thēsauros lucis which lies beyond the XIIIth Aeon. By her endeavours to direct thither her upward flight, she draws upon herself the enmity of the Authadēs, Archon of the XIIIth Aeon, and of the Archons of the XII Aeons under him; by these she is enticed down into the depths of chaos, and is there tormented in the greatest possible variety of ways, in order that she may thus incur the loss of her light-nature.

=== Repentance ===
In her utmost need she addresses thirteen penitent prayers (metanoiai) to the Upper Light. Step by step she is led upwards by Christus into the higher regions, though she still remains obnoxious to the assaults of the Archons, and is, after offering her XIIIth Metanoia, more vehemently attacked than ever, until at length Christus leads her down into an intermediate place below the XIIIth Aeon, where she remains until the consummation of the world, and sends up grateful hymns of praise and thanksgiving.

=== Redemption ===
The earthly work of redemption having been at length accomplished, the Sophia returns to her original celestial home. The peculiar feature in this representation consists in the further development of the philosophical ideas which find general expression in the Sophia mythos. According to Karl Reinhold von Köstlin (1854), Sophia is here not merely, as with Valentinus, the representative of the longing which the finite spirit feels for the knowledge of the infinite, but at the same time a type or pattern of faith, of repentance, and of hope. After her restoration she announces to her companions the twofold truth that, while every attempt to overstep the divinely ordained limits, has for its consequence suffering and punishment, so, on the other hand, the divine compassion is ever ready to vouchsafe pardon to the penitent.

=== Light-Maiden ===
We have a further reminiscence of the Sophia of the older Gnostic systems in what is said in the book Pistis Sophia of the Light-Maiden (parthenos lucis), who is there clearly distinguished from the Sophia herself, and appears as the archetype of Astraea, the Constellation Virgo. The station which she holds is in the place of the midst, above the habitation assigned to the Sophia in the XIIIth Aeon. She is the judge of (departed) souls, either opening for them or closing against them the portals of the light-realm (pp. 194–295). Under her stand yet seven other light-maidens with similar functions, who impart to pious souls their final consecrations (pp. 291 sq. 327 sq. 334). From the place of the parthenos lucis comes the sun-dragon, which is daily borne along by four light-powers in the shape of white horses, and so makes his circuit round the earth (p. 183, cf. pp. 18, 309).

== Manichaeism ==
This light-maiden (parthenos tou phōtos) encounters us also among the Manichaeans as exciting the impure desires of the Daemons, and thereby setting free the light which has hitherto been held down by the power of darkness (Dispuiat. Archelai et Manetis, c. 8, n. 11; Theodoret., h. f. I. 26). On the other hand, the place of the Gnostic Sophia is among Manichaeans taken by the "Mother of Life" (mētēr tēs zōēs), and by the World-Soul (psychē hapantōn), which on occasions is distinguished from the Life-Mother, and is regarded as diffused through all living creatures, whose deliverance from the realm of darkness constitutes the whole of the world's history (Titus of Bostra, adv. Manich. I., 29, 36, ed. Lagarde, p. 17 sqq. 23; Alexander Lycopolites c. 3; Epiphan. Haer. 66, 24; Acta dispatat. Archelai et Manetis, c. 7 sq. et passim). Their return to the world of light is described in the famous Canticum Amatorium (ap. Augustin. c. Faust, iv. 5 sqq).

== Nag Hammadi texts ==
In On the Origin of the World, Sophia is depicted as the ultimate destroyer of this material universe, Yaldabaoth and all his Heavens:

She [Sophia] will cast them down into the abyss. They [the Archons] will be obliterated because of their wickedness. For they will come to be like volcanoes and consume one another until they perish at the hand of the prime parent. When he has destroyed them, he will turn against himself and destroy himself until he ceases to exist. And their heavens will fall one upon the next and their forces will be consumed by fire. Their eternal realms, too, will be overturned. And his heaven will fall and break in two. His [...] will fall down upon the [...] support them; they will fall into the abyss, and the abyss will be overturned. The light will [...] the darkness and obliterate it: it will be like something that never was.

== Jungian views ==
Carl Jung linked the figure of Sophia to the highest archetype of the anima in depth psychology. He identified Sophia as the ultimate personification of the anima, symbolizing wisdom and the integration of the unconscious with the conscious mind.

Jung's engagement with Gnostic texts, particularly the Pistis Sophia, influenced his understanding of the soul's transformative journey. He saw Sophia’s mythos as a psychological metaphor for the individuation process, where the anima must undergo trials before reaching wholeness. He also associated Sophia with the "eternal feminine" concept found in Goethe’s Faust, seeing her as a guiding force toward individuation and spiritual completeness.

Jung's interpretations influenced later Jungian scholars, such as Marie-Louise von Franz, who analyzed the role of Sophia-like figures in fairy tales, particularly those dealing with the rescue of the feminine principle.

== See also ==
- Asherah
- Binah
- Chokmah
- Descent of Inanna into the Underworld
- Holy Spirit
- Mary, mother of Jesus
- Ruha
- Yushamin
