= Valentinus (Gnostic) =

Egyptian gnostic theologian (c. 100–c. 165)

Valentinus (Greek: Οὐαλεντῖνος; c. 100 – c. 165 CE) was the best known and, for a time, most successful early Christian Gnostic theologian. He founded his school in Rome.

Valentinus produced a variety of writings, but only fragments survive, largely those quoted in rebuttal arguments in the works of his opponents, not enough to reconstruct his system except in broad outline. His doctrine is known only in the developed and modified form given to it by his disciples, the Valentinians. He taught that there were three kinds of people, the spiritual (pneumatics), psychical (psychics), and material (hylics); and that only those of a spiritual nature received the gnosis (knowledge) that allowed them to return to the divine Pleroma, while those of a psychic nature (ordinary Christians) would attain a lesser or uncertain form of salvation, and that those of a material nature were doomed to perish.

Valentinus had a large following, the Valentinians. It later divided into an Eastern and a Western, or Italian, branch. The Marcosians belonged to the Western branch.

== Biography ==
=== Education ===
Valentinus received a very good education, and was well read in Platonic, Biblical, Jewish, and Christian literature. Epiphanius of Salamis wrote (c. 390) that he learned through word of mouth (although he acknowledged that it was a disputed point) that Valentinus was "born a Phrebonite" in the coastal region of Egypt, and received his Greek education in Alexandria, an important and metropolitan early center of Christianity. The word "Phrebonite" is otherwise unknown, but probably refers to the ancient town of Phragonis, near present-day Tidah. In Alexandria, Valentinus may have heard the Gnostic philosopher Basilides and certainly became conversant with Hellenistic Middle Platonism and the culture of Hellenized Jews like the great Alexandrian Jewish allegorist and philosopher Philo.

Clement of Alexandria records that his followers said that Valentinus was a follower of Theudas, and that Theudas in turn was a follower of Paul the Apostle. Valentinus said that Theudas imparted to him the secret wisdom that Paul had taught privately to his inner circle, which Paul publicly referred to in connection with his visionary encounter with the risen Christ (Romans 16:25; 1 Corinthians 2:7; 2 Corinthians 12:2–4; Acts 9:9–10), when he received the secret teaching from him. Such esoteric teachings were downplayed in Rome after the mid-2nd century.

=== Teaching ===
Valentinus apparently taught first in Alexandria and went to Rome during the pontificate of Pope Hyginus (c. 138-142), and remained until the pontificate of Pope Anicetus, dying probably about 165. Most available details about his life are debated, as many of them are from his adversaries and of dubious reliability.

In Adversus Valentinianos, iv, Tertullian says Valentinus was a candidate for bishop before turning to heresy in a fit of pique, along with Marcion.

Valentinus had expected to become a bishop, because he was an able man both in genius and eloquence. Being indignant, however, that another obtained the dignity by reason of a claim which confessorship had given him, he broke with the church of the true faith. Just like those (restless) spirits which, when roused by ambition, are usually inflamed with the desire of revenge, he applied himself with all his might to exterminate the truth; and finding the clue of a certain old opinion, he marked out a path for himself with the subtlety of a serpent.

Few modern historians accept Tertullian's explanation, because Valentinus and his followers continued to consider themselves orthodox even as he developed his teachings. This suggests that opponents of Valentinus initiated the split between his teachings and orthodoxy. Epiphanius of Salamis wrote that Valentinus became a Gnostic after he had suffered a shipwreck in Cyprus and became insane. Epiphanius might have been influenced to believe this by the presence of Valentinian communities in Cyprus.

== Valentinianism ==
Valentinianism is the name for the school of gnostic philosophy tracing back to Valentinus. It was one of the major gnostic movements, having widespread following throughout the Roman Empire and provoking voluminous writings by Christian heresiologists. Notable Valentinians included Heracleon, Ptolemy, Florinus, Marcus and Axionicus of Antioch.

Valentinus professed to have derived his ideas from Theodas or Theudas, a disciple of Paul. Valentinus drew freely on some books of the New Testament. Unlike a great number of other gnostic systems, which are expressly dualist, Valentinus developed a system that was more monistic, albeit expressed in dualistic terms.

While Valentinus was alive, he made many disciples, and his system was the most widely diffused of all the forms of Gnosticism, although, as Tertullian remarked, it developed into several different versions, not all of which acknowledged their dependence on him ("they affect to disavow their name"). Among the more prominent disciples of Valentinus were Heracleon, Ptolemy, Marcus and possibly Bardaisan.

Many of the writings of these Gnostics, and a large number of excerpts from the writings of Valentinus, existed only in quotes displayed by their orthodox detractors, until 1945, when the cache of writings at Nag Hammadi revealed a Coptic version of the Gospel of Truth, which is the title of a text that, according to Irenaeus, was the same as the Gospel of Valentinus mentioned by Tertullian in his Against All Heresies.

=== Cosmology ===
Valentinian literature described the primal being, called Bythos, as the beginning of all things. After ages of silence and contemplation, Bythos gave rise to other beings by a process of emanation. The first series of beings, the aeons, were thirty in number, representing fifteen syzygies or pairs sexually complementary. Through the error of Sophia, one of the lowest aeons, and the ignorance of Saklas, the lower world with its subjection to matter is brought into existence. Man, the highest being in the lower world, as individuals exists in one of three states: pneumatic (spiritual), psychic (animate), or hylic (material) nature. The work of redemption consists in freeing those striving for higher states from servitude to the lower. This was the word and mission of Jesus and the Holy Spirit. Valentinus' Christology may have posited the existence of three redeeming beings, but Jesus while on Earth had a supernatural body which, for instance, "did not experience corruption" by defecating, according to Clement: there is also no mention of the account of Jesus's suffering in any Valentinian text. The Valentinian system was comprehensive, and it was worked out to cover all phases of thought and action.

Valentinus was among the early Christians who attempted to align Christianity with Platonism, drawing dualist conceptions from the Platonic world of ideal forms (pleroma) and the lower world of phenomena (kenoma). Of the mid-2nd century thinkers and preachers who were declared heretical by Irenaeus and later mainstream Christians, only Marcion of Sinope is as outstanding as a personality. The contemporary orthodox counter to Valentinus was Justin Martyr, though it was Irenaeus of Lyons who presented the most vigorous challenge to the Valentinians.

=== Trinity ===
Valentinus' name came up in the Arian disputes in the fourth century when Marcellus of Ancyra, a staunch opponent of Arianism, denounced the belief in God existing in three hypostases as heretical. Marcellus, who believed Father and Son to be one and the same, attacked his opponents by attempting to link them to Valentinus: In the fourth century, Marcellus declared that the idea of the Godhead existing as three hypostases (hidden spiritual realities) came from Plato through the teachings of Valentinus, who is quoted as teaching that God is three hypostases and three prosopa (persons) called the Father, the Son, and the Holy Spirit:

Now with the heresy of the Ariomaniacs, which has corrupted the Church of God... These then teach three hypostases, just as Valentinus the heresiarch first invented in the book entitled by him 'On the Three Natures'. For he was the first to invent three hypostases and three persons of the Father, Son and Holy Spirit, and he is discovered to have filched this from Hermes and Plato.

While this accusation is often sourced in stating Valentinus believed in a Triune Godhead, there is in fact no corroborating evidence that Valentinus ever taught these things. Irenaeus makes no mention of this in any of his five books against heresies, even though he deals with Valentinianism extensively in them. Rather, he indicates that Valentinus believed in the pre-existent Aeon known as Proarche, Propator, and Bythus who existed alongside Ennœa, and they together begot Monogenes and Aletheia: and these constituted the first-begotten Pythagorean Tetrad, from whom thirty Aeons were produced. Likewise, in the work cited by Marcellus, the three natures are said to have been the three natures of man, concerning which Irenaeus writes: "They conceive, then, of three kinds of men, spiritual, material, and animal, represented by Cain, Abel, and Seth. These three natures are no longer found in one person, but constitute various kinds [of men]. The material goes, as a matter of course, into corruption." According to Eusebius, Marcellus had a habit of mercilessly launching unsubstantiated attacks against his opponents, even those who had done him no wrong.

== Valentinus' detractors ==
Shortly after Valentinus' death, Irenaeus began his massive work On the Detection and Overthrow of the So-Called Gnosis (better known as Adversus Haereses) with a highly negative portrayal of Valentinus and his teachings, which occupies most of his first book. A modern student, M. T. Riley, observes that Tertullian's Adversus Valentinianos retranslated some passages from Irenaeus, without adding original material. Later, Epiphanius of Salamis discussed and dismissed him (Haer., XXXI). As with all the non-traditional early Christian writers, Valentinus has been known largely through quotations in the works of his detractors, though an Alexandrian follower also preserved some fragmentary sections as extended quotes. A Valentinian teacher Ptolemy refers to "apostolic tradition which we too have received by succession" in his Letter to Flora. Ptolemy is known only for this letter to a wealthy gnostic lady named Flora, a letter itself only known by its full inclusion in Epiphanius' Panarion. The letter describes the gnostic doctrine about the laws of Moses and their relation to the demiurge. The possibility should not be ignored that the letter was composed by Epiphanius, in the manner of composed speeches that ancient historians put into the mouths of their protagonists, as a succinct way to sum up.

== The Gospel of Truth ==
A new field in Valentinian studies opened when the Nag Hammadi library was discovered in Egypt in 1945. Among the varied collection of works classified as gnostic was a series of writings which could be associated with Valentinus, particularly the Coptic text called the Gospel of Truth which bears the same title reported by Irenaeus as belonging to a text by Valentinus. It is a declaration of the unknown name of Jesus's divine father, the possession of which enables the knower to penetrate the veil of ignorance that has separated all created beings from said father. It furthermore declares that Jesus has revealed that name through a variety of modes laden with a language of abstract elements.

This unknown name of the Father, mentioned in the Gospel of Truth, turns out to be not so mysterious. It is in fact stated in the text: "The name of the Father is the Child." Indeed, the overarching theme of the text is the revelation of the oneness of Christian believers with the "Father" through the "Son", leading to a new experience of life characterized by the words "fullness" and "rest". The text's primary claim is that "since need came into being because the Father was not known, when the Father is known, from that moment on, need will no longer exist." The tone is mystical and the language symbolic, reminiscent of the tone and themes found in the canonical Gospel of John. There are also very striking linguistic similarities with the early Christian songs known as the Odes of Solomon. It notably lacks the unusual names for deities, emanations, or angels found in many other of the Nag Hammadi texts. Its accessibility has led to a newfound popularity, evidenced by inclusion in such devotional compilations as A New New Testament.

== See also ==
- List of gospels
