= Pneumatic (Gnosticism) =

Order of humans in Gnosticism

The pneumatics ("spiritual", from Greek πνεῦμα, "spirit") were, in Gnosticism, the highest order of humans, the other two orders being psychics and hylics ("matter"). A pneumatic saw themselves as escaping the doom of the material world via the transcendent knowledge of Sophia's Divine Spark from inner revelation coming from the highest point of the subtle "nous" in the head or crown region.

They conceive, then, of three kinds of men, spiritual, material, and animal . . . The material goes, as a matter of course, into corruption. The animal, if it make choice of the better part, finds repose in the intermediate place; but if the worse, it too shall pass into destruction. But they assert that the spiritual principles which have been sown by Achamoth, being disciplined and nourished here from that time until now in righteous souls (because when given forth by her they were yet but weak), at last attaining to perfection, shall be given as brides to the angels of the Saviour, while their animal souls of necessity rest for ever with the Demiurge in the intermediate place. And again subdividing the animal souls themselves, they say that some are by nature good, and others by nature evil. The good are those who become capable of receiving the [spiritual] seed [and becoming pneumatic]; the evil by nature are those who are never able to receive that seed [and become hylic].

— Irenaeus, Adv. Haer. I. 7, 5

In the New Testament a contrast is made between the psychikoi and the pneumatikoi, in the former of whom the mere animal soul predominates, the latter exhibiting the working of a higher spiritual nature (Jude 19; 1 Cor. 2:14–15; compare also 15:44–46). In the Valentinian system this contrast is sharpened, and is made to depend on an original difference of nature between the two classes of men, a mythical theory being devised which professed to account for the origin of the different elements in men's nature; the psychic element being something higher and better than the mere material element, but immeasurably inferior to the pneumatic. It may well be believed that in the language of the Gnostic sects, the "pneumatici" are "spiritual men who have attained to the perfect knowledge of God, and been initiated into these mysteries by Achamoth" herself (Adv. Haer. I. 6, 1), ordinary Christians being branded as "psychici."

Such was also the use made of the latter word by Tertullian, who in his latest works, written after his Montanism had involved him in complete separation from the church, habitually uses the word Psychici to designate those from whom he had separated.

== Descriptive term in religious studies ==
In the academic study of religion and mysticism more generally, pneumatic has been used as a classification term to define similar trends in wider contexts. For example, Joseph G. Weiss describes "A Circle of Pneumatics in Pre-Hasidism", in the context of Jewish mysticism. Here the pneumatic group have minor prophetic powers ("Ruach Ha-qodesh" or "Ruach HaKodesh" (etc.) in Jewish parlance), such as revealing the sins of their fellows. However they decide to renounce use of this, probably in response to communal suspicion in the wake of the Sabbatean Kabbalistic heresy. The Baal Shem Tov, founder of Hasidism, seeks recognition in the group, but is initially hindered by his lower status as a Baal Shem exorcist.

== See also ==
- Id, ego and super-ego
