= Letter to Flora =

Gnostic text written by Ptolemy

The "Letter to Flora" is a Gnostic text written by Ptolemy, a Valentinian teacher, to a woman named Flora.

Prior to the discovery of the Nag Hammadi Library, the Letter was one of the few authentic Gnostic works available to scholars. The letter was included in full in Epiphanius's Panarion, an unsympathetic text which condemns its theology as heretical. Ptolemy's beliefs are also known from the writings of Irenaeus.

== Content ==
The Letter to Flora relates the Gnostic view of the Law of Moses, a rational explication of the proposition that "the whole Law is divided into three parts; we find in it the legislation of Moses, of the elders, and of God himself".

the entire Law contained in the Pentateuch of Moses was not ordained by one legislator—I mean, not by God alone: some commandments are Moses', and some were given by other men.... The first part must be attributed to God alone, and his legislation; the second to Moses—not in the sense that God legislates through him, but in the sense that Moses gave some legislation under the influence of his own ideas; and the third to the elders of the people, who seem to have ordained some commandments of their own at the beginning.

The author of the Letter assumes that the Christian Savior was sent, not to destroy the Law, but to complete it. He divides the Law among three types: the pure legislation of God embodied in the Decalogue, the mixed legislation "laid down for vengeance" affected by the world-situation of its first hearers (the world being inherently evil to a Gnostic), and:

finally, there is the allegorical (exemplary) part, ordained in the image of the spiritual and transcendent matters, I mean the part dealing with offerings and circumcision and the sabbath and fasting and Passover and unleavened bread and other similar matters.

Though making points of a decidedly dualistic nature, Ptolemy supports his readings from "sayings" texts or logia: "We shall draw the proofs of what we say from the words of the Savior, which alone can lead us without error to the comprehension of reality." He quotes sayings of Jesus that can also be found in the gospels of Matthew and of John, and he quotes Paul.

Ptolemy states in the letter that, "For if the Law was not ordained by the perfect God himself, as we have already taught you, nor by the Devil, a statement one cannot possibly make, the legislator must be someone other than these two. In fact, he is the Demiurge and maker of this universe and everything in it". This excerpt reflects Ptolemy's gnostic view that the god that created the world is not the Perfect God, but rather an inferior god who incorrectly believed that he was the one true God, which is what he is trying to convey to Flora.

Historian Paula Fredriksen writes that the letter indicates several things at once. First, that the Valentinian Christians engaged with Jewish scripture. Second, that they too appealed to apostolic succession as a source of authority. Third, that the God of Israel was understood in Valentinian theology as a middle figure: a god of justice who was neither the supreme Father nor the devil, but a lower deity.

== Literary form ==
Such a publicly circulated Epistle may have been a literary form, rather than an actual missive sent by a "Ptolemy" to a "Flora". The Letter was the classical equivalent of the Renaissance and modern Essay format. The attack on Ptolemy by Irenaeus does not eliminate the possibility that the present letter ascribed to him was composed by Epiphanius, in the manner of composed speeches that ancient historians put into the mouths of their protagonists, as a succinct way to sum up the Gnostic views he was intent on demolishing.
