= Adversus Valentinianos =

Refutation of Valentinianism by Tertullian

Adversus Valentinianos, or Against the Valentinians, is a famous refutation of Valentinianism by Tertullian, an orthodox contemporary of the Gnostics and one of the first to investigate them. The work satirized the bizarre elements that appear in Gnostic mythology, ridiculing the Gnostics for creating elaborate cosmologies, with multi-storied heavens like apartment houses.

Though an enemy of Valentinus, Tertullian nevertheless spoke of him as a brilliant and eloquent man. Tertullian claims that Valentinus refused to submit himself to the superior authority of the bishop of Rome because he wanted to become bishop himself. In Tertullian's version of events, when another man was chosen to be bishop, Valentinus was filled with envy and frustrated ambition and separated himself from the church to found a rival group of his own. Tertullian's story follows a typical polemic against heresy, maintaining that envy and ambition lead heretics to deviate from the true faith, and for this and other reasons is largely rejected by historians. Twenty years after the incident which Tertullian claims led to their separation from it, followers of Valentinus still considered themselves full members of the church, and they resisted orthodox attempts to expel them.

The religious historian Elaine Pagels writes that though Tertullian's story may be untrue, it illustrates the potential of heresy to encourage insubordination to clerical authority, which Christians saw as one of its dangers.
