= Ptolemy (Gnostic) =

2nd century Christian Gnostic

Ptolemy the Gnostic, (Greek: Πτολεμαίος ο Γνωστικός Latin: Ptolemaeus Gnosticus) was a disciple of the Gnostic teacher Valentinius and is known for the Letter to Flora, an epistle he wrote to a wealthy woman named Flora, herself not a Gnostic.

== Biography ==
Ptolemy was probably still alive c. 180. No other certain details are known about his life; Harnack's suggestion that he was identical with the Ptolemy spoken of by Justin Martyr is as yet unproved. It is not known when Ptolemy became a disciple of Valentinius, but Valentinius was active in the Egyptian city of Alexandria and in Rome. Ptolemy was, with Heracleon, the principal writer of the Italian or Western school of Valentinian Gnosticism, which was active in Italy and Southern Gaul.

== Works ==
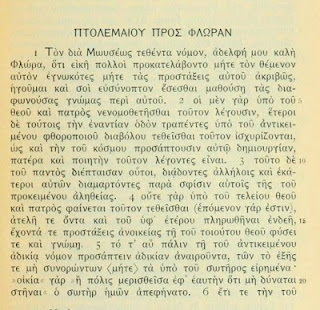
Epistle to Flora

Ptolemy's works have reached us in an incomplete form in a fragment of an exegetical writing preserved by Irenæus; as well as an epistle to Flora, a Christian lady not otherwise known to us.

The epistle was found in the works of Epiphanius. It was written in response to Flora's inquiry concerning the origin of the Ten Commandments contained in the Old Testament. Those laws, Ptolemy states, cannot be attributed to the Supreme God, nor to the devil; indeed, the set of laws does not even proceed from a single law-giver. A part of it is the work of an inferior god, analogous to the gnostic demiurge; the second part is attributable to Moses, and the third part to the elders of the Jewish people.

This demiurge occupies a middle position between the Supreme God and the devil, and is the creator of the material universe; he is neither perfect nor the author of evil, but ought to be called 'just' and benevolent to the extent of his abilities. In his cosmogonic depiction of the universe, Ptolemy referred also to an extensive system of aeons that emanated from a monadic spiritual source. Thirty of these, he believed, ruled the higher world, the pleroma. This system became the basis of an exegesis which expounds the first Ogdoad of the Pleroma based on the prologue of John's gospel.

In addition, Ptolemy subdivides the part of the Decalogue ascribed to the inferior god into three further sections:

- The absolutely pure legislation of the Decalogue which was not destroyed but fulfilled by the Saviour.
- The laws mixed with evil, including the right of retaliation, which were abolished by the Saviour because they were incompatible with His nature.
- The section which is typical and symbolical of the higher world. This part of the Decalogue includes such precepts as circumcision and fasting and was raised by the saviour from a sensible to a spiritual plane.
