= Marcus (Marcosian) =

Founder of the Marcosian Gnostic sect

Marcus also sometimes known as Marcus The Magician or Marcus The Gnostic, was the founder of the Marcosian Gnostic sect in the 2nd century AD. He was a disciple of Valentinus, with whom his system mainly agreed. His doctrines are almost exclusively known through a long polemic (i. 13–21) in Adversus Haereses, in which Irenaeus gives an account of his teaching and his school. Clement of Alexandria clearly knew of Marcus and actually used his system of mystical numbers (four, six, eight, ten, twelve, thirty), though without acknowledgement. (Note: In Stromata, VI, xvi.)

== Life ==
Marcus appears to have been an elder contemporary of Irenaeus, who speaks of him as though still living and teaching. Irenaeus writes that the Rhone district was a home to the followers of Marcus, but appears to know Marcus himself only by his writings.

The location where Marcus lived is uncertain. Given accounts of Marcus having seduced the wife of one of the deacons in Asia, and the use of Hebrew or Syriac names in the Marcosian school, the Catholic Encyclopedia speculates that Marcus must have lived in Asia Minor. On the other hand, Jerome identifies Marcus with the Marcus of Memphis who appears in the writings of Sulpicius Severus on Priscillianism.

== Teachings ==
His system tells of 30 Aeons, divided into an Ogdoad, a Decad, and a Dodecad; of the fall and recovery of Sophia; of the future union of the spirits of the chosen seed with angels as their heavenly bridegrooms. What Marcus added to the teaching of his predecessors was a system of Isopsephy similar to that of the later Pythagoreans, about mysteries in numbers and names. Marcus found in Scripture and in Nature repeated examples of the occurrence of his mystical numbers, four, six, eight, ten, twelve, thirty.

== Accusations ==
Irenaeus alleges that Marcus abused his influence over "silly women" in order to gain both money and sexual favors. He is accused of having used philtres (erotic control potions) and love charms, and at least one, if not more, of his female disciples on returning to Catholicism claimed to have had sexual relations with him. However, it seems that most of his followers claimed to have been elevated by their knowledge and the redemption they had experienced.

== See also ==
- Colarbasians
- Valentinianism
