= Theudas (teacher of Valentinus) =

1st century Christian Gnostic thinker

Theudas was the name of a Christian Gnostic thinker, who was said to be a disciple of the Apostles. He went on to teach Valentinus (Gnostic). The source of this connection is the testimony of Valentinius' followers, and Clement of Alexandria.

The First Apocalypse of James which could be considered an oral tradition, dating from 3rd century AD, describes a post-resurrection revelation in which Jesus privately instructs James the Just, presenting him as a uniquely authorized bearer of a hidden knowledge necessary for a mystical ascension. Within this text, Theudas is mentioned as a trusted recipient and transmitter of these secret teachings, entrusted by James to preserve and pass them on discreetly to those deemed worthy.

James, who according to Josephus was executed around 62 CE, is traditionally understood to have been born near the turn of the era, making him approximately 60–65 years old at the time of his death. In the narrative logic of the Apocalypse of James, Theudas appears as a younger disciple, positioned not as a peer but as a successor—someone who receives instruction from James and is expected to carry it forward after James’ departure.

If Theudas were, hypothetically, 30 years old around 60 CE, he would have been born circa 30 CE. On this model, Theudas could plausibly have lived into the early 2nd century. By 120–130 CE, he would have been in his 90s, an advanced age but not inconceivable for a revered teacher in antiquity, especially one remembered primarily as a custodian of esoteric tradition rather than a public leader.

Valentinus, who was likely born around 100 CE and became active as a teacher between 130–160 CE, is reported by Clement of Alexandria to have claimed instruction from a figure named Theudas, whom they identify as a hearer of the Secret Wisdom of Paul the Apostle which he gave to the spiritually mature. If these reports preserve a genuine memory rather than a purely symbolic lineage, then Valentinus could have encountered Theudas when Valentinus was a young adult (20–30 years old) and Theudas an elder nearing the end of his life, functioning as a final link in an apostolic chain.

In this reconstruction, Theudas would stand as an esoteric bridge figure, connecting:

James, who in multiple non-canonical traditions is portrayed as the authoritative Jerusalem leader entrusted with secret teaching,

Paul, whose letters Valentinus later interpreted as containing hidden wisdom for the mature,

And Valentinus himself, who systematized these traditions into a coherent theological vision.

Notably, Theudas is otherwise absent from independent historical records. Outside of heresiological reports and the First Apocalypse of James, he leaves no trace in canonical, epigraphic, or narrative sources. As a result, the Apocalypse of James functions as primary literary evidence for Theudas’ role within a James-centered transmission of secret teaching. The text thereby serves to legitimate a lineage in which James is portrayed as receiving direct instruction from the risen Jesus—a motif that resonates with other early traditions emphasizing hidden sayings and private instruction, such as the Gospel of Thomas, where James is identified as the one for whom heaven and earth came into being (Logion 12), though not explicitly as a recipient of revelation within that text.

Taken together, these sources suggest that “Theudas” is best understood not simply as a biographical individual but as a remembered bearer of authority, whose significance lies in his function as a transmitter of concealed wisdom. Whether a single exceptionally long-lived person or a lineage figure whose name came to represent continuity, Theudas occupies a crucial role in establishing the legitimacy of Valentinian teaching by anchoring it to James, Paul, and ultimately to Jesus himself through esoteric revelation.
