= Marcosians =

Gnostic sect founded by Marcus

The Marcosians were a Gnostic sect founded by Marcus in Lyon, France, and active in southern Europe from the second to the fourth century.

Women held special status in the Marcosian communities; they were regarded as prophetesses and participated in administering the Eucharistic rites. Irenaeus accused Marcus of seducing his followers and scornfully writes (Adversus Haereses I. 13, 4) that the whole sect was an affair of "silly women".

The Marcosian system was a variation of Valentinus's: it retained the 30 Aeons, but it called them "Greatnesses" and gave them numerical values. It kept the myth of the fall of Sophia but called it a "Divine Deficiency". Unique to it was the adaptation of the Pythagorean number theory (isopsephy) to Gnosticism.

== System ==
Marcus held his knowledge to be the product of a divine revelation of the body of the Anthropos:

The infinitely exalted Tetrad descended upon him from the invisible and indescribable places in the form of a woman . . . and expounded to him alone its own nature, and the origin of all things, which it had never before revealed to any one either of gods or men. . . . [and] said:—I wish to show thee Aletheia (Truth) herself; for I have brought her down from the dwellings above, that thou mayest see her without a veil, and understand her beauty—that thou mayest also hear her speaking, and admire her wisdom. Behold, then, her head on high, Alpha and Omega; her neck, Beta and Psi; her shoulders with her hands, Gamma and Chi; her breast, Delta and Phi; her diaphragm, Epsilon and Upsilon; her back, Zeta and Tau; her belly, Eta and Sigma; her thighs, Theta and Rho; her knees, Iota and Pi; her legs, Kappa and Omicron; her ankles, Lambda and Xi; her feet, Mu and Nu. Such is the body of Truth, according to this magician, such the figure of the element, such the character of the letter. And he calls this element Anthropos (Man), and says that is the fountain of all speech, and the beginning of all sound, and the expression of all that is unspeakable, and the mouth of the silent Sige.

— I. 14, 1-3

=== Episemon ===
In the account of his system given by Irenaeus (I. xiv.), copied by Hippolytus (Ref. vi. 45) and by Epiphanius (Haer. 34), τὸ ἐπίσημον is repeatedly used to denote the numerical character for six; the number 6 is ὁ ἐπίσημος ἀριθμός; the six-lettered name Ἰησοῦς is τὸ ἐπίσημον ὄνομα, etc., language perplexing to the old Latin translator, who renders the word by "insignis." Eusebius (Quaest. ad Marin. Mai, Nov. Pat. Bib. iv. 299), copied by Jerome or Pseudo-Jerome (Brev. in Psal. 77, vii. 198, ed. Vallars.), suggested, as a way of reconciling the difference between the evangelists as to whether the Lord suffered at the third or the sixth hour, that a transcriber's error may have arisen from the likeness of Gamma and the Episemon, i.e. apparently Γ and Ϝ.

The source from which all modern writers have learned their use of the word episemon is Joseph Justus Scaliger's essay on the origin of the Ionic letters. He quoted from Bede, de Indigitatione, a statement of an old grammarian, who mentioned that the Greeks denote numbers by letters and for this purpose join to the letters of their alphabet three other characters:

Prima est ς quae dicitur Episimon et est nota numeri VI.; secunda est G quae vocatur kophe et valet in numero XC.; tertia est ϡ quae dicitur enneacosia quia valent DCCCC.

The true account of these three characters seems to be that though the Phoenicians themselves did not use the letters of their alphabet for purposes of numeration, the Greeks, who derived their alphabet from them, did so in the 5th century BC; that their alphabet then still contained two of the Phoenician letters which in the next century were disused, viz., βαῦ in the sixth place, and κόππα, the Roman Q, coming after π; that these letters then took their natural place in the system of numeration, which was afterwards made complete by the addition, at the end of the letters of the alphabet, of another character to denote 900, which from its shape was at a considerably later period called σανπῖ.

=== Six ===
With regard to the properties of the number six, Marcus and Clement were in part indebted to Philo of Alexandria, who explained (De Op. Mund. 3) that it is the first perfect number, i.e., according to Euclid's definition, one equal to the sum of the numbers 1, 2, 3, which divide it without remainder (Aug. de Civ. Dei, xi. 30), the second such number being 28, which is the sum of its divisors 1, 2, 4, 7, 14 (Orig. t. 28 in S. Joann.); that being 2 × 3 it arises from the marriage of a male and female, i.e., odd and even number; that there are six directions of motion, forward, backward, right, left, up, down; etc. Marcus observed that

- the world was made in six days
- in the new dispensation Jesus after six days went up to the Mount of Transfiguration
- by the appearance of Moses and Elijah, the number of His company became six
- he suffered at the sixth hour of the sixth day of the week

and concludes that this number has the power not only of production, but of regeneration. As seven is the number of the heavens, and eight is the supercelestial ogdoad, so six denotes the material creation (see also Heracleon); and, in particular, the material body through which the Saviour revealed Himself to men's senses, and conveyed to them that enlightenment of their ignorance in which redemption consisted. Clement, if not Marcus, finds the Saviour's higher nature represented by the episemon, which is not taken into account by one who looks merely at the order of the letters in the alphabet, but reveals itself in the system of numeration.

Irenaeus points out that the mysteries of Marcus all depend on the employment of the modern form of the Greek alphabet, and that they disappear when a Semitic alphabet is used. He shows also (ii. 24) that it is possible to say as fine things about the properties of the number 5 as about those of the numbers which are glorified by Marcus.

== Practices ==
=== Baptism and Baptismal Formula ===
They wrote that they baptised people in the name of the Blessed Holy Spirit of the Holy Trinity with Blessed Holy Water of the mother's womb. Merging her children with All that is holy and divine for eternity. From the mother of all things, into life to Holy ascension.

== See also ==
- Marcus (Marcosian)
- Colarbasians
- Valentinus
