= Heracleon =

2nd century Greek Gnostic

Heracleon was a Gnostic who flourished about AD 175, probably in the south of Italy. He is the author of the earliest known commentary on a book that would eventually be included in the Christian New Testament with his commentary on the Gospel of John, although only fragmentary quotes survive. He is described by Clement of Alexandria (Strom. 4.9) as the most esteemed (δοκιμώτατος) of the school of Valentinus; and, according to Origen (Comm. in S. Joann. t. ii. § 8, Opp. t. iv. p. 66), said to have been in personal contact (γνώριμος) with Valentinus himself. He is barely mentioned by Irenaeus (2.4.1) and by Tertullian (adv. Valent. 4). The common source of Philaster and Pseudo-Tertullian (i.e. probably the earlier treatise of Hippolytus) contained an article on Heracleon between those on Ptolemaeus and Secundus, and on Marcus and Colarbasus.

In his system he appears to have regarded the divine nature as a vast abyss in whose Pleroma were Aeons of different orders and/or degrees, emanations from the source of being. Midway between the supreme God and the material world was the Demiurge, who created the latter, and under whose jurisdiction the lower, animal soul of man proceeded after death, while his higher, celestial soul returned to the Pleroma whence at first it issued.

He seems to have received the ordinary Christian scriptures; and Origen, who treats him as a notable exegete, has preserved fragments of Heracleon's commentary on the Gospel of John, while Clement of Alexandria quotes from him what appears to be a passage from a commentary on the Gospel of Luke. These writings have intensely mystical and allegorical interpretations of the text.

== Life ==
Neander and Cave have suggested Alexandria as the place where Heracleon taught; but Clement's language suggests some distance either of time or of place; for he would scarcely have thought it necessary to explain that Heracleon was the most in repute of the Valentinians if he were at the time the head of a rival school in the same city. Hippolytus makes Heracleon one of the Italian school of Valentinians; but the silence of all the authorities makes it unlikely that he taught at Rome. It seems, therefore, most likely that he taught in one of the cities of S. Italy; or Praedestinatus may be right in making Sicily the scene of his inventions about Heracleon.

The date of Heracleon is of interest on account of his use of St. John's Gospel, which clearly had attained high authority when he wrote. The mere fact, however, that a book was held in equal honour by the Valentinians and the orthodox seems to prove that it must have attained its position before the separation of the Valentinians from the church; and, if so, it is of less importance to determine the exact date of Heracleon. The decade 170–180 may probably be fixed for the centre of his activity. This would not be inconsistent with his having been personally instructed by Valentinus, who continued to teach as late as 160, and would allow time for Heracleon to have gained celebrity before Clement wrote, one of whose references to Heracleon is in what was probably one of his earliest works. He had evidently long passed from the scene when Origen wrote.

== Commentary ==
The chief interest that now attaches to Heracleon is that he is the earliest commentator on the N.T. of whom we have knowledge. Origen, in the still extant portion of his commentary on St. John, quotes Heracleon nearly 50 times, usually controverting, occasionally accepting his expositions. We thus recover large sections of Heracleon's commentary on cc. i. ii. iv. and viii. of St. John. There is reason to think that he wrote commentaries on St. Luke also. Clement of Alexandria (Strom. iv. 9) expressly quotes from Heracleon's exposition of Luke 12:8; and another reference (25 Eclog. ex Script. Proph. p. 995) is in connexion with Luke 3:16–17, and so probably from an exposition of these verses.

=== Martyrdom ===
The first passage quoted by Clement bears on an accusation brought against some of the Gnostic sects, that they taught that it was no sin to avoid martyrdom by denying the faith. No exception can be taken to what Heracleon says on this subject.

Men mistake in thinking that the only confession is that made with the voice before the magistrates; there is another confession made in the life and conversation, by faith and works corresponding to the faith. The first confession may be made by a hypocrite: and it is one not required of all; there are many who have never been called on to make it, as for instance Matthew, Philip, Thomas, Levi [Lebbaeus]; the other confession must be made by all. He who has first confessed in his disposition of heart will confess with the voice also when need shall arise and reason require. Well did Christ use concerning confession the phrase 'in Me' (ἐὰν ὁμολογήσῃ ἐν ἐμοί), concerning denial the phrase 'Me.' A man may confess 'Him' with the voice who really denies Him, if he does not confess Him also in action; but those only confess 'in Him' who live in the confession and in corresponding actions. Nay, it is He Whom they embrace and Who dwells in them Who makes confession 'in them'; for 'He cannot deny Himself.' But concerning denial, He did not say whosoever shall deny 'in Me,' but whosoever shall deny 'Me'; for no one that is 'in Him' can deny Him. And the words 'before men' do not mean before unbelievers only, but before Christians and unbelievers alike; before the one by their life and conversation, before the others in words.

=== Exposition ===
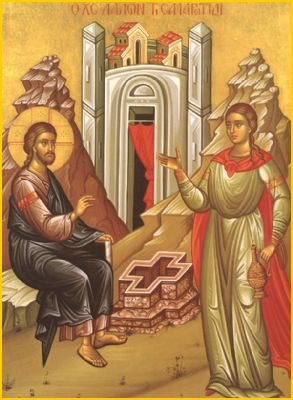
Orthodox icon of Photina, the Samaritan woman, meeting Jesus by the well.

In this exposition every word in the sacred text assumes significance; and this characteristic runs equally through the fragments of Heracleon's commentary on St. John, whether the words commented on be Jesus's own or only those of the Evangelist. Thus he calls attention to the facts that in the statement "all things were made by Him," the preposition used is διά; that Jesus is said to have gone down to Capernaum and gone up to Jerusalem; that He found the buyers and sellers ἐν τῷ ἱερῷ, not ἐν τῷ ναῷ; that He said salvation is of the Jews not in them, and again (John 4:40) that Jesus tarried with the Samaritans, not in them; notice is taken of the point in Jesus's discourse with the woman of Samaria, where He first emphasizes His assertion with "Woman, believe Me"; and though Origen occasionally accuses Heracleon of deficient accuracy, for instance in taking the prophet (John 1:21) as meaning no more than a prophet; "in three days" (John 2:19) as meaning no more than "on the third day"; yet on the whole Heracleon's examination of the words is exceedingly minute. He attempts to reconcile differences between the Evangelists, e.g. Jesus's ascription to the Baptist of the titles "Elias" and "prophet" with John's own disclaimer of these titles. He finds mysteries in the numbers in the narrative—in the 46 years which the temple was in building, the 6 husbands of the woman of Samaria (for such was his reading), the 2 days Jesus abode with the people of the city, the 7th hour at which the nobleman's son was healed.

He thinks it necessary to reconcile his own doctrine with that of the sacred writer, even at the cost of some violence of interpretation. Thus he declares that the Evangelist's assertion that all things were made by the Logos must be understood only of the things of the visible creation, his own doctrine being that the higher aeon world was not so made, but that the lower creation was made by the Logos through the instrumentality of the Demiurge.

=== Valentinianism ===
He strives to find Valentinianism in the Gospel by a method of spiritual interpretation. Thus the nobleman (βασιλικός, John 4:47) is the Demiurge, a petty prince, his kingdom being limited and temporary, the servants are his angels, the son is the man who belongs to the Demiurge. As he finds the ψυχικοί represented in the nobleman's son, so again he finds the πνευματικοί in the woman of Samaria. The water of Jacob's well which she rejected is Judaism; the husband whom she is to call is no earthly husband, but her spiritual bridegroom from the Pleroma; the other husbands with whom she previously had committed fornication represent the matter with which the spiritual have been entangled; that she is no longer to worship either in "this mountain" or in "Jerusalem" means that she is not, like the heathen, to worship the visible creation, the Hyle, or kingdom of the devil, nor like the Jews to worship the creator or Demiurge; her watering-pot is her good disposition for receiving life from the Saviour.

Heracleon's method is one commonly used by orthodox Fathers, especially by Origen. Origen even occasionally blames Heracleon for being too easily content with more obvious interpretations. Heracleon at first is satisfied to take "whose shoe latchet I am not worthy to loose" as meaning no more than "for whom I am not worthy to perform menial offices," and he has Origen's approbation when he tries, however unsuccessfully, to investigate what the shoe represented. It does not appear that Heracleon used his method of interpretation controversially to establish Valentinian doctrine, but, being a Valentinian, readily found those doctrines indicated in the passages on which he commented.

=== The devil ===
One other of his interpretations deserves mention. The meaning which the Greek of John 8:44 most naturally conveys is that of the pre-Hieronymian translation "You are from the father of the Devil," and so it is generally understood by Greek Fathers, though in various ways they escape attributing a father to the devil. Hilgenfeld, Volkmar, and DeConick consider that the Evangelist shows that he embraced the opinion of the Valentinians and some earlier Gnostic sects that the father of the devil was the Demiurge or God of the Jews. But this idea was unknown to Heracleon, who here interprets the father of the devil as his essentially evil nature; to which Origen objects that if the devil be evil by the necessity of his nature, he ought rather to be pitied than blamed.

=== Redemption ===
To judge from the fragments we have, Heracleon's bent was rather practical than speculative. He says nothing of the Gnostic theories as to stages in the origin of the universe; the prologue of St. John does not tempt him into mention of the Valentinian Aeonology. In fact he does not use the word aeon in the sense employed by other Valentinian writers, but rather where according to their use we should expect the word Pleroma; and this last word he uses in a special sense, describing the spiritual husband of the Samaritan woman as her Pleroma—that is, the complement which supplies what was lacking to perfection. We find in his system only two beings unknown to orthodox theology, the Demiurge, and apparently a second Son of Man; for on John 4:37 he distinguishes a higher Son of Man who sows from the Saviour Who reaps. Heracleon gives as great prominence as any orthodox writer to Christ and His redeeming work. But all mankind are not alike in a condition to profit by His redemption. There is a threefold order of creatures:

1. The Hylic or material, formed of the ὕλη, which is the substance of the devil, incapable of immortality.
2. The psychic or animal belonging to the kingdom of the Demiurge; their ψυχή is naturally mortal, but capable of being clothed with immortality, and it depends on their disposition (θέσις) whether they become sons of God or children of the devil.
3. The pneumatic or spiritual, who are by nature of the divine essence, though entangled with matter and needing redemption to be delivered from it.

These are the special creation of the Logos; they live in Him, and become one with Him. In the second class Heracleon seems to have had the Jews specially in mind and to have regarded them with a good deal of tenderness. They are the children of Abraham who, if they do not love God, at least do not hate Him. Their king, the Demiurge, is represented as not hostile to the Supreme, and though shortsighted and ignorant, yet as well disposed to faith and ready to implore the Saviour's help for his subjects whom he had not himself been able to deliver. When his ignorance is removed, he and his redeemed subjects will enjoy immortality in a place raised above the material world.

Besides the passages on which he comments Heracleon refers to Genesis 6; Isaiah 1:2; Matthew 8:2, Matthew 9:37; Matthew 18:11; Romans 1:25, Romans 12:1; 1 Corinthians 15:54; 2 Timothy 2:13.

== Bibliography ==
- Brooke, A. E., ed. (2004). The Fragments of Heracleon: Newly Edited from the Mss. with An Introduction and Notes. Piscataway, N.J.: Gorgias Press.
- DeConick, April (2013), "Who is Hiding in the Gospel of John? Reconceptualizing Johannine Theology and the Roots of Gnosticism" (PDF), in Adamson, Grant; DeConick, April (eds.), Histories of the Hidden God: Concealment and Revelation in Western Gnostic, Esoteric, and Mystical Traditions, pp. 13–29.
- Heinrici, Val. Gnosis, 127.
- Neander, Gen. Entwick. 143, and Ch. Hist. ii. 135.
- Pagels, Elaine (1973). The Johannine Gospel in Gnostic Exegesis: Heracleon's Commentary on John. Nashville: Abingdon Press.
- Westcott, N. T. Canon. 299.
