= Pleroma =

Religious concept

Pleroma (Koine Greek: πλήρωμα, literally "fullness") generally refers to the totality of divine powers. It is used in Christian theological contexts, as well as in Gnosticism. The term also appears in the Epistle to the Colossians, which is traditionally attributed to Paul the Apostle. The word is used 17 times in the New Testament. In Valentinianism it represents as virtualities of the Son.

== Etymology ==
The word literally means "fullness", from the verb plēróō (πληρόω, "to fill"), from plḗrēs (πλήρης, "full").

== Christianity ==
=== New Testament ===
The word itself is a relative term, capable of many shades of meaning, according to the subject with which it is joined and the antithesis to which it is contrasted. It denotes the result of the action of the verb pleroun; but pleroun is either

- to fill up an empty thing (e.g. Matthew 13:48), or
- to complete an incomplete thing (e.g. Matthew 5:17);

and the verbal substantive in -ma may express either

1. the objective accusative after the verb, 'the thing filled or completed,' or
2. the cognate accusative, 'the state of fullness or completion, the fulfilment, the full amount,' resulting from the action of the verb (Romans 11:12, 13:10, 15:29, 1 Corinthians 10:26).

It may emphasise totality in contrast to its constituent parts; or fullness in contrast to emptiness (kenoma); or completeness in contrast to incompleteness or deficiency (hysterema Colossians 1:24, 2 Corinthians 11:9; hettema Romans 11:12).

A further ambiguity arises when it is joined with a genitive, which may be either subjective or objective, the fullness which one thing gives to another, or that which it receives from another.

In its semi-technical application it is applied primarily to the perfection of God, the fullness of His Being, 'the aggregate of the Divine attributes, virtues, energies': this is used quite absolutely in Colossians 1:19 (oti en auto eudokesen pan to pleroma katoikesai), but further defined

1. as pan to pleroma tes theotetos, 'the whole completeness of the Divine nature,' in Colossians 2:9,
2. as pan to pleroma tou theou, 'the whole (moral) perfection which is characteristic of God,' in Ephesians 3:19.

Secondarily, this same pleroma is transferred to Christ; it was embodied permanently in Him at the Incarnation (Colossians 1:19); it still dwells permanently in His glorified Body, en auto katoikei somatikos (Colossians 2:9); it is tou pleromatos tou christou (Ephesians 4:13), the complete, moral, and intellectual perfection to which Christians aspire and with which they are filled (Ephesians 4:13, Colossians 2:10 este en auto pepleromenoi. Cf. John 1:16 oti ek tou pleromatos autou emeis pantes elabomen, where pleroma is the state of Him who is pleres charitos kai aletheias, John 1:14, cf. Luke 2:40 pleroumenon sophia). This indwelling emphasizes the completeness with which the Son represents the Father; it is the fullness of life which makes Him the representative, without other intermediary agencies, and ruler of the whole universe; and it is the fullness of moral and intellectual perfection which is communicable through Him to man; it is consistent with a gradual growth of human faculties (Luke 2:40), therefore with the phrase eauton ekenosen of Philippians 2:7, which is perhaps intended as a deliberate contrast to it. One further application of the phrase is made in (Ephesians 1:23), where it is used of the Church, to pleroma tou ta panta en pasin pleroumenou. Here the genitive is perhaps subjective—the fullness of Christ, His full embodiment, that fullness which He supplies to the Church—emphasizing the thoroughness with which the Church is the receptacle of His powers and represents Him on earth. The analogy of the other uses of the word with the genitive of the person (Ephesians 3:19, 4:13), and the stress throughout these books on Christians being filled by Christ (Ephesians 3:19, 4:13, 5:18, Colossians 1:9, 2:10, 4:12, John 1:16, 3:34), favours this view. But the genitive may be objective, 'the complement of Christ,' that which completes Him, which fills up by its activities the work which His withdrawal to heaven would have left undone, as the body completes the head. The analogy of the body, the stress laid on the action of the Church (Ephesians 3:10–21), the language about Paul himself in Colossians 1:24 (antanaplero ta hysteremata ton thlipseon tou christou), support this, and it is impossible to decide between the two. The former view has been most common since the thorough examination of the word by Fritzsche and Lightfoot, and was taken by von Soden. But the latter view, which was that of Origen and Chrysostom, has been strongly advocated by Pfleiderer, and T. K. Abbott.

Outside the NT the word occurs in Ignatius in a sense which is clearly influenced by the NT, and apparently in the meaning of the Divine fullness, as going forth and blessing and residing in the Church (Eph. Inscr. te eulogemen en megethei theou patros pleromati, and Trall. Inscr. en kai aspazomai en to pleromati, almost = en Christo).

=== Gnosticism ===
In Gnosticism the use becomes more technical, though its applications are still very variable. The Gnostic writers appeal to the use in the New Testament (evidenced in Irenaeus' account of their views and his corresponding refutation, Iren I. iii. 4), and the word retains from it the sense of totality in contrast to the constituent parts; but the chief associations of pleroma in their systems are with Greek philosophy, and the main thought is that of a state of completeness in contrast to deficiency (hysterema, Iren. I. xvi. 3; Hippol. vi. 31), or of the fullness of real existence in contrast to the empty void and unreality of mere phenomena (kenoma, Iren. I. iv. 1). Thus in Cerinthus it expressed the fullness of the Divine Life out of which the Divine Christ descended upon the man Jesus at his baptism, and into which He returned (Iren. I. xxvi. 1, III. xi. 1, xvi. 1). In the Valentinian system it stands in antithesis to the essential incomprehensible Godhead, as 'the circle of the Divine attributes,' the various means by which God reveals Himself: it is the totality of the thirty Aeons or emanations which proceed from God, but are separated alike from Him and from the material universe. It is at times almost localized, so that a thing is spoken of as 'within,' 'without,' 'above,' 'below' the Pleroma: more often it is the spirit-world, the archetypal ideal existing in the invisible heavens in contrast to the imperfect phenomenal manifestations of that ideal in the universe. Thus 'the whole Pleroma of the aeons' contributes each its own excellence to the historic Jesus, and He appears on earth 'as the perfect beauty and star of the Pleroma' (teleiotaton kallos kai astron tou pleromatos, Iren. I. xi. 6). Similarly it was used by writers as equivalent to the full completeness of perfect knowledge (Pistis Sophia, p. 15).

[Some] confess that the Father of all contains all things, and that there is nothing whatever outside of the Pleroma (for it is an absolute necessity that, [if there be anything outside of it,] it should be bounded and circumscribed by something greater than itself), and that they speak of what is without and what within in reference to knowledge and ignorance, and not with respect to local distance; but that, in the Pleroma, or in those things which are contained by the Father, the whole creation which we know to have been formed, having been made by the Demiurge, or by the angels, is contained by the unspeakable greatness, as the centre is in a circle, or as a spot is in a garment . . . .

— Iren. II. iv. 2

Again, each separate Aeon is called a pleroma in contrast to its earthly imperfect counterpart, so that in this sense the plural can be used, pleromata (Iren. I. xiv. 2); and even each individual has his or her Pleroma or spiritual counterpart (to pleroma autes of the Samaritan woman,—Heracleon, ap. Origen, xiii. p. 205).

It thus expressed the various thoughts which we should express by the Godhead, the ideal, heaven; and it is probably owing to this ambiguity, as well as to its heretical associations, that the word dropped out of Christian theology. It is still used in its ordinary untechnical meaning, e.g. Theophylact speaks of the Trinity as pleroma tou theou; but no use so technical as that in Ignatius reappears.

==== Diagram of the pleroma ====

First the • (Point), the Monad, Bythus (the Deep), the unknown and unknowable Father. Then the Δ (Triangle), Bythus and the first emanated pair or Duad, Nous (Mind) and its syzygy Aletheia (Truth). Then the □ (Square), the dual Duad, Tetractys or Quaternary, two males ||, the Logos (Word) and Anthrôpos (Man), two females, their syzygies, = Zoê (Life) and Ekklesia (the Church or Assembly), Seven in all. The Triangle the Potentiality of Spirit, the Square the Potentiality of Matter; the Vertical Straight Line the Potency of Spirit, and the Horizontal the Potency of Matter. Next comes the Pentagram ⋆, the Pentad, the mysterious symbol of the Manasáputras or Sons of Wisdom, which together with their syzygies make 10, or the Decad; and last of all, the Hexalpha or interlaced Triangles ✡ the Hexad, which with their syzygies make 12, or the Dodecad. Such are the Contents of the Pleroma or Completion, the Ideas in the Divine Mind, 28 in all, for Bythus or the Father is not reckoned, as it is the Root of all. The two small circles within the Pleroma are the syzygy Christos-Pneuma (Christ and the Holy Spirit); these are after-emanations, and, as such, from one aspect, typify the descent of Spirit to inform and evolve Matter, which essentially proceeds from the same source; and from another, the descent or incarnation of the Kumâras or the Higher Egos of Humanity.

The Circle of the Pleroma is bounded by a circumference emanated from Bythus (the Point), this is called the Horus (Boundary), Staurus (Stock, Stake, or Cross) and Metæcheus (Participator); it shuts off the Pleroma (or Completion) from the Hystêrema (the Inferiority or Incompletion), the larger from the smaller Circle, the Unmanifested from the Manifested. Within the Circle of the Hysterêma is the Square of primordial Matter, or Chaos, emanated by Sophia, called the Ektrôma (or Abortion). Above this is a Triangle, primordial Spirit, called the Common Fruit of the Pleroma, or Jesus, for to all below the Pleroma it appears as a unity. Notice how the Triangle and Square of the Hysterêma are a reflection of the Triangle and Square of the Pleroma. Finally, the plane of the paper, enclosing and penetrating all, is Sigê (Silence).

— G. R. S. Mead and H. P. Blavatsky (after Valentinus)

== Middle Platonism ==
John M. Dillon, in Pleroma and Noetic Cosmos: A Comparative Study, states that Gnosticism imported its concept of the ideal realm, or pleroma, from Plato's concept of the cosmos and Demiurge in Timaeus and of Philo's Noetic cosmos in contrast to the aesthetic cosmos. Dillon does this by contrasting the Noetic cosmos to passages from the Nag Hammadi, where the Aeons are expressed as the thoughts of God. Dillon expresses the concept that pleroma is a Gnostic adaptation of Hellenic ideas, since before Philo there is no Jewish tradition that accepts that the material world or cosmos was based on an ideal world that exists as well.

== Social sciences ==
=== Carl Jung ===
Carl Jung uses the term pleroma in his work, Seven Sermons to the Dead, a mystical text he attributed to Basilides of Alexandria, first published anonymously in 1916, and the only part of Liber Novus (The Red Book) to be published before his death. Jung reinterprets pleroma not only in Gnostic terms but as a symbol of the undifferentiated totality from which all opposites arise, laying the foundation for his psychological dualities such as conscious/unconscious and anima/animus.

=== Gregory Bateson ===
In his Steps to an Ecology of Mind, Gregory Bateson adopts and extends Jung's distinction between pleroma (the non-living world that is undifferentiated by subjectivity) and creatura (the living world, subject to perceptual difference, distinction, and information). What Bateson calls the "myth of power" is the epistemologically false application to Creatura of an element of Pleroma (non-living, undifferentiated).

== See also ==
- Absolute – Philosophical or theological concept
- Brahman – Metaphysical concept, unchanging Ultimate Reality in Hinduism
- Ein Sof – Infinite, unknowable aspect of God
- Empyrean – Highest heaven in ancient cosmologies
- Neoplatonism and Gnosticism
- Principle of plenitude – Philosophical principle
- World of Light – Heavenly realm in Mandaeism
