= Aeon =

Ancient Greek concept

The word aeon /ˈiːɒn/, also spelled eon (in American and Australian English), originally meant "life", "vital force" or "being", "generation" or "a period of time", though it tended to be translated as "age" in the sense of "ages", "forever", "timeless" or "for eternity". In Greek, it literally refers to the timespan of one hundred years. A cognate Latin word aevum (cf. αἰϝών) for "age" is present in words such as eternal, longevity and mediaeval.

Although the term aeon may be used in reference to a period of a billion years (especially in geology, cosmology and astronomy), its more common usage is for any long, indefinite period. Aeon can also refer to the four aeons on the geologic time scale that make up the Earth's history, the Hadean, Archean, Proterozoic, and the current aeon, Phanerozoic.

== Astronomy and cosmology ==
In astronomy, an aeon is defined as a billion years (10^{9} years, abbreviated AE).

Roger Penrose uses the word aeon to describe the period between successive and cyclic Big Bangs within the context of conformal cyclic cosmology.

== Philosophy and mysticism ==
In Buddhism, and Hinduism, aeon may be used as a translation of the term kalpa or mahakalpa (Sanskrit: महाकल्प). A mahakalpa is often said to be 1,334,240,000 years, the life cycle of the world.

Christianity's idea of "eternal life" comes from the word for life, zōḗ (ζωή), and a form of aión (αἰών), which has been translated to mean immortality in the majority text, but is argued by some to mean life in the next aeon, the Kingdom of God, or Heaven, instead.

According to some proponents of Christian universalism, the Greek New Testament scriptures use the word aión (αἰών) to mean a long period (or age-long) and the word aiṓnion (αἰώνιον) to mean "during a long period" (or similarly, age-during); thus, there was a time before the aeons, and the aeonian period is finite. After each person's mortal life ends, they are judged worthy of aeonian life or aeonian punishment. That is, after the period of the aeons, all punishment will cease and death is overcome and then God becomes the all in each one (1 Cor 15:28). Another universalist reading, prevalent among neoplatonists due to its similarity to views expressed in Plato's Timaeus, is that the "aeon" does not refer to a time, finite or infinite, but instead a Greek parallel of a Judaic view of distinct natures of time, between the χρόνος (chronos) of the present "age", or עולם הזה ('olam ha-zeh) and the αιώνιος (aionios) of the "age to come", or הָעוֹלָם הַבָּא ('olam ha-ba). Therefore, "aeonian life" and "aeonian punishment" would mean "life of the Age to Come" and "punishment of the Age to Come", and thus not necessarily "eternal life" and "eternal punishment".

Occultists of the Thelema and Ordo Templi Orientis (English: "Order of the Temple of the East") traditions sometimes speak of a "magical Aeon" that may last for perhaps as little as 2,000 years.

=== Gnosticism ===
In many Gnostic systems, the various emanations of God, who is also known by such names as the One, the Monad, Aion teleos ("The Broadest Aeon", Greek: αἰών τέλεος), Bythos ("depth or profundity", Greek: βυθός), Proarkhe ("before the beginning", Greek: προαρχή), Arkhe ("the beginning", Greek: ἀρχή), Sophia ("wisdom"), and Christos ("the Anointed One"), are called Aeons. In the different systems these emanations are differently named, classified, and described, but the emanation theory itself is common to all forms of Gnosticism.

In the Basilidian Gnosis they are called sonships (υἱότητες huiotetes; singular: υἱότης huiotes); according to Marcus, they are numbers and sounds; in Valentinianism they form male/female pairs called "syzygies" (Greek συζυγίαι, from σύζυγοι syzygoi).

== See also ==
- Aion (deity)
- Century – Unit of time lasting 100 years
- Kalpa (aeon)
- Millennium – Time period of 1000 years
- Saeculum – comparable Latin concept
- Aeon (company)
- Aeon (greek rapper)
- Young's Literal Translation § Eternity or age
