= Abraxas =

Gnostic mystical word with many meanings

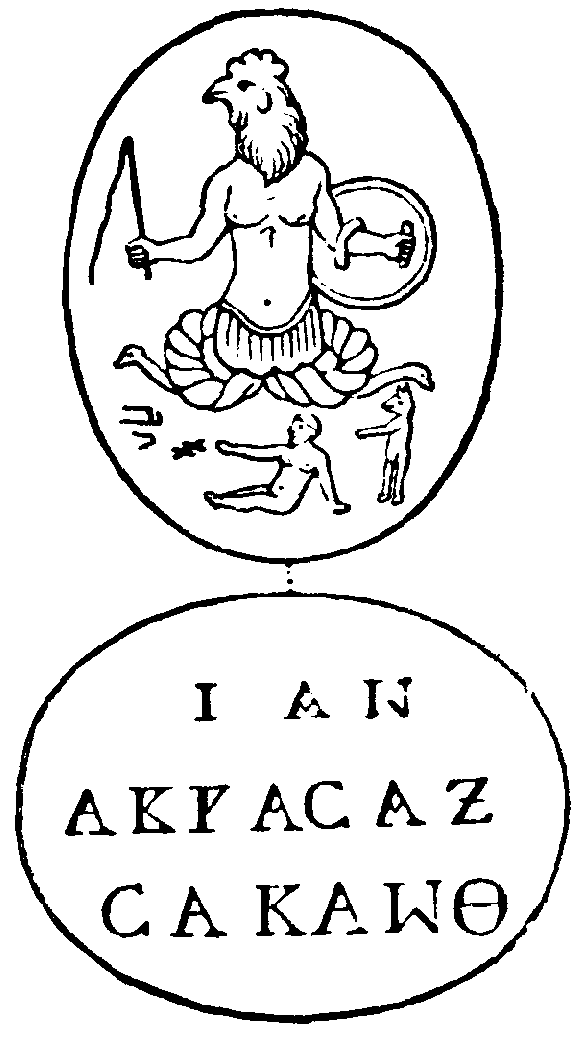
Engraving from an Abraxas stone.

Abraxas or Abrasax (Biblical Greek: Ἀβράξας or Ἀβρασάξ) is a term for the "Great Archon" in Gnostic Christianity. The word is found in Gnostic texts such as the Holy Book of the Great Invisible Spirit and the Apocalypse of Adam, and also appears in the Greek Magical Papyri. It was engraved on certain antique gemstones, called on that account Abraxas stones, which were used as amulets or charms.

There are similarities and differences between such figures in reports about Basilides's teaching, ancient Gnostic texts, the larger Greco-Roman magical traditions, and modern magical and esoteric writings.

== Etymology ==
The initial attested spelling was Abrasax (Αβρασαξ). It appears in nearly all the legends on gems; in the Greek writers, Hippolytus, Epiphanius, Didymus (De Trin. iii. 42), and Theodoret; and in Latin writers Augustine and Praedestinatus. The spelling Abraxas, common today, probably originated in the Latin transliteration, either due to a confusion made between the Greek letters sigma (Σ) and xi (Ξ), or to a euphemistic inversion. It appears in the translator of Irenaeus and the other Latin authors, and even, though most sparingly, in the magical papyri and engraved stones.

The attempts to discover a derivation for the name, Greek, Hebrew, Coptic, or other, have not been entirely successful:

=== Egyptian ===
- Claudius Salmasius (1588–1653) thought it Egyptian, but never gave the proofs which he promised.
- J. J. Bellermann thinks it is a compound of the Egyptian words abrak and sax, meaning "the honorable and hallowed word", or "the word is adorable".
- Samuel Sharpe finds in it an Egyptian invocation to the Godhead, meaning "hurt me not".

=== Hebrew ===
- Abraham Geiger sees in it a Grecized form of Ha-Brachah, "The Blessing". Charles William King supports this gloss, citing a similar translation of the word abracadabra as Ha-Brachah-dabarata, "Pronounce the Blessing".
- J. B. Passerius derives it from abh, "father", bara, "to create", and a- negative—"the uncreated Father".
- Wendelin connected it with the numerical value of "abh" father, "ben" son, rouach hakadōs holy spirit.
- Giuseppe Barzilai goes back for explanation to the first verse of the Ana BeKoach prayer, for which he takes on the traditional attribution to Nehunya ben HaKanah of the Mishnaic period, but it has been critically redated to the middle ages. The literal rendering of the line is "O [God], with thy mighty right hand deliver the captive [people]". By forming an acronym (from the initial letters of the first two words, the final letters of the last two words, then the final letters of the fourth and third words), the word אברהכת is proposed. Barzilai latinizes it freely as Abrakd (pronounced Abrakad), which he interprets as "the host of the winged ones", i.e., angels. His theory is without regard to grammar (the usual word-order in Hebrew compounds, grammatical number), nor to any attestation or parallel. Further, while this theory can explain the mystic word Abracadabra, the association of this phrase with Abraxas is uncertain. Considering the Abraxas stone more generally, Barzilai noted some iconographic similarities between them and biblical passages, for example between Harpocrates and Moses.

=== Greek ===
- Wendelin discovers a compound of the initial letters, amounting to 365 in numerical value, of four Hebrew and three Greek words, all written with Greek characters: ab, ben, rouach, hakadōs; sōtēria apo xylou ("Father, Son, Spirit, holy; salvation from the cross").
- According to a note of Isaac de Beausobre's, Jean Hardouin accepted the first three of these, taking the four others for the initials of the Greek anthrōpous sōzōn hagiōi xylōi, "saving mankind by the holy cross".
- Isaac de Beausobre derives Abraxas from the Greek habros and saō, "the beautiful, the glorious Savior".
- Gaius Julius Hyginus (Fabulae, 183) gives Abrax Aslo Therbeeo as names of horses of the sun mentioned by 'Homerus'. The passage is miserably corrupt, but it may not be accidental that the first three syllables make Abraxas.

=== Other ===
The seven letters spelling its name may represent each of the seven classic planets.

Perhaps the word may be included among those mysterious expressions discussed by Adolf von Harnack, "which belong to no known speech, and by their singular collocation of vowels and consonants give evidence that they belong to some mystic dialect, or take their origin from some supposed divine inspiration".

The Egyptian author of the book De Mysteriis in reply to Porphyry (vii. 4) admits a preference of 'barbarous' to vernacular names in sacred things, urging a peculiar sanctity in the languages of certain nations, as the Egyptians and Assyrians; and Origen (Contra Cels. i. 24) refers to the 'potent names' used by Egyptian sages, Persian Magi, and Indian Brahmins, signifying deities in the several languages.

== Written sources ==
=== In heresiologies ===
Several heresiological works (from 2nd century Proto-orthodox Christianity through the 5th century) describe Abraxas in the context of the Basilidian heresy, but it is uncertain what the actual role and function of Abraxas was in the Basilidian system, as they often show no direct acquaintance with the doctrines of Basilides himself.

==== As an archon ====
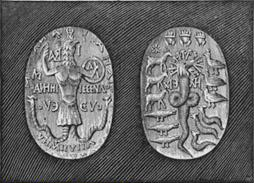
Gemstone carved with Abraxas, obverse and reverse.

In the system described by Irenaeus, "the Unbegotten Father" is the progenitor of Nous "Discerning Mind"; Nous produced Logos "Word, Reason"; Logos produced Phronesis "Mindfulness"; Phronesis produced Sophia "Wisdom" and Dynamis "Potentiality"; Sophia and Dynamis produced the principalities, powers, and angels, the last of whom create "the first heaven". They, in turn, originate a second series, who create a second heaven. The process continues in like manner until 365 heavens are in existence, the angels of the last or visible heaven being the authors of our world. "The ruler" [principem, i.e., probably ton archonta] of the 365 heavens "is Abraxas, and for this reason he contains within himself 365 numbers".

The name occurs in the Refutation of All Heresies (vii. 26) by Hippolytus of Rome, who appears in these chapters to have followed the Exegetica of Basilides. After describing the manifestation of the Gospel in the Ogdoad and Hebdomad, he adds that the Basilidians have a long account of the innumerable creations and powers in the several 'stages' of the upper world (diastemata), in which they speak of 365 heavens and say that "their great archon" is Abrasax, because his name contains the number 365, the number of the days in the year; i.e. the sum of the numbers denoted by the Greek letters in ΑΒΡΑΣΑΞ according to the rules of isopsephy is 365:

Α = 1, Β = 2, Ρ = 100, Α = 1, Σ = 200, Α = 1, Ξ = 60

==== As a god ====
Epiphanius (Haer. 69, 73 f.) appears to follow partly Irenaeus, partly the lost Compendium of Hippolytus. He designates Abraxas more distinctly as "the power above all, and First Principle", "the cause and first archetype" of all things; and mentions that the Basilidians referred to 365 as the number of parts (mele) in the human body, as well as of days in the year.

In Adversus omnes haereses (c. 4), the Pseudo-Tertullian likewise follows Hippolytus's Compendium, and adds some further particulars; that 'Abraxas' gave birth to Mind (nous), the first in the series of primary powers enumerated likewise by Irenaeus and Epiphanius; that the world, as well as the 365 heavens, was created in honour of 'Abraxas'; and that Christ was sent not by the Maker of the world but by 'Abraxas'.

Nothing can be built on the vague allusions of Jerome, according to whom 'Abraxas' meant for Basilides "the greatest God" (De vir. ill. 21), "the highest God" (Dial. adv. Lucif. 23), "the Almighty God" (Comm. in Amos iii. 9), and "the Lord the Creator" (Comm. in Nah. i. 11). The notices in Theodoret (Haer. fab. i. 4), Augustine (Haer. 4), and 'Praedestinatus' (i. 3), have no independent value.

=== In Sethian texts ===
With the availability of primary sources, such as those in the Nag Hammadi library, the identity of Abraxas remains unclear, but it appears lower on the cosmological hierarchy, than in the heresiological sources. Scholars have grouped three texts that allude to him under Sethian gnosticism.

==== As an aeon ====
The Holy Book of the Great Invisible Spirit, for instance, refers to Abraxas as an Aeon dwelling with Sophia and other Aeons of the Pleroma in the light of the luminary Eleleth. In several texts, the luminary Eleleth is the last of the luminaries (Spiritual Lights) that come forward, and it is the Aeon Sophia, associated with Eleleth, who encounters darkness and becomes involved in the chain of events that leads to the Demiurge's rule of this world, and the salvage effort that ensues. As such, the role of Aeons of Eleleth, including Abraxas, Sophia, and others, pertains to this outer border of the Pleroma that encounters the ignorance of the world of Lack and interacts to rectify the error of ignorance in the world of materiality.

In the Apocalypse of Adam, Abrasax is sent along with Sablo and Gamaliel to bring some of the Gnostic people "out of the fire and the wrath, and take them above the aeons and the rulers of the powers, and take them away [...] of life [...] and take them away [...] aeons [...] dwelling place of the great [...] there, with the holy angels and the aeons. The men will be like those angels, for they are not strangers to them."

== Magical objects ==
=== Abraxas stones ===
A vast number of engraved stones are in existence, to which the name "Abraxas-stones" has long been given. The subjects are mythological, and chiefly grotesque, with various inscriptions, in which ΑΒΡΑΣΑΞ often occurs, alone or with other words. Sometimes the whole space is taken up with the inscription. In certain obscure magical writings of Egyptian origin ἀβραξάς or ἀβρασάξ is found associated with other names which frequently accompany it on gems; it is also found on the Greek metal curse tablets (defixiones), among other mystical words.

The meaning of the legends is seldom intelligible: but some of the gems, if not all, are amulets. Antiquarians from the 17th-19th centuries developed a thematic classification of the artefacts, some bearing Abrasax as inscriptions and some related only by iconography. Today they are often studied as part of a wider class of magical objects.

A print from Bernard de Montfaucon's L'antiquité expliquée et représentée en figures (Band 2,2 page 358 ff plaque 144) with different images of Abraxas.

- The Abraxas-image alone, without external Iconisms, and either without, or but a simple, inscription. The Abrasax-imago proper is usually found with a shield, a sphere or wreath and whip, a sword or sceptre, a cock's head, the body clad with armor, and a serpent's tail. There are, however, innumerable modifications of these figures: Lions', hawks', and eagles' skins, with or without mottos, with or without a trident and star, and with or without reverses.
- Abraxas combined with other Gnostic Powers. If, in a single instance, this supreme being was represented in connection with powers of subordinate rank, nothing could have been more natural than to represent it also in combination with its emanations, the seven superior spirits, the thirty Aeons, and the three hundred and sixty-five cosmical Genii; and yet this occurs upon none of the relics as yet discovered, whilst those with Powers not belonging to the Gnostic system are frequently met with.
- Abraxas with Jewish symbols. This combination predominates, not indeed with symbolical figures, but in the form of inscriptions, such as: Iao, Eloai, Adonai, Sabaoth, Michael, Gabriel, Uriel, Onoel, Ananoel, Raphael, Japlael, and many others. The name ΙΑΩ, to which ΣΑΒΑΩΘ is sometimes added, is found with this figure even more frequently than ΑΒΡΑΣΑΞ, and they are often combined. Beside an Abrasax figure the following, for instance, is found: ΙΑΩ ΑΒΡΑΣΑΞ ΑΔΩΝ ΑΤΑ, "Iao Abrasax, thou art the Lord". With the Abrasax-shield are also found the divine names Sabaoth Iao, Iao Abrasax, Adonai Abrasax, etc.
- Abraxas with Persian deities. Chiefly, perhaps exclusively, in combination with Mithras, and possibly a few specimens with the mystical gradations of mithriaca, upon Gnostic relics.
- Abraxas with Egyptian deities. It is represented as a figure, with the sun-god Phre leading his chariot, or standing upon a lion borne by a crocodile; also as a name, in connection with Isis, Phtha, Neith, Athor, Thot, Anubis, Horus, and Harpocrates in a Lotus-leaf; also with a representation of the Nile, the symbol of prolificacy, with Agathodaemon (Chnuphis), or with scarabs, the symbols of the revivifying energies of nature.
- Abraxas with Grecian deities, sometimes as a figure, and again with the simple name, in connection with the planets, especially Venus, Hecate, and Zeus, richly engraved.
- Simple or ornamental representations of the journey of departed spirits through the starry world to Amenti, borrowed, as those above-named, from the Egyptian religion. The spirit wafted from the earth, either with or without the corpse, and transformed at times into Osiris or Helios, is depicted as riding upon the back of a crocodile, or lion, guided in some instances by Anubis, and other genii, and surrounded by stars; and thus attended hastening to judgment and a higher life.
- Representations of the judgment, which, like the preceding, are either ornamental or plain, and imitations of Egyptian art, with slight modifications and prominent symbols, as the vessel in which Anubis weighs the human heart, as comprehending the entire life of man, with all its errors.
- Worship and consecrating services were, according to the testimony of Origen in his description of the ophitic diagram, conducted with figurative representations in the secret assemblies of the Gnostics unless indeed the statement on which this opinion rests designates, as it readily may, a statue of glyptic workmanship. It is uncertain if any of the discovered specimens actually represent the Gnostic cultus and religious ceremonies, although upon some may be seen an Abrasax-figure laying its hand upon a person kneeling, as though for baptism or benediction.
- Astrological groups. The Gnostics referred everything to astrology. Even the Bardesenists located the inferior powers, the seven, twelve and thirty-six, among the planets, in the zodiac and starry region, as rulers of the celestial phenomena which influence the earth and its inhabitants. Birth and health, wealth and allotment, are considered to be mainly under their control. Other sects betray still stronger partiality for astrological conceits. Many of these specimens also are improperly ascribed to Gnosticism, but the Gnostic origin of others is too manifest to allow of contradiction.
- Inscriptions, of which there are three kinds:
  - Those destitute of symbols or iconisms, engraved upon stone, iron, lead and silver plates, in Greek, Latin, Coptic or other languages, of amuletic import, and in the form of prayers for health and protection.
  - Those with some symbol, as a serpent in an oval form.
  - Those with iconisms, at times very small, but often made the prominent object, so that the legend is limited to a single word or name. Sometimes the legends are as important as the images. It is remarkable, however, that thus far none of the plates or medals found seem to have any of the forms or prayers reported by Origen. It is necessary to distinguish those specimens that belong to the proper Gnostic period from such as are indisputably of later origin, especially since there is a strong temptation to place those of more recent date among the older class.

==== Gallery ====
Prints from Bernard de Montfaucon's L'antiquité expliquée et représentée en figures (Band 2,2) page 358 ff.

Plaque 144

Plaque 145

Plaque 146

Plaque 147

Plaque 148

Plaque 149

==== Anguipede ====
In a great majority of instances the name Abraxas is associated with a singular composite figure, having a Chimera-like appearance somewhat resembling a basilisk or the Greek primordial god Chronos (not to be confused with the Greek titan Cronus). According to E. A. Wallis Budge, "as a Pantheus, i.e. All-God, he appears on the amulets with the head of a cock (Phœbus) or of a lion (Ra or Mithras), the body of a man, and his legs are serpents which terminate in scorpions, types of the Agathodaimon. In his right hand he grasps a club, or a flail, and in his left is a round or oval shield." This form was also referred to as the Anguipede. Budge surmised that Abrasax was "a form of the Adam Kadmon of the Kabbalists and the Primal Man whom God made in His own image".

Some parts at least of the figure mentioned above are solar symbols, and the Basilidian Abrasax is manifestly connected with the sun. J. J. Bellermann has speculated that "the whole represents the Supreme Being, with his Five great Emanations, each one pointed out by means of an expressive emblem. Thus, from the human body, the usual form assigned to the Deity, forasmuch as it is written that God created man in his own image, issue the two supporters, Nous and Logos, symbols of the inner sense and the quickening understanding, as typified by the serpents, for the same reason that had induced the old Greeks to assign this reptile for an attribute to Pallas. His head—a cock's—represents Phronesis, the fowl being emblematical of foresight and vigilance. His two hands bear the badges of Sophia and Dynamis, the shield of Wisdom, and the scourge of Power."

==== Origin ====
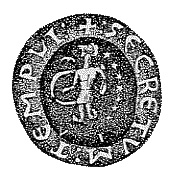
Medieval seal representing Abraxas.

In the absence of other evidence to show the origin of these curious relics of antiquity the occurrence of a name known as Basilidian on patristic authority has not unnaturally been taken as a sufficient mark of origin, and the early collectors and critics assumed this whole group to be the work of Gnostics. During the last three centuries attempts have been made to sift away successively those gems that had no claim to be considered in any sense Gnostic, or specially Basilidian, or connected with Abrasax. The subject is one which has exercised the ingenuity of many savants, but it may be said that all the engraved stones fall into three classes:

- Abraxas, or stones of Basilidian origin
- Abraxastes, or stones originating in ancient forms of worship and adapted by the Gnostics
- Abraxoïdes, or stones absolutely unconnected with the doctrine of Basilides

While it would be rash to assert positively that no existing gems were the work of Gnostics, there is no valid reason for attributing all of them to such an origin. The fact that the name occurs on these gems in connection with representations of figures with the head of a cock, a lion, or an ass, and the tail of a serpent was formerly taken in the light of what Irenaeus says about the followers of Basilides:

These men, moreover, practise magic, and use images, incantations, invocations, and every other kind of curious art. Coining also certain names as if they were those of the angels, they proclaim some of these as belonging to the first, and others to the second heaven; and then they strive to set forth the names, principles, angels, and powers of the 365 imagined heavens.

— Adversus hæreses, I. xxiv. 5; cf. Epiph. Haer. 69 D; Philastr. Suer. 32

Incantations by mystic names were characteristic of the hybrid Gnosticism planted in Spain and southern Gaul at the end of the fourth century and at the beginning of the fifth, which Jerome connects with Basilides and which (according to his Epist., lxxv.) used the name Abraxas.

It is therefore not unlikely that some Gnostics used amulets, though the confident assertions of modern writers to this effect rest on no authority. Isaac de Beausobre properly calls attention to the significant silence of Clement in the two passages in which he instructs the Christians of Alexandria on the right use of rings and gems, and the figures which may legitimately be engraved on them (Paed. 241 ff.; 287 ff.). But no attempt to identify the figures on existing gems with the personages of Gnostic mythology has had any success, and Abraxas is the only Gnostic term found in the accompanying legends that is not known to belong to other religions or mythologies. The present state of the evidence therefore suggests that their engravers and the Basilidians received the mystic name from a common source now unknown.

=== Magical papyri ===
Having due regard to the magic papyri, in which many of the unintelligible names of the Abrasax-stones reappear, besides directions for making and using gems with similar figures and formulas for magical purposes, it can scarcely be doubted that many of these stones are pagan amulets and instruments of magic.

The magic papyri reflect the same ideas as the Abrasax-gems and often bear Hebraic names of God. The following example is illustrative: "I conjure you by Iaō Sabaōth Adōnai Abrasax, and by the great god, Iaeō". The patriarchs are sometimes addressed as deities; for which fact many instances may be adduced. In the group "Iakoubia, Iaōsabaōth Adōnai Abrasax", the first name seems to be composed of Jacob and Ya. Similarly, entities considered angels in Judaism are invoked as gods alongside Abrasax: thus "I conjure you ... by the god Michaēl, by the god Souriēl, by the god Gabriēl, by the god Raphaēl, by the god Abrasax Ablathanalba Akrammachari ...".

In text PGM V. 96–172, Abraxas is identified as part of the "true name which has been transmitted to the prophets of Israel" of the "Headless One, who created heaven and earth, who created night and day ... Osoronnophris whom none has ever seen ... awesome and invisible god with an empty spirit"; the name also includes Iaō and Adōnai. "Osoronnophris" represents Egyptian Wsir Wn-nfr, "Osiris the Perfect Being". Another identification with Osiris is made in PGM VII. 643-51: "you are not wine, but the guts of Osiris, the guts of ... Ablanathanalba Akrammachamarei Eee, who has been stationed over necessity, Iakoub Ia Iaō Sabaōth Adōnai Abrasax." PGM VIII. 1-63, on the other hand, identifies Abraxas as a name of "Hermes" (i.e. Thoth). Here the numerological properties of the name are invoked, with its seven letters corresponding to the seven planets and its isopsephic value of 365 corresponding to the days of the year. Thoth is also identified with Abrasax in PGM LXXIX. 1-7: "I am the soul of darkness, Abrasax, the eternal one, Michaēl, but my true name is Thōouth, Thōouth."

One papyrus titled the "Monad" or the "Eighth Book of Moses" (PGM XIII. 1–343) contains an invocation to a supreme creator God; Abraxas is given as being the name of this God in the language of the baboons. The papyrus goes on to describe a cosmogonic myth about Abraxas, describing how he created the Ogdoad by laughing. His first laughter created light; his second divided the primordial waters; his third created the mind; his fourth created fertility and procreation; his fifth created fate; his sixth created time (as the sun and moon); and his seventh and final laughter created the soul. Then, from various sounds made by Abrasax, there arose the serpent Python who "foreknew all things", the first man (or Fear), and the god Iaō, "who is lord of all". The man fought with Iaō, and Abrasax declared that Iaō's power would derive from both of the others, and that Iaō would take precedence over all the other gods. This text also describes Helios as an archangel of God/Abrasax.

The Leyden Papyrus recommends that this invocation be pronounced to the moon:

[24] Ho! Sax, Amun, Sax, Abraxas; for thou art the moon, (25) the chief of the stars, he that did form them, listen to the things that I have(?) said, follow the (words) of my mouth, reveal thyself to me, Than, (26) Thana, Thanatha, otherwise Thei, this is my correct name.

=== Other ===
Abrasax (אברסכס, occasionally אברסקוס, אברכסיס, etc.) is also found in several Semitic sources, extending into the middle ages: late antique Aramaic (or bilingual) magical texts from Palestine; incantation bowls from Mesopotamia; Judeo-Arabic and Hebrew magical texts from the Cairo Genizah; the Hebrew Sefer HaRazim which has been reconstructed from the Genizah - here Abrasax is the first among some thirty angels directing the sun during the day; Aramaic-Hebrew The Sword of Moses (?); and possibly in an Arabic charm from Aswan (as ابراهوس).

== In architecture ==
- Les Espaces d'Abraxas is a high-density housing complex in Noisy-le-Grand near Paris, France designed by Spanish architect Ricardo Bofill and opened in 1983.

== In literature ==
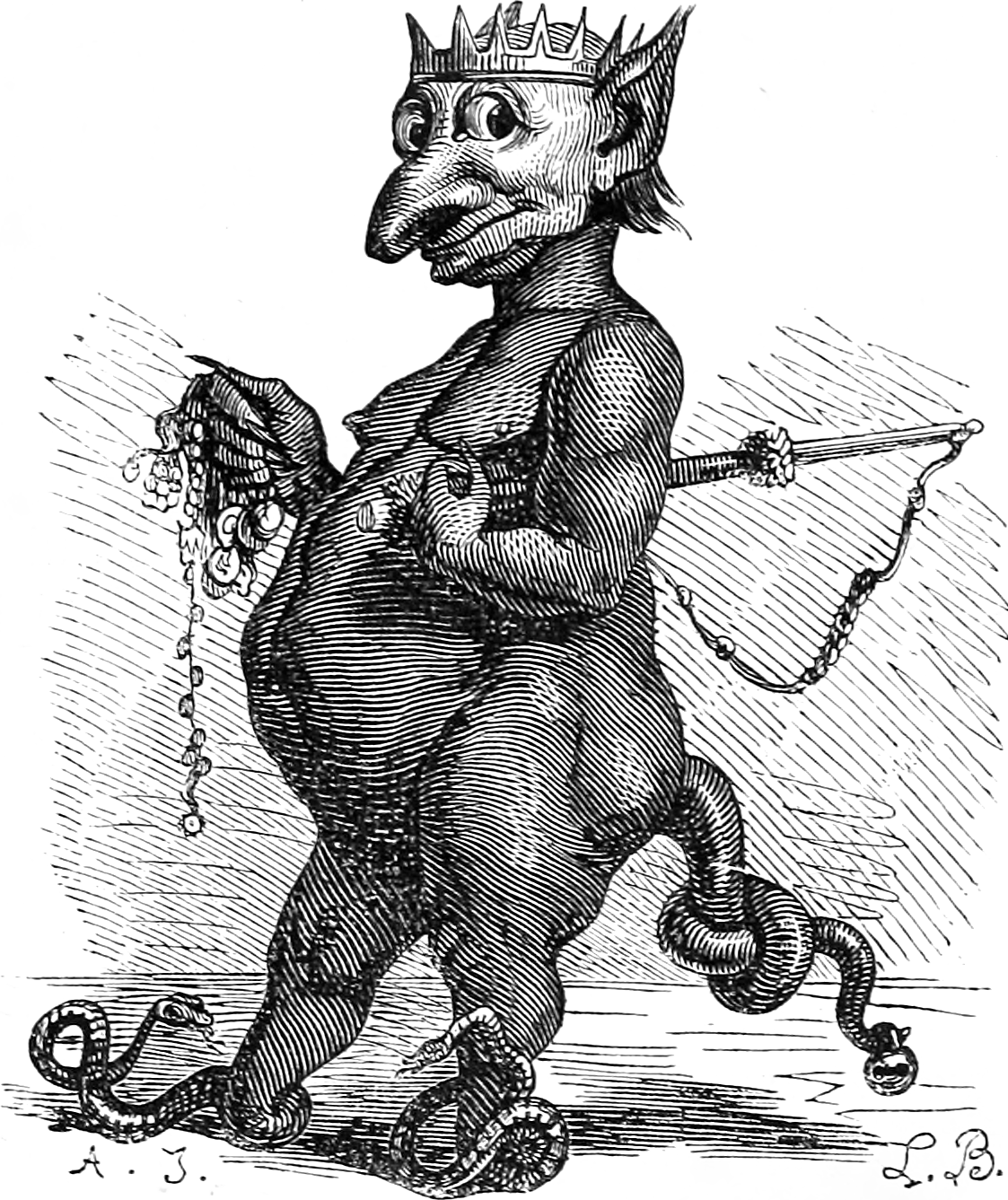
Abraxas from Infernal Dictionary, 6th Edition, 1863, with descriptions of Abraxas as having a "rooster's head, dragon's feet and a whip in his hand", and a "king's head and snakes in lieu of feet"

- In the 1516 novel Utopia by Thomas More, the island called Utopia once had the name "Abraxa", which scholars have suggested is a related use.
- Jacques Collin de Plancy's Dictionnaire Infernal (Infernal Dictionary), published in 1818, states that Abraxas (or Abracax) was an anguipede (a deity represented with snake feet) pagan God of "Asian theogonies" with a "rooster's head, dragon's feet and a whip in his hand". De Plancy says that demonologists describe Abraxas as a demon having a "king's head and snakes in lieu of feet".
- Abrasax is invoked in Aleister Crowley's 1913 work "The Gnostic Mass" of Ecclesia Gnostica Catholica:
  IO IO IO IAO SABAO KURIE ABRASAX KURIE MEITHRAS KURIE PHALLE. IO PAN, IO PAN PAN IO ISCHUROS, IO ATHANATOS IO ABROTOS IO IAO. KAIRE PHALLE KAIRE PAMPHAGE KAIRE PANGENETOR. HAGIOS, HAGIOS, HAGIOS IAO.
- Abraxas is an important figure in Carl Jung's 1916 book Seven Sermons to the Dead, a representation of the driving force of individuation (synthesis, maturity, oneness), referred with the figures for the driving forces of differentiation (emergence of consciousness and opposites), Helios God-the-Sun, and the Devil.
  There is a God about whom you know nothing, because men have forgotten him. We call him by his name: Abraxas. He is less definite than God or Devil. ... Abraxas is activity: nothing can resist him but the unreal ... Abraxas stands above the sun[-god] and above the devil If the Pleroma were capable of having a being, Abraxas would be its manifestation.
  — 2nd Sermon
  That which is spoken by God-the-Sun is life; that which is spoken by the Devil is death; Abraxas speaketh that hallowed and accursed word, which is life and death at the same time. Abraxas begetteth truth and lying, good and evil, light and darkness in the same word and in the same act. Wherefore is Abraxas terrible.
  — 3rd Sermon
- Several references to the god Abraxas appear in Hermann Hesse's 1919 novel Demian, such as:
  The bird fights its way out of the egg. The egg is the world. Who would be born must first destroy a world. The bird flies to God. That God's name is Abraxas.
  — Max Demian
  ... it appears that Abraxas has much deeper significance. We may conceive of the name as that of the godhead whose symbolic task is the uniting of godly and devilish elements.
  — Dr. Follens
  Abraxas doesn't take exception to any of your thoughts or any of your dreams. Never forget that. But he will leave you once you become blameless and normal.
  — Pistorius
- In James Branch Cabell's novel Jurgen (1919) in Chapter 44: In the Manager's Office, Koshchei, who made all things as they are, when identified as Koshchei the Deathless, calls himself "Koshchei, or Adnari, or Ptha, or Jaldalaoth, or Abraxas—it is all one what I may be called hereabouts." Since Jung wrote about Koshchei (see above) in 1916, and Jurgen was published in 1919, Cabell might well have been familiar with Jung's treatise when he used the name.
- Salman Rushdie's novel Midnight's Children (1981) contains a reference to Abraxas in the chapter "Abracadabra":
  Abracadabra: not an Indian word at all, a cabbalistic formula derived from the name of the supreme god of the Basilidan gnostics, containing the number 365, the number of the days of the year, and of the heavens, and of the spirits emanating from the god Abraxas.
  — Saleem Sinai

== In popular culture ==
- In the 2022 folk horror video game The Excavation of Hob's Barrow, published by Wadjet Eye Games, Abraxas features as a long-dormant god/demon inspired by the original Gnostic mythology.
- The 2023 horror movie Late Night with the Devil includes mention of a fictional cult that worships Abraxas.

== See also ==
- Arimanius – Deity of darkness in Greek and Latin texts
- Chronos – Ancient Greek personification of time
- Sator Square – Roman-era word square with a Latin palindrome
