= Androcydes =

Androcydes (also transliterated Androkydes) (Ancient Greek: Ἀνδροκύδης) may refer to:

- Androcydes (painter), Greek painter, 4th century BC
- Androcydes (physician), Greek physician contemporary with Alexander the Great
- Androcydes (Pythagorean), author of the treatise On Pythagoric Symbols
