= Curse tablet =

Small tablet with a curse written on it from the Greco-Roman world

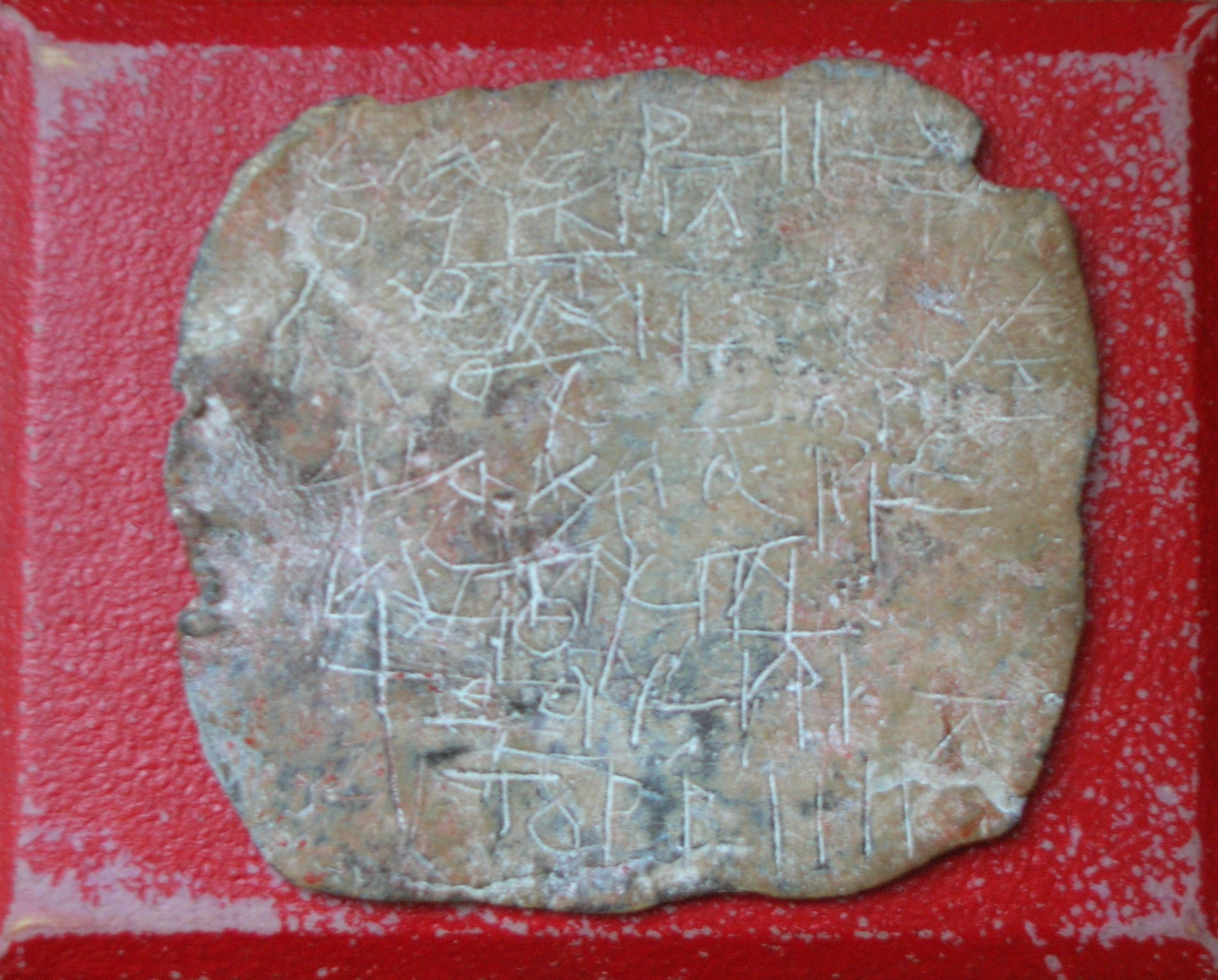
Eyguieres curse tablet

A curse tablet (Latin: tabella defixionis, defixio; Greek: κατάδεσμος, romanized: katadesmos) is a small tablet with a curse written on it from the Greco-Roman world. Its name originated from the Greek and Latin words for "pierce" and "bind". The tablets were used to ask the gods, place spirits, or the deceased to perform an action on a person or object, or otherwise compel the subject of the curse.

== Description ==
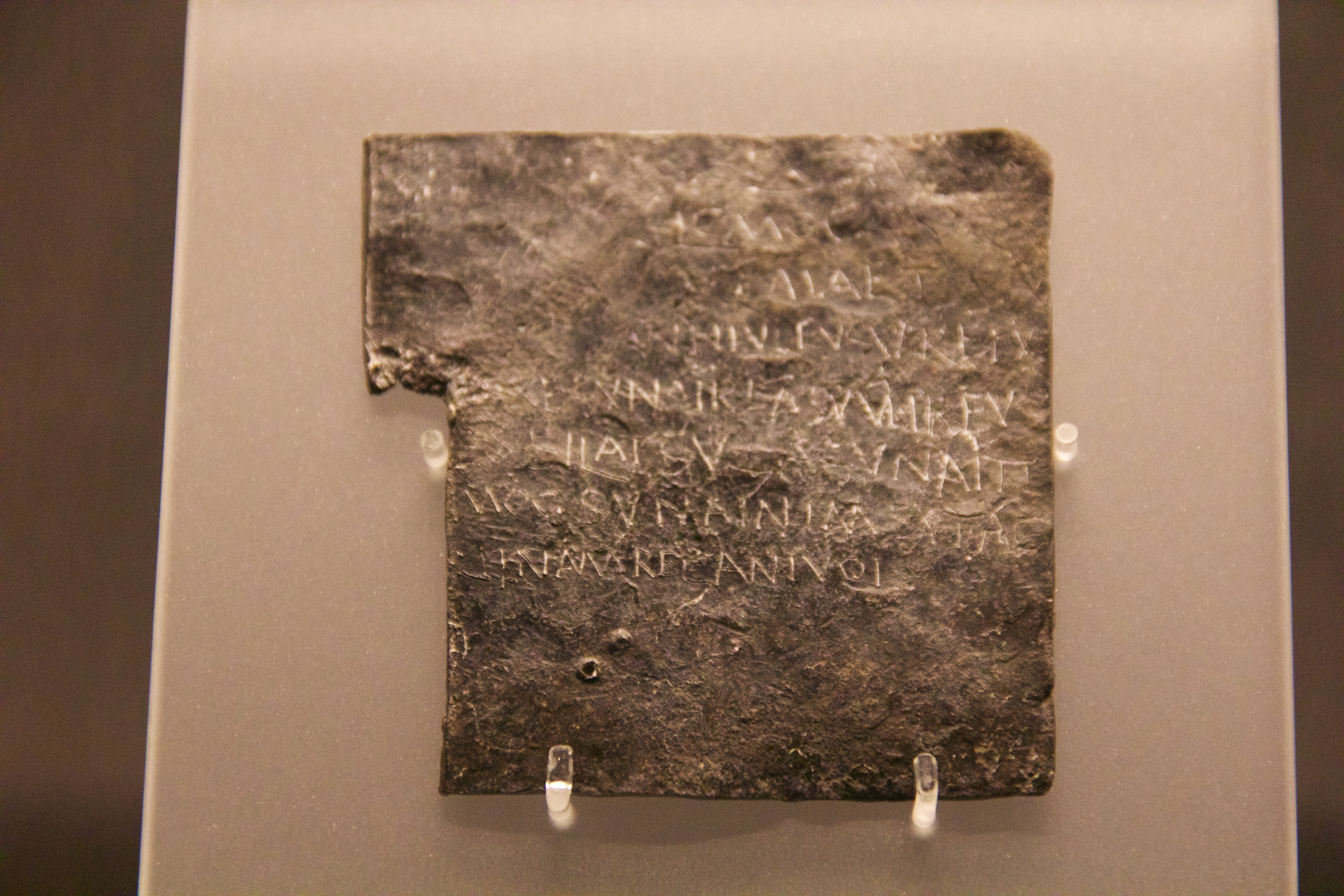
One of the 130 Bath curse tablets. The inscription in British Latin translates as: "May he who carried off Vilbia from me become liquid as the water. May she who so obscenely devoured her become dumb."

Curse tablets are typically very thin sheets of lead with the text scratched on in tiny letters. They were then often rolled, folded, or pierced with nails, and the tablets were then usually placed beneath the ground: either buried in graves or tombs, thrown into wells or pools, sequestered in underground sanctuaries, or nailed to the walls of temples. Tablets were also used for love spells and when used in this manner they were placed inside the home of the desired target. They are sometimes discovered along with small dolls or figurines (sometimes inaccurately referred to as "Voodoo dolls",) which may also be pierced by nails. The figurines resembled the target and often had both their feet and hands bound. Curse tablets also included hair or pieces of clothing. This was seen as a way to give them strength through inclusion of the central essence (Greek: Ousia) of the person. This is especially the case in love spells, which calls for "hair from the head of the love target". Some love spells have even been discovered "folded around some hair", probably to bind the spell itself. "Not all tablets included a personal name, but it is clear especially in the Roman period, that tablets were sometimes prepared in advance, with space left for inserting the names provided by paying customers." The cursing rituals may also have incorporated physical binding gestures and spoken elements.

The texts on curse tablets are typically addressed to infernal or liminal gods such as Pluto, Charon, Hecate, and Persephone, sometimes via the mediation of a dead person (probably the corpse in whose grave the tablet was deposited). Some texts do not invoke the gods, however, but merely list the targets of the curse, the crimes or conditions upon which the curse is valid, and/or the intended ill to befall them. Some tablets are inscribed with nothing more than the names of the targets, leading to the supposition that an oral spell may have accompanied the manufacture of the curse. The texts on the tablets were not always curses; tablets were also used to help the dead. Those at whose grave sites these were placed had usually died at a very young age or in a violent manner, and the tablet was supposed to help lay their souls to rest in spite of their untimely deaths. The language of those texts that do give context is often concerned with justice, either listing the target's crimes in great detail, handing over responsibility for their punishment to the gods, using indefinite grammar. Frequently, such curse tablets are also inscribed with additional, otherwise meaningless "curse" words such as Bazagra, Bescu, or Berebescu, seemingly in order to lend them a kind of supernatural efficacy.

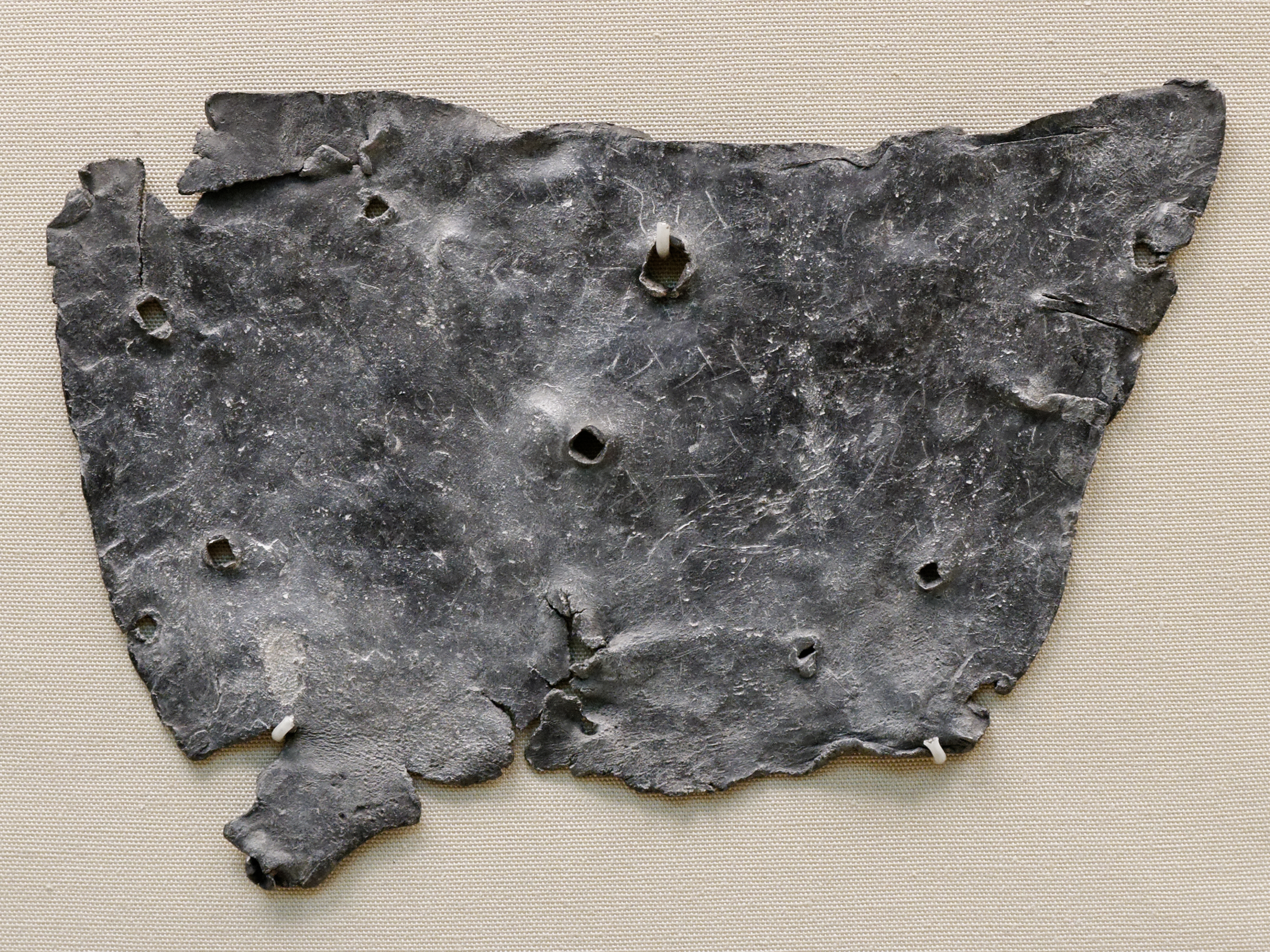
Curse tablet found in London. Inscription reads: "I curse Tretia Maria and her life and mind and memory and liver and lungs mixed up together, and her words, thoughts and memory; thus may she be unable to speak what things are concealed, nor be able." (translation: British Museum)

Many of those discovered at Athens refer to court cases and curse the opposing litigant, asking ("May he...") that he botch his performance in court, forget his words, become dizzy and so forth. Others include erotic binding-spells, and spells ranged against thieves, and business and sporting rivals. Those curse tablets targeted at thieves or other criminals may have been more public, and more acceptable; some scholars even refuse to apply the word "curse" to such "positive" texts, preferring expressions such as "judicial prayers".

In 1979/1980, the Bath curse tablets were found at the site of Aquae Sulis (now Bath in England). All but one of the 130 tablets concerned the restitution of stolen goods. Over 80 similar tablets have been discovered in and about the remains of a temple to Mercury nearby, at West Hill, Uley, making south-western Britain one of the major centres for finds of Latin defixiones.

In Ancient Egypt, so-called "Execration Texts" appear around the time of the 12th Dynasty, listing the names of enemies written on clay figurines or pottery which were then smashed and buried beneath a building under construction (so that they were symbolically "smothered"), or in a cemetery.

== Voces mysticae ==
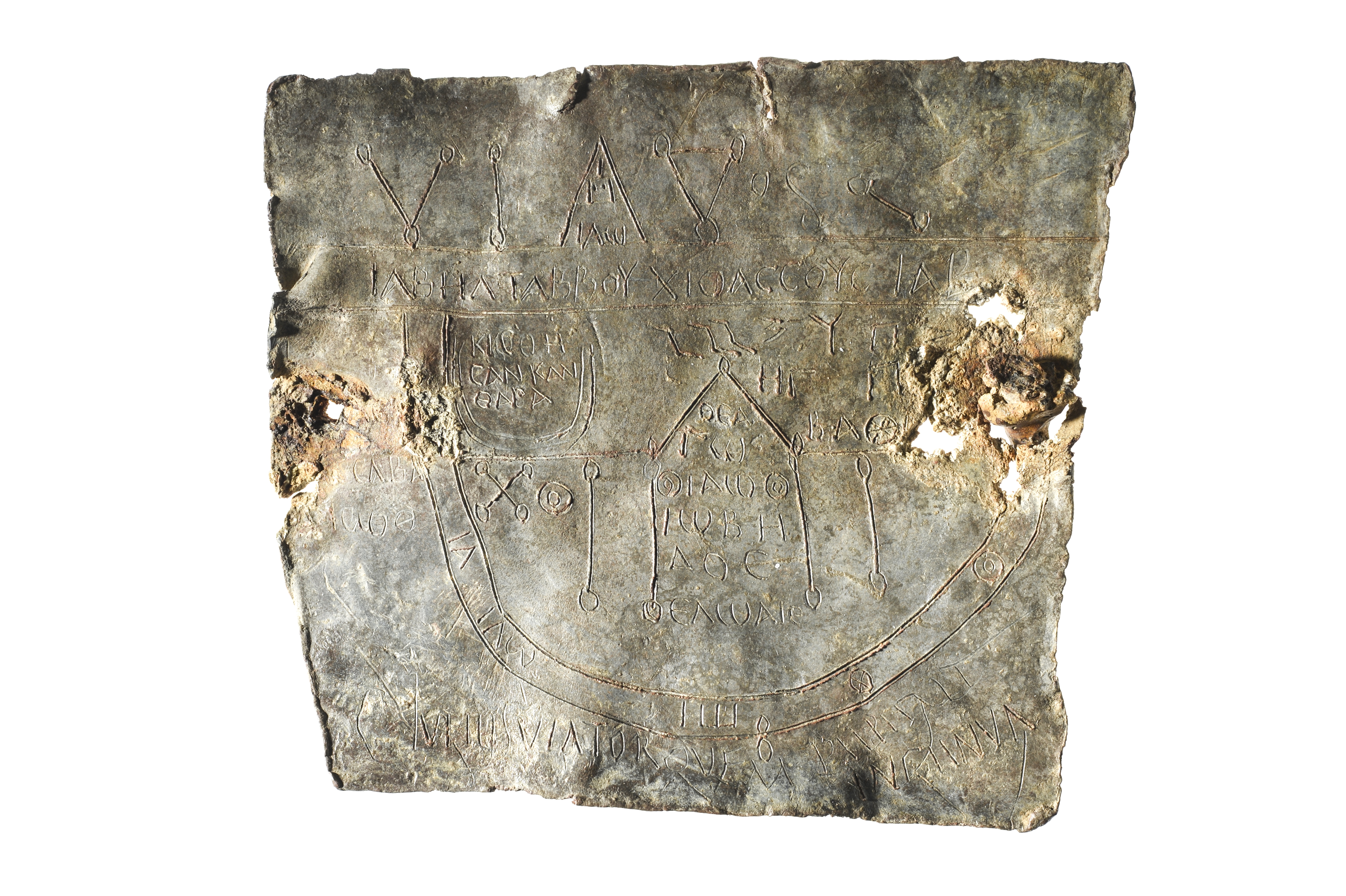
Roman curse tablet with voces mysticae in Greek. The name of the target, Caius Iulius Viator, was added in Latin. Found in Tongeren (Belgium), 70-100 CE, Gallo-Roman Museum (Tongeren).

Voces mysticae are words not immediately recognizable as belonging to any known language, and are commonly associated with curse tablets. Anthropologist Stanley J. Tambiah proposed in 1968 that such words were intended to represent "the language that demons can understand".

Scholars from antiquity, like Christian philosopher Clement of Alexandria (ca. 200 CE), believed that human language was not appropriate for addressing the gods. Therefore, some of the inscriptions of these curse tablets are not easily translatable, because they were "invocations and secret names" which would only be understood by the spirits themselves. Another possibility is that curse tablets were produced by professionals who wished to lend their art a degree of mystique through the use of an apparently secret language that only they could understand. In support of this theory, at least some tablets appear to have blank spaces instead of a name for the target, suggesting they were prepared in advance, and that the desired target's name would be added on behalf of the customer.

The element of mystique was given through a number of ways along with voces mysticae. Professionals and laypeople alike would utilize palindromes as well as boustrophedon. Pictures and charakteres gave further allure to the tablets, and occasionally specific formulae would be used and reused to relay a specifically intended tone. There were also frequent invocations of Egyptian gods and goddesses, archangels, and other biblical figures as a result of the syncretism that occurred over time throughout the Mediterranean.

== Historiography ==
The Greco-Roman society believed in using magic to control the natural world. This practice was common among all members of society, irrespective of their economic or social status. Approximately 1,600 curse tablets have been discovered, most of which are inscribed in Greek. Notably, 220 of these tablets were found in Attica.

The first set of curse tablets to be discovered came from the city of Selinus in Sicily. A total of twenty-two tablets were found, mostly coming from the early fifth century, and directed toward someone that the user was suing. While the ancient Greeks may have feared the power of these tablets, some historians have compared the tablets to modern swearing, arguing that they were produced in a fit of anger, in envy towards a business competitor or athletic opponent, or in an unhealthy obsession toward a person of romantic interest.

When research first began on the topic of curse tablets, there was serious doubt that these types of artifacts truly came from ancient Greek society. E. R. Dodds, a professor of Greek at Oxford, was one of the first scholars to begin studying the topic of magic or superstition in ancient Greece, and others such as Peter Green have also studied this aspect of ancient Greek society.

== Erotic magic ==
The use of erotic curses became especially popular during the Hellenistic period of Mediterranean history. Scholars have debated the possible motivations for using erotic magic, including unrequited love, sexual control of the intended target, financial gain, and social advancement. The love spells used were similar in design around the Mediterranean world, and could be adjusted to different situations, users and intended victims. One notable type of curse was a "Diakopai", a separation spell intended to drive away rivals by making them repulsive. Another type of curse was an "Agogai", a spell that was intended to bind its target to oneself. Recent scholarship has shown that women used curse tablets for erotic magic much more than originally thought, although they were still in a minority.

There is also debate over the type of women that men were trying to attract with these spells. Some scholars subscribe to the idea of men trying to make fair, chaste women become filled with desire for them, while others argue that men were trying to control women whom they thought to be sexually active for their own personal benefit. Christopher A. Faraone considered the spells to fall into two distinct categories; spells used for inducing passion and spells used for encouraging affection. Men, according to Faraone, were the primary users of the passion-inducing spells, while women were the main users of the affection spells.

== See also ==
- Ancient Jewish magic
- Ephesia Grammata
- Execration texts
- Greek Magical Papyri
- Magic in the Greco-Roman world
- Mandaic lead rolls
- Pella curse tablet
- Pydna curse tablets
- Spell bowls

== Bibliography ==
- Adams, Geoff W (2006), "The social and cultural implications of curse tablets [defixiones] in Britain and on the Continent", Studia Humaniora Tartuensia, 7.A.5: 1–15.
- Ankarloo, Bengt and Stuart Clark (1999), Witchcraft and Magic in Europe, Volume 2: Ancient Greece and Rome, Philadelphia, PA: University of Pennsylvania Press.
- Audollent, A. (1904), Defixionum tabellae, Paris. Guide no. 756.
- Bailliot, Magali (2024). L’iconographie des tablettes de malédiction. Envoûter et dessiner dans l’Antiquité gréco-romaine [The iconography of curse tablets. Spellcraft and drawing in Greco-Roman antiquity]. BAR International Series, volume 3197. Oxford, ISBN 978-1-4073-6183-3.
- Baker, K. (2003), 'Greco-Roman Curses: Curse Tablets', History of Magick
- Dickie, Matthew W. "Who Practiced Love-Magic in Antiquity and in the Late Roman World?" The Classical Quarterly 50 (2000): 563–83.
- Eidinow, E., Oracles, Curses and Risk Among the Ancient Greeks, Oxford: Oxford University Press, 2007.
- Faraone, Christopher A (1991), "The Agonistic Context of Early Greek Binding Spells", in Faraone, Christopher A; Obbink, Dirk (eds.), Magika Hiera: ancient Greek magic and religion, Oxford University Press, pp. 3–32.
- ——— (1999), Ancient Greek Love Magic, Cambridge, MA and London: Harvard University Press.
- Gager, John G, ed. (1992), Curse tablets and binding spells from the ancient world, New York: Oxford University Press.
- Graf, Fritz. "Die Religion der Romer: Eine Einfuhrung; Magic in the Roman World: Pagans, Jews, and Christians." The Journal of Religion 83 (2003): 496–9.
- Jordan, David R (2002), "Remedium amoris: A Curse from Cumae in the British Museum", Ancient Journeys: Festschrift for Eugene Lane (PDF).
- ——— (1975), "A Curse Tablet from a Well in the Athenian Agora", ZPE, 19: 245.
- ——— (1985), "A Survey of Greek Defixiones not Included in the Special Corpora", GRBS, 26: 151–97.
- Kotansky, Roy, Greek Magical Amulets: the inscribed gold, silver, copper and bronze lamellae (Part I: Published Texts of Known Provenance), Papyrologica Coloniensia 22/1, Opladen: Westdeutscher Verlag, 1994.
- Kropp, Amina (2008). Defixiones: ein aktuelles corpus lateinischer Fluchtafeln: dfx. Speyer, Germany: Kartoffeldruck-Verlag Kai Broderson. ISBN 978-3-939526-02-5. Contains Latin texts of all known, legible curse tablets as of 2008, with references for each.
- Ogden, Daniel (1999), "Binding Spells: Curse Tablets and Voodoo Dolls in the Greek and Roman Worlds", in Ankarloo, Bengt; Clark, Stuart (eds.), In Witchcraft and Magic in Europe: Ancient Greece and Rome, Philadelphia: University of Pennsylvania Press, pp. 3–90.
- ——— (2000), "Gendering Magic", The Classical Review, 50 (2): 476–78, doi:10.1093/cr/50.2.476.
- Tomlin, Roger (1988), Tabellae Sulis: Roman inscribed tablets of tin and lead from the sacred spring at Bath, Oxford.
- Tomlin, Roger (2005), Curse Tablets of Roman Britain, et al, Oxford: Oxford University.
- Tremel, Jan (2004). Magica Agonistica. Fluchtafeln im antiken Sport [Magica Agonistica. Curse tablets in ancient sport]. Nikephoros supplementary volume 10. Hildesheim: Olms, ISBN 3-615-00294-6.
- Versnel, Henk (1991), "Beyond Cursing: The Appeal to Justice in Judicial Prayers", in Faraone, Christopher A; Obbink, Dirk (eds.), Magika Hiera: ancient Greek magic and religion, Oxford University Press, pp. 60–106
- Wünsch, R. ed. (1897), Defixionum tabellae, Berlin. IG iii.3. Appendix.
- Further Bibliography on Cursing, UK: RDG, archived from the original on August 15, 2004 (dead site, link is to Internet Archive)
