= Charaktêres =

Letter-shaped signs used as magic in ancient literary documents

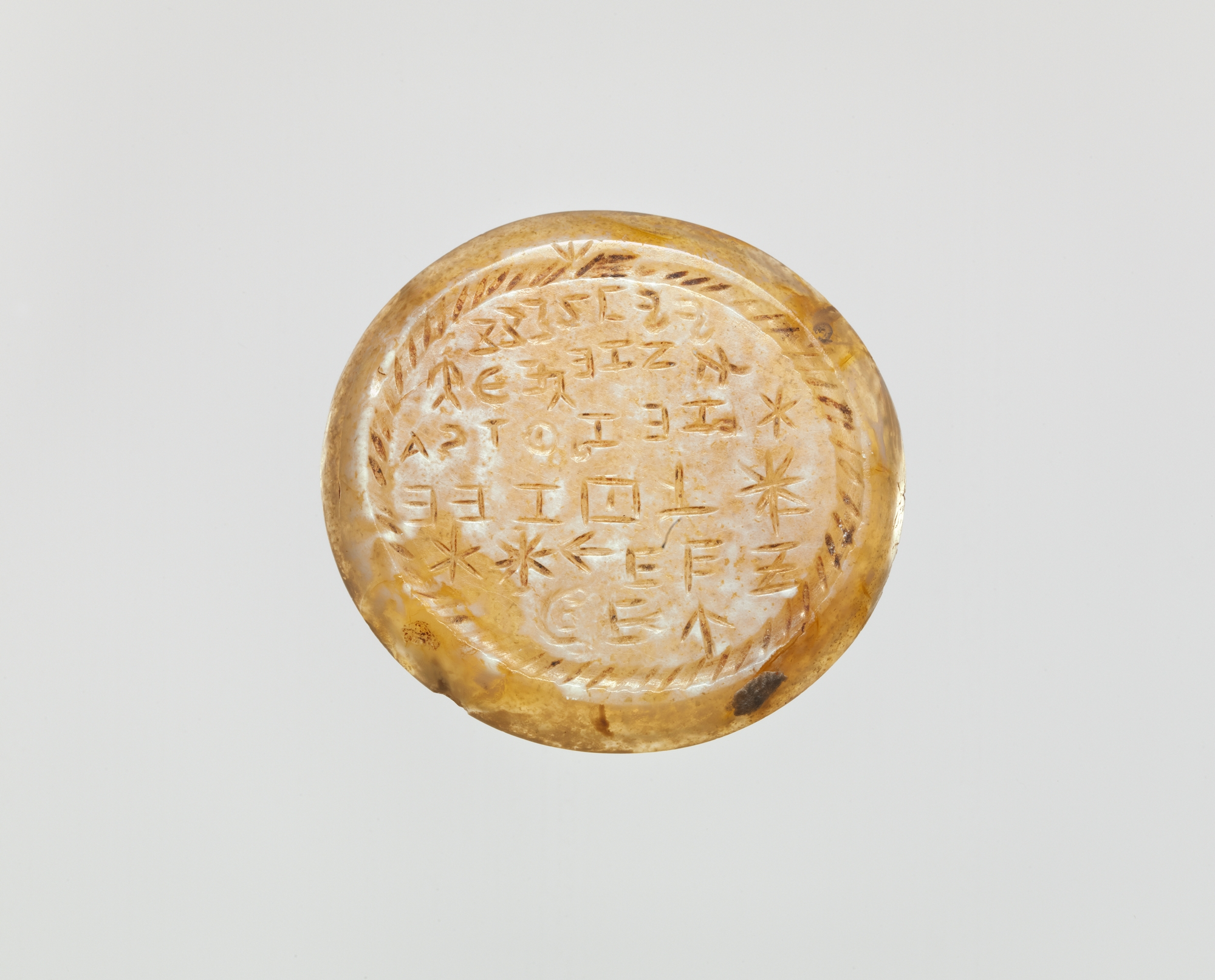
An onyx intaglio in The Met with charaktêres alongside Greek letters

Charaktêres (singular: charaktêr) are letter-shaped signs lacking both semantic and phonetic correlations, which were used as magic signs in ancient literary documents.

== Forms and use ==
In her 2013 thesis Kirsten Dzwiza studied 94 magical texts and recorded 699 different charaktêres occurring over 943 times. The character forms are mostly nonsensical and may include ring-letters, balls, points, closed elements, separate strokes, linear elements, small element, and hieroglyphs. The most common forms consist of asterisks and configurations of straight lines with small circles at their ends.

The signs appear mostly on apotropaic spells and phylacteries, but also on a few ancient curse tablets. They may appear as loose groups of characters on a magical gemstone or spell to large groups alongside other figures on a magical text or table. They are often used alongside comprehensible arcane words, like the voces magicae in the texts of the Greek Magical Papyri. Charaktêres were not intended as an alternative-alphabet or code - they were usually used only once or twice in the context of a single spell.

== See also ==
- Magic in the Greco-Roman world
