= Magic word =

Word or phrase said to cause magical events

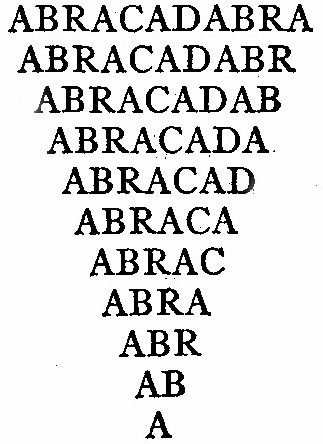
The magic word abracadabra written in a triangle

Magic words are phrases used in fantasy fiction or by stage magicians. Frequently such words are presented as being part of a divine, adamic, or other secret or empowered language. Certain comic book heroes use magic words to activate their powers.

Craig Conley, a scholar of magic, writes that the magic words used by conjurers may originate from "pseudo-Latin phrases, nonsense syllables, or esoteric terms from religious antiquity", but that what they have in common is "language as an instrument of creation".

Easter eggs and cheats in computer games and other software can be seen as a form of magic word, and the word please is sometimes described to children as "the magic word" for its important social effect.

== Invocations of magic ==
Examples of traditional and modern magic words include:

- Abracadabra – magic word used by magicians.
- Ajji Majji la Tarajji – Iranian magic word (Persian).
- Alakazam – a phrase used by magicians.
- Chhu Montor Chhu – a phrase used by magicians in Bangladesh.
- Hocus pocus – a phrase used by magicians.
- Jantar Mantar Jadu Mantar – a phrase used by magicians in India.
- Jiji ru lüling – a standard Taoist magic phrase.
- Čáry, máry, fuk – a Czech magic phrase.
- Presto chango or Hey Presto – used by magicians (probably intended to suggest "quick change").

=== Magic words in fiction ===
- Anál nathrach, orth’ bháis's bethad, do chél dénmha – used by Merlin as the Charm of Making in the 1981 film Excalibur.
- Ala Peanut Butter Sandwiches – used by The Amazing Mumford on Sesame Street.
- Ananasakäämä - originally from the Finnish live-action comedy film Pekka ja Pätkä sammakkomiehinä ("Pekka and Pätkä as frogmen"), used later by magician Timo Kulmakko appearing as Timo Taikuri ("Timo Magician") on Pikku Kakkonen.
- Azarath Metrion Zinthos, used by Raven in the DC Comics series Teen Titans, its 2003 TV series and its cartoon spin-off Teen Titans Go!.
- Bibbidi-Bobbidi-Boo – used by Cinderella's Fairy Godmother.
- Boom Zahramay, a saying used in the Nickelodeon preschool show Shimmer and Shine.
- By the Power of Grayskull, I HAVE THE POWER – used by the Prince Adam, of He-Man and the Masters of the Universe, to transform him into He-Man.
- Cei-u – used by the DC Comics superhero, Johnny Thunder, to summon Thunderbolt.
- Fus Ro Dah – used as a shout by those with the Voice in the Elder Scrolls video game series.
- Hex! Hex! – used by Bibi Blocksberg in the popular German children's audio drama series, called Bibi Blocksberg and Bibi and Tina.
- Ippity pippity pow - used by Winsome Witch, a character from the Hanna-Barbera series The Atom Ant/Secret Squirrel Show.
- Izzy wizzy, let's get busy – Used on The Sooty Show when using Sooty's magic wand.
- Jokeri pokeri box - "Joker poker box", used by magician Simo Aalto.
- Joshikazam – used by Josh Nichols, a character from the popular Nickelodeon show Drake & Josh.
- Klaatu barada nikto – A phrase used in the 1951 film The Day the Earth Stood Still. While not intended as magical words in that film, they were used as such as a parody in Army of Darkness.
- Mecca lecca hi, mecca hiney ho – Jambi on Pee-wee's Playhouse.
- Meeska, Mooska, Mickey Mouse – used on the children's TV series Mickey Mouse Clubhouse to make the Clubhouse appear.
- Niat ingsun mateg aji semar ngising – used in the 1961 film Ali Baba Bujang Lapok as an incantation to open a cave door.
- Oo ee oo ah ah ting tang walla walla bing bang, phrase used in song "Witch Doctor" performed by Ross Bagdasarian Sr., and released in 1958 by Liberty Records under the stage name David Seville.
- Kulja Sim Sim – a Hindi and Urdu phrase popularized in 1956 Bollywood film "Alibaba Aur 40 Chor"
- Open sesame – used by the character Ali Baba in the English version of a tale from One Thousand and One Nights.
- Ostagazuzulum – used by the title character, Wizbit, in the British Children's TV series Wizbit.
- Rampung ngising semar tilem – used in the 1961 film Ali Baba Bujang Lapok as an incantation to close a cave door.
- Shazam – used by the comic book hero Billy Batson to change into Captain Marvel.
- Hey, Shadow, remember who you are (Russian: Тень, знай своё место, romanized: Ten, znay svoyo mesto, lit. 'Shadow, know your place') - an incantation used by a scientist in The Shadow to return his lost shadow, who became to live its own life, to its proper place.
- Schwan, kleb an! (literally "Swan, hold fast") - a spell used by the Youngest Brother in the tale "The Magic Swan" in the collection of Ludwig Bechstein. This spell made the people, who touched his magic swan, stick to the latter.
- Shimbaree, Shimbarah, Shimbaree, Shimbarah – used on the children's video and TV series Barney and the Backyard Gang and Barney & Friends.
- Sim Sala Bim – a phrase used by Harry August Jansen a.k.a. Dante The Magician, c. 1940. "Sim Sim Sala Bim" are the magic words said by Hadji on the shows The Adventures of Jonny Quest and The Real Adventures of Jonny Quest. The line was used by Oscar "Oz" Diggs in Oz the Great and Powerful.
- Suolaa, suolaa, enemmän suolaa - "Salt, salt, more salt", used by Nils Hedengren appearing as magician Faqir Kronblom on Sirkus Papukaija.
- Treguna Mekoides Trecorum Satis Dee – the spell for 'Substitutiary Locomotion' in the film Bedknobs and Broomsticks.
- Walla Walla Washington – Bugs Bunny in Looney Tunes.
- Wiggle Waggle – Greg Page in The Wiggles.
- Yo Gabba Gabba – DJ Lance Rock in Yo Gabba Gabba!.
- Zotz – used by the professor character to make an ancient amulet perform deeds in Zotz!.

== See also ==
- Barbarous name – Meaningless word used in magic rituals
- Incantation
- Kotodama
- Mantra
