= Serenus Sammonicus =

Roman savant and tutor to Geta and Caracalla

- Born: c. 2nd century AD; Pergamon (modern-day Bergama, İzmir, Turkey)
- Died: 212 AD
- Occupations: Physician; Tutor

Serenus Sammonicus (died 212) was a Roman savant and tutor to Geta and Caracalla who became fatally involved in politics; he is often confused with the author of the didactic medical poem, Liber Medicinalis ("The Medical Book"; also known as De medicina praecepta saluberrima), probably incomplete in the extant form, as well as many lost works.

== Works and influence ==
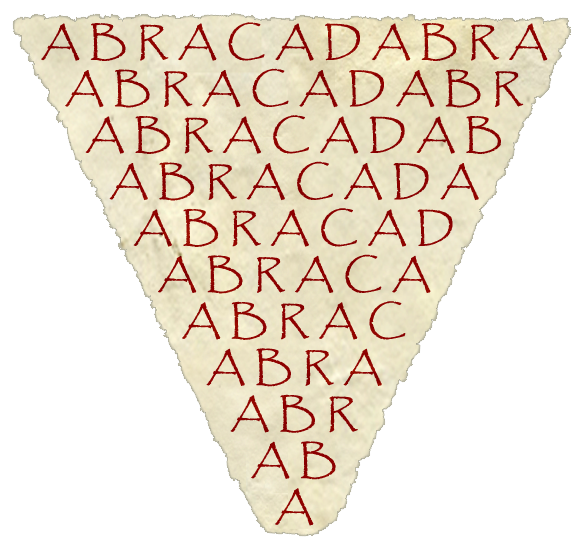
Serenus Sammonicus advocated the use of abracadabra as a literary amulet against fever

Serenus was "a typical man of letters in an Age of Archaism and a worthy successor to Marcus Cornelius Fronto and Aulus Gellius, one whose social rank and position is intimately bound up with the prevailing passion for grammar and a mastery of ancient lore". According to Macrobius, who referenced his work for his Saturnalia, he was "the learned man of his age". Maurus Servius Honoratus and Arnobius both employed his erudition to their own ends. He possessed a library of 60,000 volumes.

His most quoted work was Res reconditae, in at least five books, of which fragments only are preserved in quotations. The surviving work, De medicina praecepta, in 1115 hexameters, contains a number of popular remedies, borrowed from Pliny the Elder and Pedanius Dioscorides, and various magic formulae, amongst others the famous abracadabra, as a cure for fever and ague. It concludes with a description of the famous antidote of Mithridates VI of Pontus.

It was much used in the Middle Ages, and is of value for the ancient history of popular medicine. The syntax and metre are remarkably correct. According to the unreliable Augustan History he was a famous physician and polymath, who was put to death with other friends of Geta in December 212, at a banquet to which he had been invited by Caracalla shortly after the assassination of his brother.

The first printed edition of De medicina praecepta was edited by Giovanni Sulpizio da Veroli, before 1484.

== See also ==
- History of medicine

== Sources ==
- August Baur, Quaestiones Sammoniceae (Giessen, 1886)
- Martin Schanz, Geschichte der römischen Literatur, iii. (1896)
- Teuffel, History of Roman Literature (Eng. trans., 1900), 374, 4, and 383.
