= Barbarous name =

Meaningless word used in magic rituals

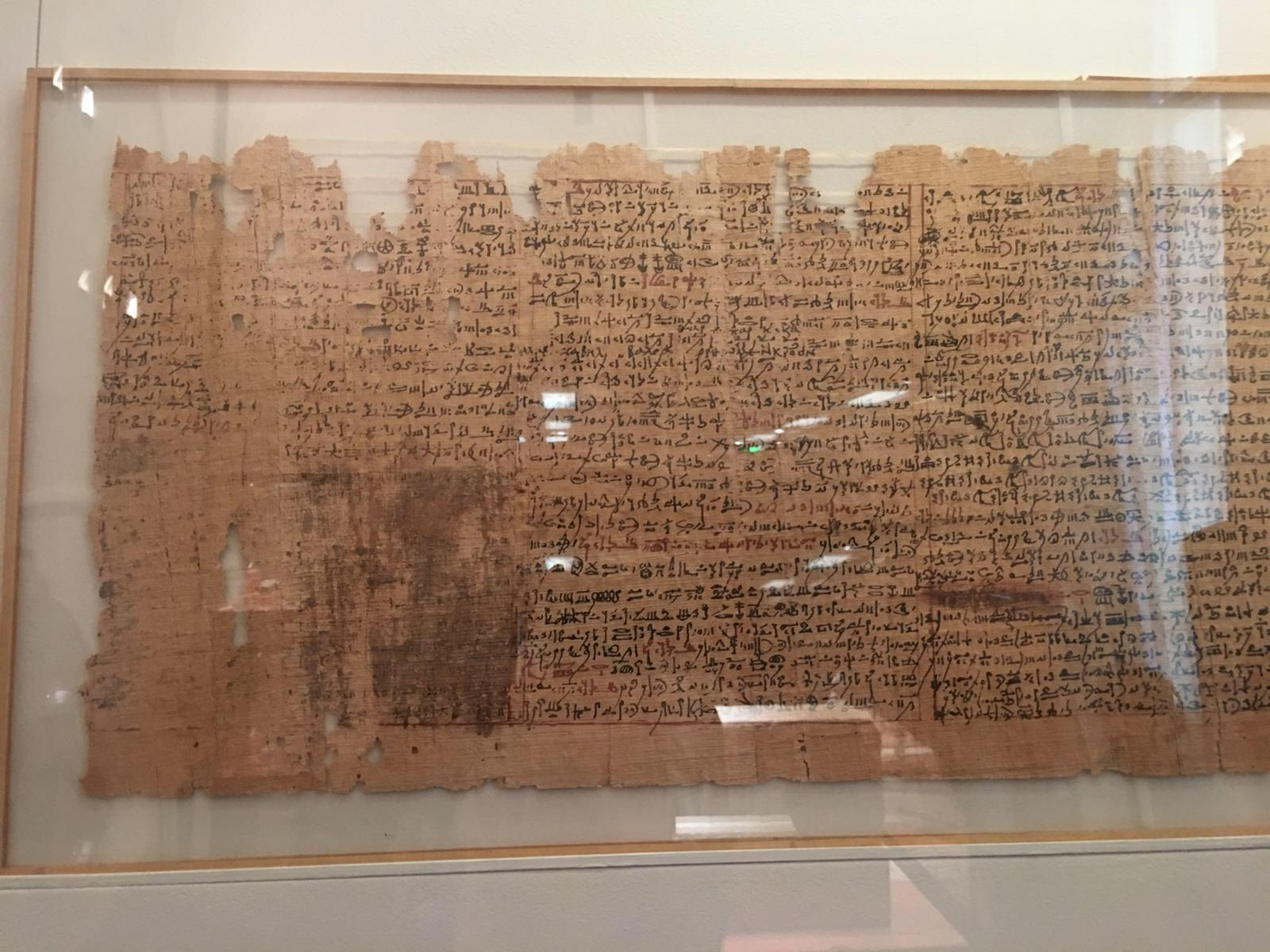
Greek Magical Papyri on display at the Louvre

A barbarous name (Latin: nomen barbarum; pl. nomina barbara) is a meaningless (or seemingly meaningless) word used in magic rituals. The term barbarous comes from the Greek barbaroi (Ancient Greek: βάρβαροι), meaning one to whom a pure Greek dialect is not native; one who is not a proper Greek, (barbarians). Often these names were derived from foreign sources and acquired their "barbarous" nature from the magician's lack of understanding of that language.

Many ancient barbarous names were of Egyptian origin, though there were plenty of Hebrew and Persian names that were corrupted by transcription into Greek. They appear throughout the Greek Magical Papyri, a notable example being "ablanathanalba".

Iamblichus discusses barbarous names, warning magicians not to translate them even if their original meaning is discovered, due to the belief that the power of the names resided in their sound, not their meaning. The term also appears in the Chaldean Oracles.

By the medieval period most were from Greek and Hebrew sources, such as "anexhexeton". Gemistus Pletho censored references to barbarous names (as well as Christianity) in Michael Psellos's copy of the Chaldean Oracles.

The Enochian language of John Dee and Edward Kelley introduced a variety of barbarous names to modern magical practice.

In the modern era, Aleister Crowley, like Iamblichus before him, argued that the supposed effectiveness of barbarous names rested in their utterance, not their meaning.

== See also ==
- Abracadabra
- Abrahadabra
- Astrotheology
- Magical formula
- Magic word – Word or phrase said to cause magical events
