= Ephesia Grammata =

Ancient Greek magical formula

Ephesia Grammata (Greek: Ἐφέσια Γράμματα, "Ephesian Letters"), also known as Ephesia alexipharmaca, are Ancient Greek magical formulae attested from the 5th or 4th century BC. They appear in epigraphic sources and literary testimonia.

According to Pausanias the Lexicographer (Eust. ad Od. 20, 247, p. 1864), the statue of Artemis at Ephesus appears to have had Ephesia Grammata indistinctly inscribed on its feet, girdle and crown.

Clement of Alexandria considers them an invention of the Daktyloi. They were "meaningless words" (ἄσημα ὀνόματα) potent to protect those who could speak them correctly, their power residing in their sound, so that they were ineffective if mispronounced.

In his Quaestiones Convivales, Plutarch reports that Magi instructed those believed to be possessed to recite the Ephesian letters.

In the 4th century comedy Lyropoios by Anaxilas, one character carries Ephesia Grammata inscribed on his belt.

The best known Ephesia Grammata are a group of six words:

ΑΣΚΙ(ΟΝ) ΚΑΤΑΣΚΙ(ΟΝ) ΛΙΞ ΤΕΤΡΑΞ ΔΑΜΝΑΜΕΝΕΥΣ ΑΙΣΙΟΝ (or ΑΙΣΙΑ)
aski(on) kataski(on) lix tetrax damnameneus aision (aisia)

A version of this formula seems to be attested by a damaged inscription from Himera, Sicily, which must date to before the Carthaginian destruction of the city in 409 BC. The next earliest epigraphic evidence for the formula comes from the 4th century BC, and it continues to re-appear on magical papyri throughout the Hellenistic period. The words sometimes occur in significantly different variants, for example on the lead tablet of Phalasarna, Crete:

ασκι κατασκι αασιαν ενδασιαν
aski kataski aasian endasian

There were various attempts by ancient authors to make sense of the words. Damnameneus was interpreted as the name of a Dactyl. Androcydes proposed an interpretation as philosophical symbols (Clement, Stromata 5, 8, 45, 2): aski (ἄσκιον "shadowless") as "darkness", kataski (κατάσκιον "shadowy") as "brightness" (brightness being necessary in order to cast shadows), lix (Hsch.: "λίξ: πλάγιος, καὶ λίθος πλατύς") as an ancient term for "Earth", and tetrax (τετραξός "fourfold") as the year (the four seasons), Damnameneus as "Sun" and aisia (αἴσιος "right, fitting, auspicious") as Logos.

The Suda describes the Ephesian letters as certain spells that are difficult to understand. They are said to have been spoken by King Croesus while on his funeral pyre (who was said to have been miraculously saved from the pyre through the use of these spells). An anecdote recounts that at Olympia, during a wrestling match between a Milesian and an Ephesian, the Milesian was unable to wrestle because the Ephesian had the Ephesian letters bound around his ankle. When this became apparent and the letters were removed, the Ephesian immediately fell repeatedly.

== See also ==
- Voces magicae
- Charaktêres
