= Abracadabra =

Magic word

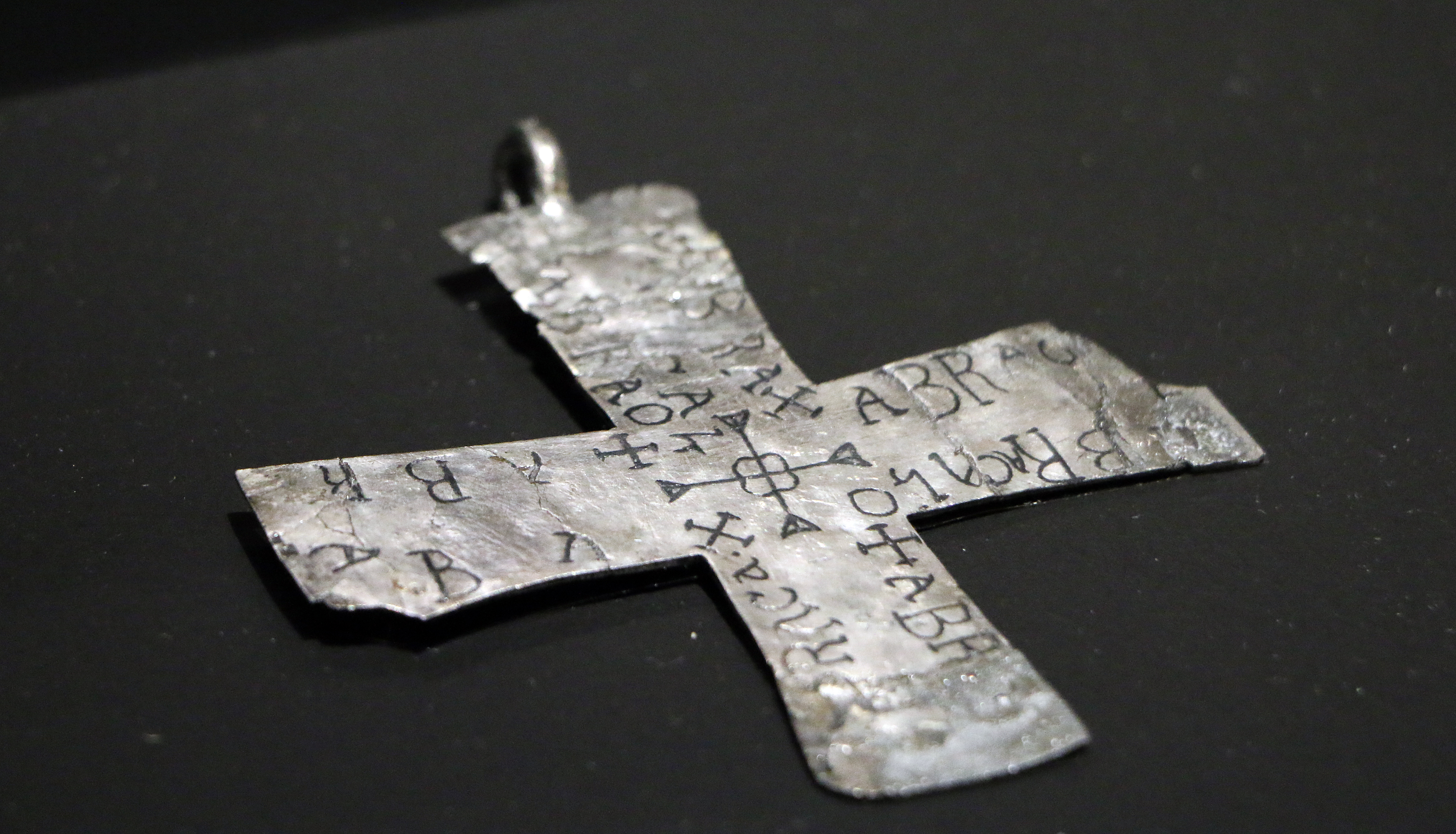
A silver talisman from the 6th or 7th century, inscribed with words similar to abracadabra

Abracadabra is a magic word, historically used as an apotropaic incantation on amulets and common today in stage magic. The actual origin is unknown, but one of the first appearances of the word was in a second-century work by Roman physician Serenus Sammonicus.

== Etymology ==
Pronunciation
Male native of Poland pronouncing Abracadabra

Abracadabra is of unknown origin, and is first attested in a second-century work of Serenus Sammonicus relating to a cure for a fever.

Some conjectural etymologies are: from a phrase in Aramaic that means "I create like the word" (אברא כדברא), to etymologies that point to similar words in Latin and Greek such as abraxas or to its similarity to the first four letters of the Greek alphabet (alpha-beta-gamma-delta or ΑΒΓΔ). However, according to the Oxford English Dictionary, "no documentation has been found to support any of the various conjectures".

The historian Don Skemer suggests that it might originate from the Hebrew phrase ha brachah dabarah (name of the blessed), said to be a magical phrase.

The Aramaic linguist Steve Caruso argues that Abracadabra cannot be Aramaic, and suggests that the popularisation of the mistaken etymology is a result of an extended discussion on an early internet message board, which credits rabbi Lawrence Kushner with publishing a modern etymology.

== History ==
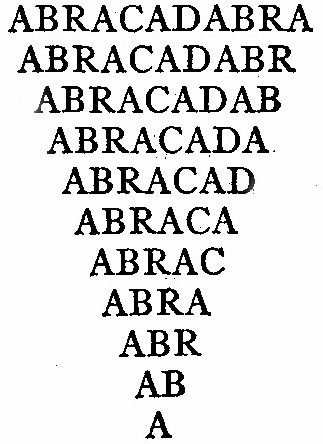
Abracadabra written in a triangular form as represented in Encyclopædia Britannica

The first known mention of the word was in the second century AD in a book called Liber Medicinalis (sometimes known as De Medicina Praecepta Saluberrima) by Serenus Sammonicus, physician to the Roman emperor Caracalla, who in chapter 52 prescribed that malaria sufferers wear an amulet containing Abracadabra written in the form of a triangle.

The power of the amulet, he claimed, makes lethal diseases go away. Other Roman emperors, including Geta and Severus Alexander, were followers of the medical teachings of Serenus Sammonicus and may have used the incantation as well.

It was used as a magical formula by the Gnostics of the sect of Basilides in invoking the aid of beneficent spirits against disease and misfortune. It is found on Abraxas stones, which were worn as amulets. Subsequently, its use spread beyond the Gnostics.

To use it, when a person was sick and unhealthy they would wear an amulet around their neck that was made up of a piece of parchment inscribed with a triangular formula derived from this. It was believed that when it was written out this way that it acted like a funnel and drove the sickness out of the body.

A Jewish codex from 16th century Italy titled Ets ha-Da’at (The Tree of Knowledge) and described as a collection of magical spells contains the word Abracadabra, referring to an amulet. It was described as a "cure from heavens" for "all sorts of fever[s]", consumption, and fire.

The Puritan minister Increase Mather dismissed the word as bereft of power. Daniel Defoe wrote dismissively about Londoners who posted the word on their doorways to ward off sickness during the Great Plague of London.

In the early 1800s, the word was used as an example of what magicians would say. Abracadabra is now more commonly used in the performance of stage magic as a magic word at the culmination of a trick.

Aleister Crowley adapted the word Abracadabra into the word Abrahadabra in The Book of the Law, the central sacred text of Thelema.

== See also ==
- Avada Kedavra — Spell from the Harry Potter series
- Barbarous name – Meaningless word used in magic rituals
- Hocus-pocus – Magic phrase
- Open sesame – Magical phrase in the story of "Ali Baba and the Forty Thieves"
- Sator Square – Roman-era word square with a Latin palindrome
