= Sirkus Papukaija =

Finnish children's television series

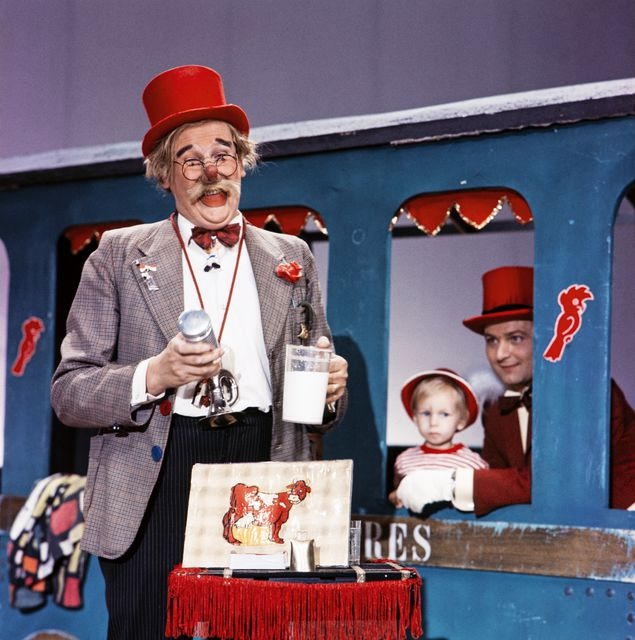
Faqir Kronblom and Orvo Kontio.

Sirkus Papukaija (Finnish for Circus Parrot), later simply Papukaija, is a Finnish children's TV show shown on Yle's channel from 1961 to 1967. The show was shown every other Sunday, and it involved numerous "parrot clubs" in various Finnish municipalities. The show spawned the popular catchphrase "10 pistettä ja papukaijamerkki" ("10 points and a parrot badge"), which is used to congratulate someone on a correct answer, and is so popular that even people who have never heard of the show use it in everyday conversation.

The show was the first magazine-style children's show, and starred figures such as Postikaija Pete, whom children could send drawings to, the ringmaster/editor Orvo Kontio, the magician Faqir Kronblom (Nils Hedengren), who had the magic words "salt, salt, more salt", Professor Hajamieli (Martti Varpama) and Onni the Clown (Onni Gideon Tervonen), whose trousers and shoes defined the clown image for Finnish children.

== Miscellanea ==
The Finnish equivalent of Wikipedia barnstars is named "papukaijamerkki" after this show.
