= Androcydes (Pythagorean) =

Androcydes (Ancient Greek: Ἀνδροκύδης) was a Pythagorean whose work On Pythagorean Symbols survives only in scattered fragments. The dating of his life is uncertain; he lived before the 1st century BC but possibly as early as the 4th. The frequency with which Androcydes is mentioned in other works indicates that he was a major source for the later Pythagorean tradition, and he is also of interest in studying the historical development of the literary and philosophical symbol.

== The Pythagorean symbols ==
Walter Burkert featured Androcydes in his stemma of Pythagorean symbola, consisting of gnomic utterances or maxims. Androcydes was regarded as one of the most important sources on the akousmata.

According to Grant (2002), he has said, wine and meat do harm the mind.

Paraphrases of his work in later writers demonstrate his method of interpreting these behavioral strictures. For instance, “Do not step over a yoke” should be understood as meaning “Do not transgress justice.” These interpretations indicate that the prohibitions held arcane significance for those willing to ponder them and learn, that the symbola are also enigmata (αἰνίγματα).

The 1st-century BC grammarian Tryphon refers to Androcydes’ work in a section on literary enigmata, which he defines as darkened or obscured allegories. Tryphon implies that Androcydes made no strong distinction between poetic and philosophical modes of discourse, in that he cited passages from Hesiod in interpreting the Pythagorean symbols.

== The symbols and magic ==
Androcydes treated the Ephesia grammata, or ritualized “magic words” used for incantations or amuletic inscriptions, as allegorical language containing theological insights, a “cryptic form of natural theology.” Androcydes interprets the words through perceived lexical and phonic similarities to Greek. His commentary on perhaps the best-known string of such syllables — askion kataskion lix tetrax damnameneus aision — is paraphrased by Clement of Alexandria:

Androcydes … says that the famous so-called Ephesian letters are ordered as allegories: askion signifies ‘darkness’, because darkness throws no shadow (skia); kataskion signifies ‘light’, since it casts shadow with its light (kataugazei); lix is an old word meaning ‘the earth’; tetrax means the ‘year’, because of the (four) seasons; damnameneus means the Sun, which is overpowering (damazôn); the aisia means ‘the true voice’. The allegory intimates that divine things have been arranged in due order, for example, darkness in relation to light, sun to create the year, and the earth to make possible every sort of natural coming-into-being.

== The physician? ==
Some attempts have been made to identify this Androcydes with the Androcydes who was physician to Alexander the Great. Pythagorean dietary discipline regarding wine (bad) and cabbage (good) may be reflected in the physician's advice to the notoriously wine-drinking conqueror.
