= Androcydes (physician) =

Androcydes (or Androkydes, fl. 4th century BCE) (Ancient Greek: Ἀνδροκύδης) was a Greek physician and writer at the time of Alexander the Great. According to Pliny, he advised Alexander to moderate his drinking:

Androcydes, a man famous for his wisdom, wrote to Alexander the Great, with the view of putting a check on his intemperance: 'When you are about to take a drink of wine, O king!' said he, 'remember that you are about to drink the blood of the earth: hemlock is a poison to man, wine a poison to hemlock.' And if Alexander had only followed this advice, he certainly would not have had to answer for slaying his friends in his drunken fits.

Elsewhere, Androcydes is supposed to have recommended cabbage to counteract the effects of wine. Some attempts have been made to identify this Androcydes with the Androcydes who wrote on Pythagoreanism, as the advice regarding wine (bad) and cabbage (good) may reflect Pythagorean dietary discipline.

Androcydes, if the same authority is meant, may not have confined himself to writing on medical topics. He is cited by Athenaeus for an etymology of the Greek word kolax, "flatterer," which is taken by one prosopographer as evidence of his association with Alexander's court.
