= Voces magicae =

Ancient Roman magic words

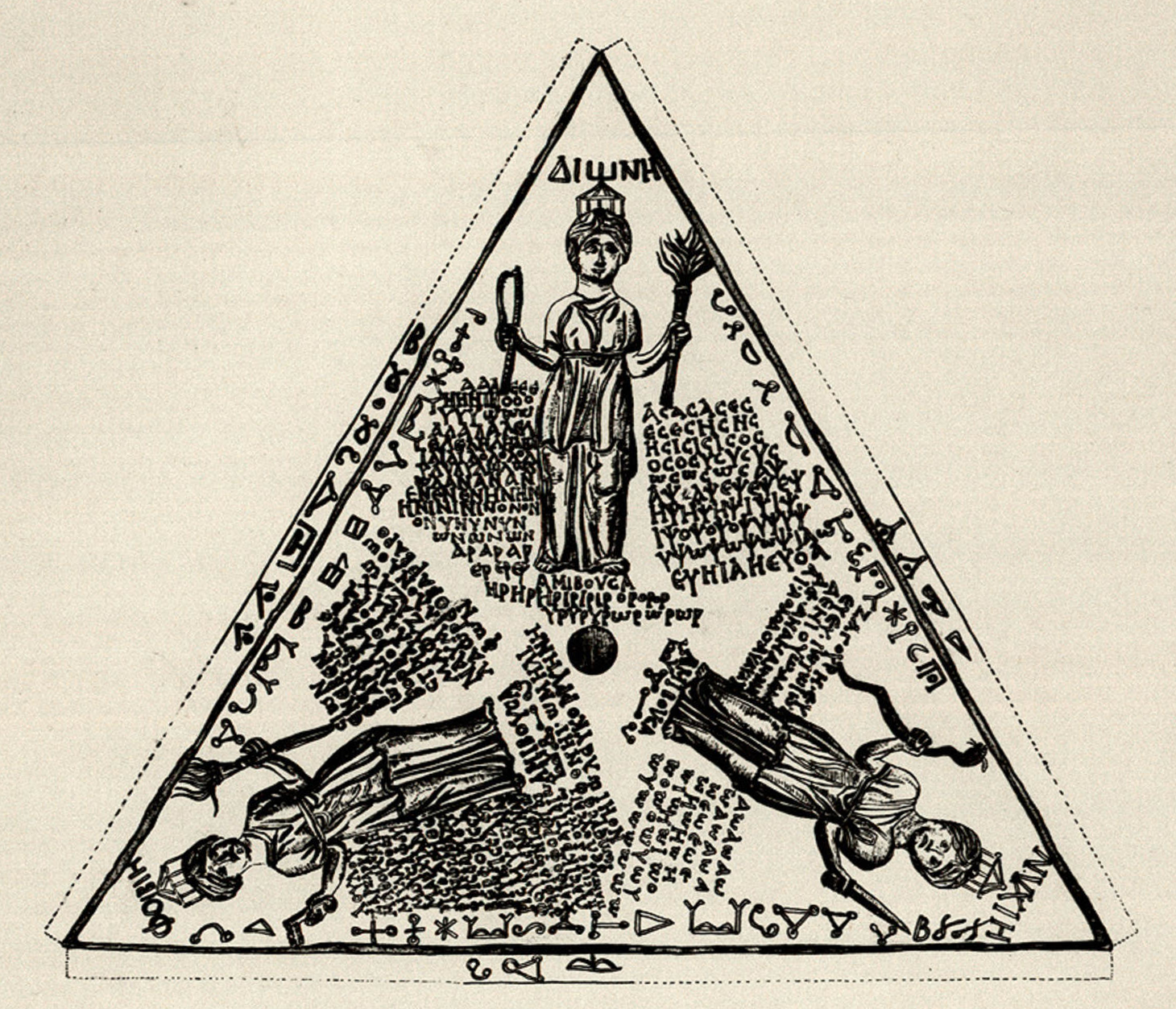
Magic tablet from Pergamon with Greek voces magicae surrounding each of the figures

Voces magicae (singular: vox magica, "magical names" or "magical words") or voces mysticae are pronounceable but incomprehensible magical formulas that occur in spells, charms, curses, and amulets from Classical Antiquity, including Ancient Greece, Egypt, and Rome.

These formulas may include alternative names of gods or other unusual phrases which may have been intended as the secret, authoritative true name of certain gods. As an example: in the Greek Magical Papyri, the first spell of the first papyrus intended to summon a daimon assistant and included the phrase (in translation) "[This] is your authoritative name: ARBATH ARBAOTH BAKCHABRE".

The voces magicae have been said to be related to the Greek Ephesia Grammata.

== See also ==
- Magic in the Greco-Roman world
- Magical formula
- Glossolalia
