= Magic in the Greco-Roman world =

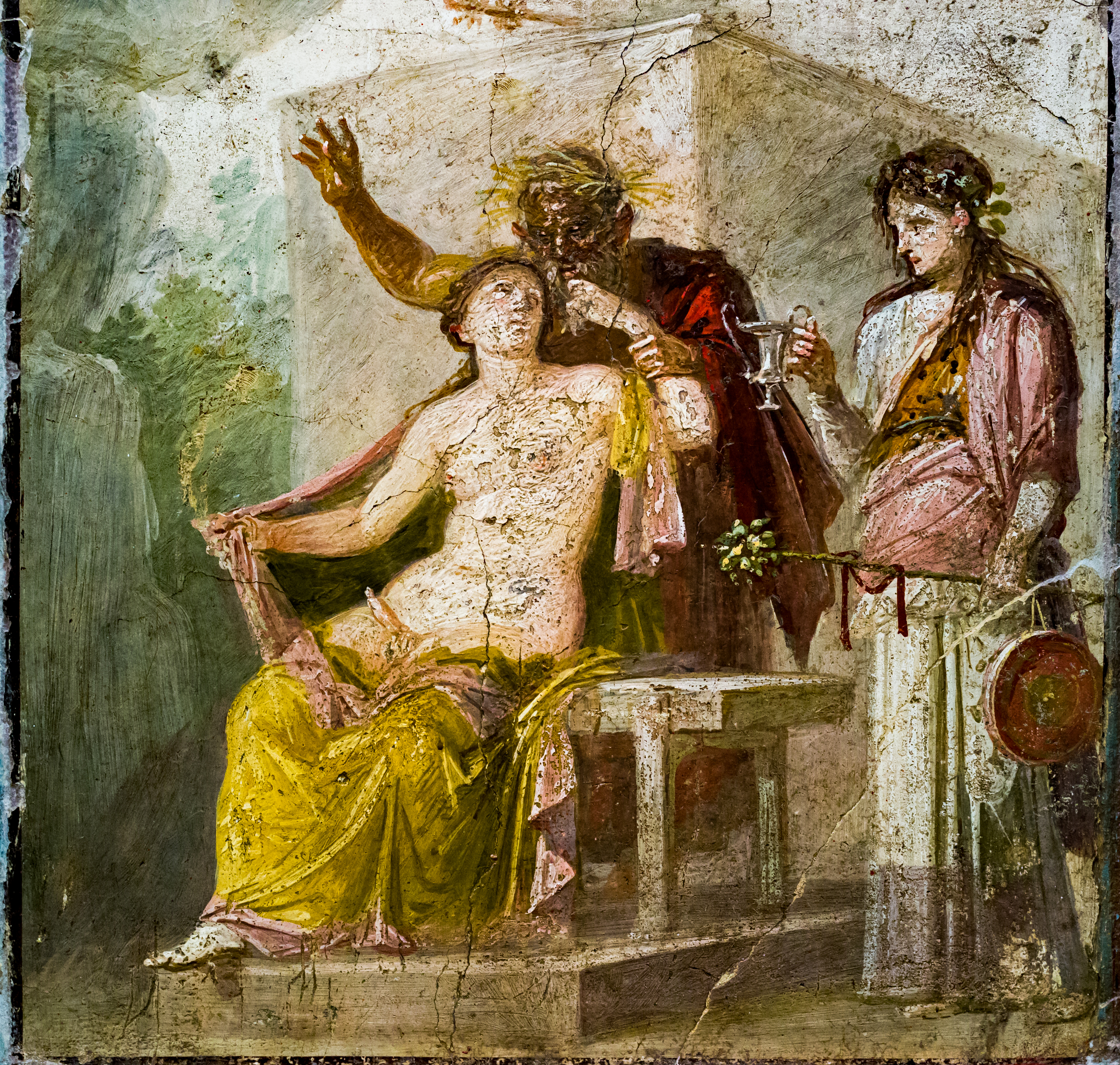
Pompeian wall painting of a hermaphrodite seated in front of an old satyr; a maenad or bacchant brings a love potion.

Magic in the Greco-Roman world – that is, ancient Greece, ancient Rome, and the other cultures with which they interacted, especially ancient Egypt – comprises supernatural practices undertaken by individuals, often privately, that were not under the oversight of official priesthoods attached to the various state, community, and household cults and temples as a matter of public religion. Private magic was practiced throughout Greek and Roman cultures as well as among Jews and early Christians of the Roman Empire. Primary sources for the study of Greco-Roman magic include the Greek Magical Papyri, curse tablets, amulets, and literary texts such as Ovid's Fasti and Pliny the Elder's Natural History.

== Terminology ==
Pervasive throughout the Eastern Mediterranean and Western Asia until late antiquity and beyond, mágos, "Magian" or "magician", was influenced by (and eventually displaced) Greek goēs (γόης), the older word for a practitioner of magic, to include astrology, alchemy and other forms of esoteric knowledge. This association was in turn the product of the Hellenistic fascination for (Pseudo-)Zoroaster, who was perceived by the Greeks to be the "Chaldean", founder of the Magi and inventor of both astrology and magic, a meaning that still survives in the modern-day words "magic" and "magician".

Authors William Swatos and Peter Kivisto define magic as "any attempt to control the environment or the self by means that are either untested or untestable, such as charms or spells."

== General ==
While Herodotus, Xenophon, and Plutarch used magos in connection with their descriptions of Zoroastrian religious beliefs or practices, the majority seem to have understood it in the sense of "magician". Accordingly, the more skeptical writers then also identified the "magicians" – i.e. individual mages – as charlatans or frauds. In Plato's Symposium (202e), the Athenian identified them as maleficent, allowing however a measure of efficacy as a function of the god Eros. Pliny paints them in a particularly bad light.

According to one source magic in general was held in low esteem and condemned by speakers and writers. Betz notes book burnings in regards to texts such as the Greek Magical Papyri, when he cites Ephesus in the Acts of the Apostles (Acts 19: 19). And on the account of Suetonius, Augustus ordered the burning of 2,000 magical scrolls in 13 BCE. Betz states:

As a result of these acts of suppression, the magicians and their literature went underground. The papyri themselves testify to this by the constantly recurring admonition to keep the books secret. [...] The religious beliefs and practices of most people were identical with some form of magic, and the neat distinctions we make today between approved and disapproved forms of religion – calling the former "religion" and "church" and the latter "magic" and "cult" – did not exist in antiquity except among a few intellectuals. It is known that philosophers of the Neopythagorean and Neoplatonic schools, as well as Gnostic and Hermetic groups, used magical books and hence must have possessed copies. But most of their material vanished and what we have left are their quotations.

Albrecht Dieterich noted the importance of the Greek Magical Papyri for the study of ancient religions because most of the texts combine several religions, Egyptian, Greek, or Jewish, among others.

According to Robert Parker, "magic differs from religion as weeds differ from flowers, merely by negative social evaluation"; magic was often seen as consisting of practices that range from silly superstition to the wicked and dangerous. However, magic seems to have borrowed from religion, adopting religious ceremonies and divine names, and the two are sometimes difficult to clearly distinguish. Magic is often differentiated from religion in that it is manipulative rather than supplicatory of the deities. Some mainstream religious rites openly set out to constrain the gods. Other rough criteria sometimes used to distinguish magic from religion include: aimed at selfish or immoral ends; and conducted in secrecy, often for a paying client. Religious rites, on the other hand, are more often aimed at lofty goals such as salvation or rebirth, and are conducted in the open for the benefit of the community or a group of followers.

Religious ritual had the intended purpose of giving a god their just due honor, or asking for divine intervention and favor, while magic is seen as practiced by those who seek only power, and often undertaken based on a false scientific basis. Ultimately, the practice of magic includes rites that do not play a part in worship, and are ultimately irreligious. Associations with this term tend to be an evolving process in ancient literature, but generally speaking ancient magic reflects aspects of broader religious traditions in the Mediterranean world, that is, a belief in magic reflects a belief in deities, divination, and words of power. The concept of magic however came to represent a more coherent and self-reflective tradition exemplified by magicians seeking to fuse varying non-traditional elements of Greco-Roman religious practice into something specifically called magic. This fusing of practices reached its peak in the world of the Roman Empire in the 3rd to 5th centuries CE. Thorndike comments: "Greek science at its best was not untainted by magic".

The magic papyri we have left to study, present more Graeco-Egyptian, rather than Graeco-Roman beliefs. Betz further notes:

In this syncretism, the indigenous ancient Egyptian religion has in part survived, in part been profoundly Hellenized. In its Hellenistic transformation, the Egyptian religion of the pre-Hellenistic era appears to have been reduced and simplified, no doubt to facilitate its assimilation into Hellenistic religion as the predominant cultural reference. It is quite clear that the magicians who wrote and used the Greek papyri were Hellenistic in outlook. Hellenization, however, also includes the Egyptianizing of Greek religious traditions. The Greek magical papyri contain many instances of such Egyptianizing transformations, which take very different forms in different texts or layers of tradition.

== History ==
=== Magic in Homeric times ===
In Greek literature, the earliest magical operation that supports a definition of magic as a practice aimed at trying to locate and control the secret forces (the sympathies and antipathies that make up these forces) of the world (physis φύσις) is found in Book X of the Odyssey (a text stretching back to the early 8th century BCE). Book X describes the encounter of the central hero Odysseus with Circe, "She who is sister to the wizard Aeetes, both being children of the Sun...by the same mother, Perse the daughter of the Ocean," on the island of Aeaea. In the story Circe's magic consists in the use of a wand against Odysseus and his men while Odysseus's magic consists of the use of a secret herb called moly (revealed to him by the god Hermes, "god of the golden wand") to defend himself from her attack. In the story three requisites crucial to the idiom of "magic" in later literature are found:

1. The use of a mysterious tool endowed with special powers (the wand).
2. The use of a rare magical herb. (Note: Pliny in Natural History XXV, 10–12 states his belief that the "origin of botany" was closely aligned with what he saw as the practise of magic, he in fact notes that Medea & Circe were early investigators of plants – and that Orpheus was the first writer on the subject of botany.)
3. A divine figure that reveals the secret of the magical act (Hermes).

These are the three most common elements that characterize magic as a system in the later Hellenistic and greco-Roman periods of history.

Another important definitional element to magic is also found in the story. Circe is presented as being in the form of a beautiful woman (a temptress) when Odysseus encounters her on an island. In this encounter Circe uses her wand to change Odysseus' companions into swine. This may suggest that magic was associated (in this time) with practices that went against the natural order, or against wise and good forces (Circe is called a witch by a companion of Odysseus). In this mode, Circe is representative of a power (the Titans) that had been conquered by the younger Olympian gods such as Zeus, Poseidon and Hades.

=== Magic in Classical Greece ===
The 6th century BCE gives rise to scattered references of magoi at work in Greece. Many of these references representing a more positive conceptualisation of magic. Among the most famous of these Greek magoi, between Homer and the Hellenistic period, are the figures of Orpheus, Pythagoras, and Empedocles.

==== Orpheus ====
Orpheus is a mythical figure, said to have lived in Thrace "a generation before Homer" (though he is in fact depicted on 5th-century ceramics in Greek costume). Orphism, or the Orphic Mysteries, seems also to have been central to the personages of Pythagoras and Empedocles, who lived in the 6th and 5th centuries BCE. Pythagoras for example is said to have described Orpheus as "the...father of melodious songs". Since Aeschylus (the Greek playwright) later describes him as he who "haled all things by the rapture of his voice," this suggests belief in the efficacy of song and voice in magic. Orpheus is certainly associated with a great many deeds, the most famous perhaps being his descent to the underworld to bring back his wife, Eurydice. Orpheus' deeds are not usually condemned or spoken of negatively. This suggests that some forms of magic were more acceptable. Indeed, the term applied to Orpheus to separate him, presumably, from magicians of ill repute is theios aner or 'divine man'.

==== Pythagoras ====
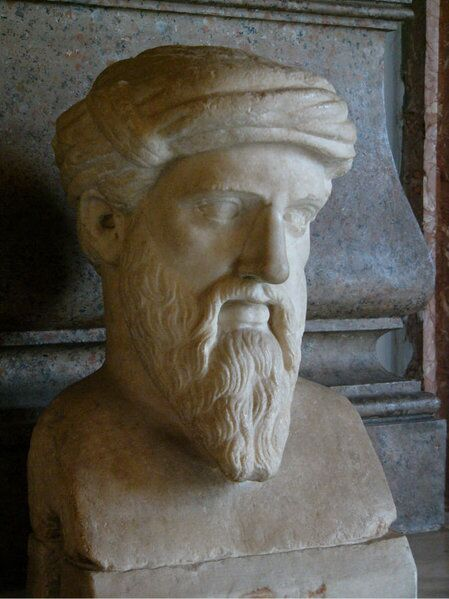
Pythagoras of Samos

Magical powers were also attributed to the famous mathematician and philosopher Pythagoras (c. 570 – 495 BCE), as recorded in the days of Aristotle. The traditions concerning Pythagoras are somewhat complicated because the number of Vitae that do survive are often contradictory in their interpretation of the figure of Pythagoras.

Some of the magical acts attributed to him include:

1. Being seen at the same hour in two cities.
2. A white eagle permitting him to stroke it.
3. A river greeting him with the words "Hail, Pythagoras!"
4. Predicting that a dead man would be found on a ship entering a harbor.
5. Predicting the appearance of a white bear and declaring it was dead before the messenger reached him bearing the news.
6. Biting a venomous snake to death (or in some versions driving a snake out from a village). (Note: These miracles of Pythagoras are found in Hellenistic collections such as Apollonius' Historia Thaumasiai VI or Aelian's Varia Historia II.26 and IV.17. Empedocles, the extant fragments / edited with an introduction, commentary, and concordance by M. R. Wright.) These stories also hint at Pythagoras being one of these "divine man" figures, theios aner, his ability to control animals and to transcend space and time showing he has been touched by the gods.

==== Empedocles ====
Empedocles (c. 490 – c. 430 BCE) too has ascribed to him marvelous powers associated with later magicians: that is, he is able to heal the sick, rejuvenate the old, influence the weather and summon the dead. E.R. Dodds in his 1951 book, The Greeks and the Irrational, argued that Empedocles was a combination of poet, magus, teacher, and scientist.

After Empedocles, the scale of magical gifts in exceptional individuals shrinks in the literature, becoming specialized. Individuals might have the gift of healing, or the gift of prophecy, but are not usually credited with a wide range of supernatural powers as are magoi like Orpheus, Pythagoras and Empedocles. Plato reflects such an attitude in his Laws (933a-e) where he takes healers, prophets and sorcerers for granted. He acknowledges that these practitioners existed in Athens (and thus presumably in other Greek cities), and they had to be reckoned with and controlled by laws; but one should not be afraid of them, their powers are real, but they themselves represent a rather low order of humanity. An early Christian analogy is found in the 1st century CE writings of the Apostle Paul. Paul's First Letter to the Corinthians conceptualizes the idea of a limitation of spiritual gifts.

=== Magic in the Hellenistic period ===
The ascendancy of Christianity by the fifth century had much to do with this. This is reflected by the Acts of the Apostles, where Paul the Apostle convinces many Ephesians to bring out their magical books and burn them. The language of the magical papyri reflects various levels of literary skill, but generally they are standard Greek, and in fact they may well be closer to the spoken language of the time than to poetry or artistic prose left to us in literary texts. Many terms are borrowed, in the papyri, it would seem, from the mystery cults; thus magical formulas are sometimes called teletai (literally, "celebration of mysteries"), or the magician himself is called mystagogos (the priest who leads the candidates for initiation). Much Jewish lore and some of the names for God also appear in the magical papyri. Iao for Yahweh, Sabaoth, and Adonai appear quite frequently for example. (Note: There is a number of other texts among the Greek magical papyri also indebted to Judaism for some of their content. There is a "Charm of Solomon that produces a trance" in PGM IV.850–929, but its religious content is otherwise pagan. Various versions of the "Eighth Book of Moses" appear in PGM XIII.1–343; 343–646; 646–734, followed by a "Tenth (?) Hidden [Book of] Moses" in 734–1077, but the content of these too, is almost entirely pagan.) As magicians are concerned with secrets it must have seemed to many outsiders of Judaism that Yahweh was a secret deity, for after all no images were produced of the Jewish God and God's real name was not pronounced.

The texts of the Greek magical papyri are often written as we might write a recipe: "Take the eyes of a bat..." for example. So in other words the magic requires certain ingredients, much as Odysseus required the herb moly to defeat the magic of Circe. But it is not just as simple as knowing how to put a recipe together. Appropriate gestures, at certain points in the magical ritual, are required to accompany the ingredients, different gestures it would seem produce various effects. A magical ritual done in the right way can guarantee the revealing of dreams and the talent of interpreting them correctly. In other cases certain spells allow one to send out a daemon or daemons to harm one's enemies or even to break up someone's marriage.

This self-defined negative aspect to magic (as opposed to other groups defining the practice as negative) is found in various curse tablets (tabellae defixionum) left to us from the Greco-Roman world. The term defixio is derived from the Latin verb defigere, which means literally "to pin down", but which was also associated with the idea of delivering someone to the powers of the underworld. It was also possible to curse an enemy through a spoken word, either in his presence or behind his back. But due to numbers of curse tablets that have been found, it would seem that this type of magic was considered more effective. The process involved writing the victim's name on a thin sheet of lead along with varying magical formulas or symbols, then burying the tablet in or near a tomb, a place of execution, or a battlefield, to give spirits of the dead power over the victim. Sometimes the curse tablets were even transfixed with various items – such as nails, which were believed to add magical potency.

For most magic acts or rituals, there existed magics to counter the effects. Amulets were one of the most common protections (or counter-magics) used in the Greco-Roman world as protection against such fearful things as curses and the evil eye, which were seen as very real by most of its inhabitants. While amulets were often made of cheap materials, precious stones were believed to have special efficacy. Many thousands of carved gems were found that clearly had a magical rather than an ornamental function. Amulets were also made of organic material, such as beetles. Amulets were a very widespread type of magic, because of the fear of other types of magic such as curses being used against oneself. Thus amulets were actually often a mixture of various formulas from Babylonian, Egyptian, and Greek elements that were probably worn by those of most affiliations so as to protect against other forms of magic. Amulets are often abbreviated forms of the formulas found in the extant magical papyri.

Magical tools were thus very common in magical rituals. Tools were probably just as important as the spells and incantations that were repeated for each magical ritual. A magician's kit, probably dating from the third century, was discovered in the remains of the ancient city of Pergamon in Anatolia and gives direct evidence of this. The find consisted of a bronze table and base covered with symbols, a dish (also decorated with symbols), a large bronze nail with letters inscribed on its flat sides, two bronze rings, and three black polished stones inscribed with the names of supernatural powers.

What emerges then, from this evidence, is the conclusion that a type of permanence and universality of magic had developed in the Greco-Roman world by the Hellenistic period if not earlier. The scholarly consensus strongly suggests that although many testimonies about magic are relatively late, the practices they reveal are almost certainly much older. However, the level of credence or efficacy given to magical practices in the early Greek and Roman worlds by comparison to the late Hellenistic period is not well known.

== High and low magic ==
Magical operations largely fall into two categories: theurgy (θεουργία) defined as high magic, and goetia (γοητεία) as low magic. Theurgy in some contexts appears simply to glorify the kind of magic that is being practiced – usually a respectable priest-like figure is associated with the ritual. Of this, scholar E. R. Dodds claims:

Proclus grandiloquently defines theurgy as, 'a power higher than all human wisdom, embracing the blessings of divination, the purifying powers of initiation, and in a word all operations of divine possession' (Theol. Plat. p. 63). It may be described more simply as magic applied to a religious purpose and resting on a supposed revelation of a religious character. Whereas vulgar magic used names and formula of religious origin to profane ends, theurgy used the procedures of vulgar magic primarily to a religious end.

— E. R. Dodds, The Greek and the Irrational

In a typical theurgical rite, contact with divinity occurs either through the soul of the theurgist or medium leaving the body and ascending to heaven, where the divinity is perceived, or through the descent of the divinity to earth to appear to the theurgist in a vision or a dream. In the latter case, the divinity is drawn down by appropriate "symbols" or magical formulae. According to the Greek philosopher Plotinus (205–270), theurgy attempts to bring all things in the universe into sympathy, and man into connection with all things via the forces that flow through them. Theurgia connoted an exalted form of magic, and philosophers interested in magic adopted this term to distinguish themselves from the magoi or góētes (γόητες, singular γόης góēs, "sorcerer, wizard") – lower-class practitioners. Goetia was a derogatory term connoting low, specious or fraudulent mageia.

== Personages of the Roman Empire ==
There are several notable historical personages of the 1st century CE who have many of the literary characteristics earlier associated with the Greek "divine men" (Orpheus, Pythagoras and Empedocles). Of particular note are Jesus of Nazareth, Simon Magus and Apollonius of Tyana. From an outsider's point of view Jesus was a typical miracle-worker. He exorcised daemons, healed the sick, made prophecies and raised the dead. As Christianity grew and became seen as a threat to established traditions of religion in the Greco-Roman world (particularly to the Roman Empire with its policy of emperor worship) Jesus (and by inference his followers) were accused of being magic users. Certainly Christian texts such as the Gospels told a life story full of features common to divinely touched figures: Jesus' divine origin, his miraculous birth, and his facing of a powerful daemon (Satan) being but a few examples. (Note: These themes are shared amongst divine men figures: Abaris yielded to Pythagoras, and Zoraster had to resist evil daemons for examples) The gospel of Matthew claims that Jesus was taken to Egypt as an infant. This was used by hostile sources to explain his knowledge of magic; according to one rabbinical story, he came back tattooed with spells. It is also argued in rabbinical tradition that Jesus was mad, which was often associated with people of great power (dynamis). Scholars such as Morton Smith have even tried to argue that Jesus was a magician. Morton Smith, in his book, Jesus the Magician, points out that the Gospels speak of the "descent of the spirit", the pagans of "possession by a daemon". According to Morton Smith both are explanations for very similar phenomena. If so this shows the convenience that using the term "magic" had in the Roman Empire – in delineating between what "they do and what you do". However Barry Crawford, currently Co-Chair of the Society of Biblical Literature's Consultation on Redescribing Christian Origins, in his 1979 review of the book states that "Smith exhibits an intricate knowledge of the magical papyri, but his ignorance of current Gospel research is abysmal", concluding that the work has traits of a conspiracy theory.

Simon is the name of a magus mentioned in the canonical book of Acts 8:9ff, in apocryphal texts and elsewhere. In the Book of Acts Simon the Magus is presented as being deeply impressed by the apostle Peter's cures and exorcisms and by the gift of the Spirit that came from the apostles' laying on of hands; therefore, he "believed and was baptized". But Simon asks the apostles to sell him their special gift so that he can practice it too. This seems to represent the attitude of a professional magician. In other words, for Simon, the power of this new movement is a kind of magic that can be purchased – perhaps a common practice for magicians in parts of the Greco-Roman world. The Apostles response to Simon was emphatic in its rejection. The early church drew a strong line of demarcation between what it practiced and the practices of magic users. (Note: There is a parallel story in Acts 13:6–12. (though in this case perhaps an insider being chastised).) As the church continued to develop this demarcation Simon comes under even greater scrutiny in later Christian texts. The prominent Christian author Justin Martyr for example, claims that Simon was a magus of Samaria, and that his followers committed the blasphemy of worshiping Simon as God. The veracity of this is not certain, but proves the desire of the early Christians to escape an association with magic.

The third magus of interest in the period of the Roman Empire is Apollonius of Tyana (c. 40 CE – c. 120 AD). Between 217 and 238 Flavius Philostratus wrote his Life of Apollonius of Tyana, a lengthy, but unreliable novelistic source. Philostratus was a protégé of the empress Julia Domna, mother of the emperor Caracalla. According to him, she owned the memoirs of one Damis, an alleged disciple of Apollonius, and gave these to Philostratus as the raw material for a literary treatment. Some scholars believe the memoirs of Damis are an invention of Philostratus, others think it was a real book forged by someone else and used by Philostratus. The latter possibility is more likely. In any case it is a literary fake. From Philostratus' biography Apollonius emerges as an ascetic traveling teacher. He is usually labeled a new Pythagoras, and at the very least he does represent the same combination of philosopher and magus that Pythagoras was. According to Philostratus Apollonius traveled far and wide, as far as India, teaching ideas reasonably consistent with traditional Pythagorean doctrine; but in fact, it is most likely that he never left the Greek East of the Roman Empire. In Late Antiquity talismans allegedly made by Apollonius appeared in several Greek cities of the Eastern Roman Empire, as if they were sent from heaven. They were magical figures and columns erected in public places, meant to protect the cities from plagues and other afflictions.

== Jewish tradition ==
Jewish tradition, too, has attempted to define certain practices as "magic". Some Talmudic teachers (and many Greeks and Romans) considered Jesus a magician, and magical books such as the Testament of Solomon and the Eighth Book of Moses were ascribed to Solomon and Moses in antiquity. The Wisdom of Solomon, a book considered apocryphal by many contemporary Jews and Christians (probably composed in the first century BCE) claims that

God... gave me true knowledge of things, as they are: an understanding of the structure of the world and the way in which elements work, the beginning and the end of eras and what lies in-between... the cycles of the years and the constellations... the thoughts of men... the power of spirits... the virtue of roots... I learned it all, secret or manifest. (Note: The Wisdom of Solomon, pp. 172ff. The author of this apocryphal book was clearly familiar with Middle Platonism and may have belonged to the circle of Philo of Alexandria.)

Thus Solomon was seen as the greatest scientist, but also the greatest occultist of his time, learned in astrology, plant magic, daemonology, divination, and physika (φυσική "science"). These are the central aims of magic as an independent tradition – knowledge and power and control of the mysteries of the cosmos. Such aims can be viewed negatively or positively by ancient authors. The Jewish historian Josephus for example, writes that: "God gave him [Solomon] knowledge of the art that is used against daemons, in order to heal and benefit men". Elsewhere however, "there was an Egyptian false prophet [a magician] that did the Jews more mischief... for he was a cheat".

The idea of magic can thus be an idiom loosely defined in ancient thinking. But whether magic is viewed negatively or positively the substance of it as a practice can be drawn out. That is, that magic was a practice aimed at trying to locate and control the secret forces of the cosmos, and the sympathies and antipathies that were seen to make up these forces.

== Authors of the Roman Empire ==
The Natural History of Pliny the Elder (23/24–79 CE) is a voluminous survey of knowledge of the late Hellenistic era, based according to Pliny on a hundred or so earlier authorities. This rather extensive work deals with an amazing variety of issues: cosmology, geography, anthropology, zoology, botany, pharmacology, mineralogy, metallurgy and many others. Pliny was convinced of the powers of certain herbs or roots as revealed to humanity by the gods. Pliny argued that the divine powers in their concern for the welfare of humanity wish for humanity to discover the secrets of nature. Pliny indeed argues that in their wisdom the gods sought to bring humans gradually closer to their status; which certainly many magical traditions seek – that is by acquiring knowledge one can aspire to gain knowledge even from the gods. Pliny expresses a firm concept is firmly being able to understand this "cosmic sympathy" that, if properly understood and used, operates for the good of humanity.

While here lies expressed the central tenets of magic Pliny is by no means averse to using the term "magic" in a negative sense. Pliny argues that the claims of the professional magicians were either exaggerated or simply false. Pliny expresses an interesting concept when he states that those sorcerers who had written down their spells and recipes despised and hated humanity (for spreading their lies perhaps?). To show this Pliny linked arts of the magicians of Rome with the emperor Nero (who is often portrayed negatively), whom Pliny claims had studied magic with the best teachers and had access to the best books, but was unable to do anything extraordinary.

Pliny's conclusion, however, is cautious: though magic is ineffective and infamous, it nevertheless contains "shadows of truth", particularly of the "arts of making poisons". Yet, Pliny states, "there is no one who is not afraid of spells" (including himself presumably). The amulets and charms that people wore as a kind of preventive medicine he neither commends or condemns, but instead suggests that it is better to err on the side of caution, for, who knows, a new kind of magic, a magic that really works, may be developed at any time.

If such an attitude prevailed in the Greco-Roman world this may explain why professional magicians, such as Simon Magus, were on the lookout for new ideas. Pliny devotes the beginning of Book 30 of his work to the magi of Persia and refers to them here and there especially in Books 28 and 29. Pliny defines the Magi at times as sorcerers, but also seems to acknowledge that they are priests of a foreign religion, along the lines of the druids of the Celts in Britain and Gaul. According to Pliny, the art of the magi touches three areas: "healing", "ritual", and "astrology".

In his treatise On Superstition, Plutarch defines superstition as "fear of the gods". Specifically, he mentions that fear of the gods leads to the need to resort to magical rites and taboos, the consultation of professional sorcerers and witches, amulets and incantations, and unintelligible language in prayers addressed to the gods. Although Plutarch himself takes dreams and omens seriously, he reserves superstition for those who have excessive or exclusive faith in such phenomena. He also takes for granted other magical practices, such as hurting someone by the evil eye. He also believes in daemons that serve as agents or links between gods and human beings and are responsible for many supernatural events in human life that are commonly attributed to divine intervention. Thus, a daemon, not Apollo himself, is the everyday power behind the Pythia. Some daemons are good, some are evil, but even the good ones, in moments of anger, can do harmful acts. In general then, Plutarch actually accepts much of what we today might define as superstition in itself. So what he is really defining as superstition are those practices not compatible with his own philosophical doctrine.

A later Platonist, Apuleius (born c. 125), gives us a substantial amount of information on contemporary beliefs in magic, though perhaps through no initial choice of his own. Apuleius was accused of practicing magic, something outlawed under Roman law. The speech he delivered in his own defense against the charge of magic, in c. 160 CE, remains and it is from this Apologia that we learn how easy it was, at that time, for a philosopher to be accused of magical practices. Perhaps in a turn of irony or even a tacit admission of guilt, Apuleius, in his Metamorphoses (or The Golden Ass), which perhaps has autobiographical elements, allows the hero, Lucius, to dabble in magic as a young man, get into trouble, be rescued by the goddess Isis, and then finds true knowledge and happiness in her mysteries.

Like Plutarch, Apuleius seems to take for granted the existence of daemons. They populate the air and seem to, in fact, be formed of air. They experience emotions just like human beings, and despite this their minds are rational. In light of Apuleuis' experience it is worth noting that when magic is mentioned in Roman laws, it is always discussed in a negative context. A consensus was established quite early in Roman history for the banning of anything viewed as harmful acts of magic. A Roman law for example forbade anyone from enticing their neighbors' crops into their own fields by magic. An actual trial for alleged violation of these laws was held before Spurius Albinus in 157 BCE. It is also recorded that Cornelius Hispanus expelled the Chaldean astrologers from Rome in 139 BCE ostensibly on the grounds that they were magicians.

In 33 BCE, astrologers and magicians are explicitly mentioned as having been driven from Rome. Twenty years later, Augustus ordered all books on the magical arts to be burned. In 16 CE magicians and astrologers were expelled from Italy, and this was reinstated by edicts of Vespasian in 69 CE and Domitian in 89 CE. The emperor Constantine I in the 4th century CE issued a ruling to cover all charges of magic. In it he distinguished between helpful charms, not punishable, and antagonistic spells. In these cases Roman authorities specifically decided what forms of magic were acceptable and which were not. Those that were not acceptable were termed "magic"; those that were acceptable were usually defined as traditions of the state or practices of the state's religions.

== Summary ==
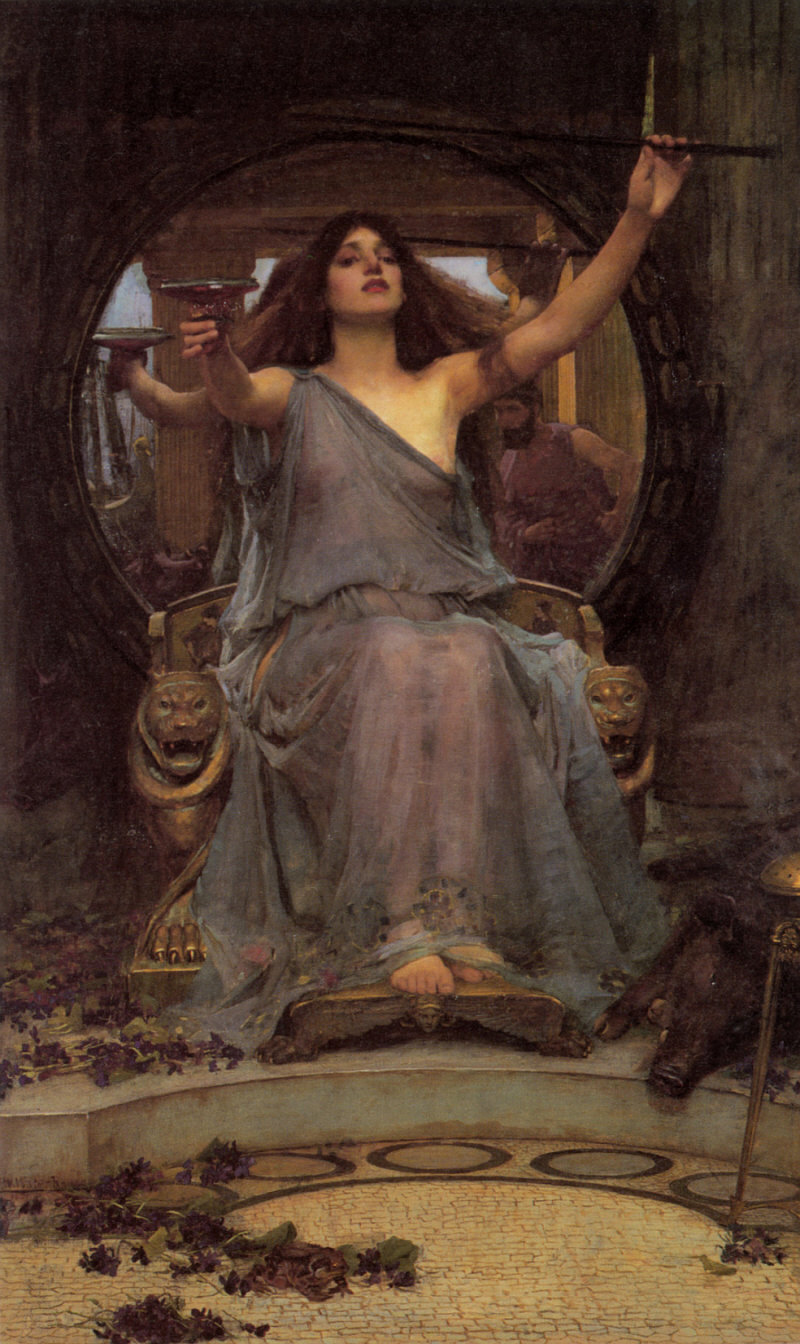
Circe Offering the Cup to Ulysses by John William Waterhouse (1891)

John Middleton argues in his article "Theories of Magic" in the Encyclopaedia of Religion that: "Magic is usually defined subjectively rather than by any agreed upon content. But there is a wide consensus as to what this content is. Most peoples in the world perform acts by which they intend to bring about certain events or conditions, whether in nature or among people, that they hold to be the consequences of those acts."

Under this view, the various aspects of magic that described, despite how the term "magic" may be defined by various groupings within the Greco-Roman world, is in fact part of a broader cosmology shared by most people in the ancient world. But it is important to seek an understanding of the way that groups separate power from power, thus "magic" often describes an art or practices that are much more specific. This art is probably best described, as being the manipulation of physical objects and cosmic forces, through the recitation of formulas and incantations by a specialist (that is a magus) on behalf of him/herself or a client to bring about control over or action in the divine realms. The Magical texts examined in this article, then, are ritual texts designed to manipulate divine powers for the benefit of either the user or clients. Because this was something done in secret or with foreign methods these texts represent an art that was generally looked upon as illegitimate by official or mainstream magical cults in societies.

== See also ==
- Curse tablet
- Ephesia Grammata
- Folk religion
- Magi
- Magic and religion
- Ancient Greek religion
- Religion in ancient Rome
- Sex magic
- Theurgy
- Alchemy
  - Hermes Trismegistus
- Goetia
