= Greek Magical Papyri =

Body of papyri from Graeco-Roman Egypt

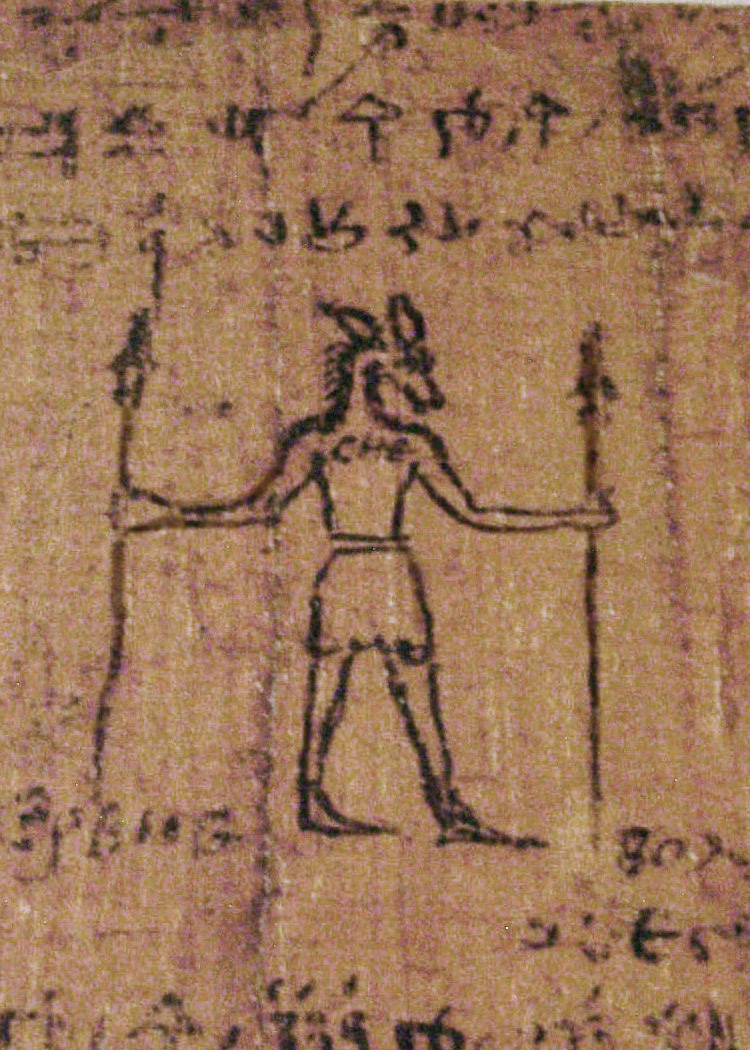
- A picture of the Egyptian god Set drawn on one of the papyri.
- Created: 100s BCE to 400s CE
- Author: Various
- Media type: Papyri
- Subject: Magical spells, formulae, hymns, and rituals

The Greek Magical Papyri (Latin: Papyri Graecae Magicae, abbreviated PGM) is the name given by scholars to a body of papyri from Graeco-Roman Egypt, written mostly in ancient Greek (but also in Old Coptic, Demotic, etc.), which each contain a number of magical spells, formulae, hymns, and rituals. The materials in the papyri date from the 100s BCE to the 400s CE. The manuscripts came to light through the antiquities trade, from the 18th century onward. One of the best known of these texts is the Mithras Liturgy.

The texts were published in a series. Individual texts are referenced using the abbreviation PGM plus the volume and item number. Each volume contains a number of spells and rituals. Those listed by Preisendanz went up to PGM LXXXI (81). Further discoveries of similar texts from elsewhere have been allocated further PGM numbers for convenience.

== History ==
=== Production ===
The corpus of the PGM were not based on an ancient archive, but rather are a modern collection that has been augmented by academics. The unclear circumstances of each text's production, over a span of centuries, have therefore occasioned some debate. Hans Dieter Betz, the English translator of the PGM, claims that the texts form a fraction of the "magical books" that must have existed in antiquity, and considers them a form of "underground literature" subject to book-burnings at the time. He cites book-burning in the Acts of the Apostles (Acts 19:19), Augustus' orders to burn magical books according to Suetonius (Suet. Aug. 31.1), and what he terms "numerous" early Christian book-burnings.

David Frankfurter, however, considers these texts productions of "innovative members of the Egyptian priesthood during the third-/fourth-century decline of the Egyptian temple infrastructure," and lends them considerably less "underground" status than Betz. Alan F. Segal goes further, using the PGM to question the dichotomy of magic and religion in scholarship on the Hellenistic world. He uses the existence of hymns in the PGM to suggest that the people who wrote them in such 'magical' texts saw no distinction between such material and the more overtly magical content in the same documents. Just how "underground" the practitioners that produced these texts were therefore remains contested, though Betz points to the admonitions to secrecy about the details of certain practices in certain of the papyri.

=== Discovery ===
The first papyri of the series were vended to purchasers of art in Egypt during the early 19th century. Another papyrus (PGM III) was acquired by the diplomat Jean-François Mimaut (1774–1837) and were deposited in the French Bibliothèque Nationale. The major portion of the collection is the so-called Anastasi collection. About half a dozen of the papyri were purchased in about 1827 by a man calling himself Jean d'Anastasi, who may have been Armenian, and was a diplomatic representative at the Khedivial court in Alexandria. He asserted that he obtained them at Thebes (modern Luxor), and he sold them to various major European collections, including the British Museum, the Louvre, the Bibliothèque Nationale in Paris, the Staatliche Museen in Berlin, and the Rijksmuseum van Oudheden in Leiden. H. D. Betz, who edited a translation of the collection, states that these pieces probably came from the library of an ancient scholar and collector of late antiquity based in Thebes, Egypt. Anastasi acquired a great number of other papyri and antiquities as well. The "Thebes Cache" also contained the Stockholm papyrus, and Leyden papyrus X which contains alchemical texts.

=== Publication ===
PGM XII and XIII were the first to be published, appearing in 1843 in Greek, and in a Latin translation in 1885. However, according to Betz 1992, the first scholarly publication has been credited to the British scholar Charles Wycliffe Goodwin, who published for the Cambridge Antiquarian Society, one PGM V, translated into English with commentary in 1853.

In the early twentieth century Karl Preisendanz collected the texts and published them in two volumes (1928 and 1931). A projected third volume, containing new texts and indices, reached the stage of galley proofs dated "Pentecost 1941", but the type was destroyed during the bombing of Leipzig in the Second World War. However, photocopies of the proofs circulated among scholars. A revised and expanded edition of the texts was published in 1973–1974 in two volumes. Volume 1 was a corrected version of the first edition volume 1, but volume 2 was entirely revised and the papyri originally planned for vol. III were included. The indexes were omitted, however. An English translation of Preisendanz's edited papyri, along with some additional Greek and Demotic texts, was produced in the 1980s by Hans Dieter Betz.

The PGM can now be searched in the Thesaurus Linguae Graecae database and various concordances and dictionaries have been published.

== Content ==
Betz observes, in the introduction to his translations, that while the papyri were produced in Greco-Roman Egypt, they contain many sections that are Greek in origin and nature. He notes how Zeus, Hermes, Apollo, Artemis, and Aphrodite, among others, are portrayed not as Hellenic or Hellenized aristocrats, as in contemporary literature, but as demonic or even dangerous, much like in Greek folklore. However, Betz also emphasizes the amount of syncretism he sees in the papyri, especially between Greek, Jewish and Egyptian beliefs. Betz noted, "In this syncretism, the indigenous ancient Egyptian religion has in part survived, in part been profoundly hellenized. In its Hellenistic transformation, the Egyptian religion of the pre-Hellenistic era appears to have been reduced and simplified, no doubt to facilitate its assimilation into Hellenistic religion as the predominant cultural reference. It is quite clear that the magicians who wrote and used the Greek papyri were Hellenistic in outlook. Hellenization, however, also includes the Egyptianizing of Greek religious traditions. The Greek magical papyri contain many instances of such Egyptianizing transformations, which take very different forms in different texts or layers of tradition. Again, working out the more exact nature of this religious and cultural interaction remains the task of future research." He is equally undecided about the sources of the Jewish elements within the papyri, declaring that "the origin and nature of the sections representing Jewish magic in the Greek magical papyri is far from clear." However, he concludes that the syncretistic elements within the papyri were a relatively unified approach, best understood as "a Greco-Egyptian, rather than more general Greco-Roman, syncretism." He also says that Albrecht Dieterich noted the importance of the Greek Magical Papyri for the study of ancient religions, because most of the texts combine multiple religions: Egyptian, Greek, Jewish, and/or others. In terms of function, Pauline Hanesworth remarks that the PGM, beyond literary and intellectual purposes, have practical aims.

Janet H. Johnson noted in 1996 that the texts can only be understood entirely when the parts written in the Egyptian language known as Demotic are accounted for. Johnson adds, "All four of the Demotic magical texts appear to have come from the collections that Anastasi gathered in the Theban area. Most have passages in Greek as well as in Demotic, and most have words glossed into Old Coptic (Egyptian language written with the Greek alphabet [which indicated vowels, which Egyptian scripts did not] supplemented by extra signs taken from the Demotic for sounds not found in Greek); some contain passages written in the earlier Egyptian hieratic script or words written in a special "cipher" script, which would have been an effective secret code to a Greek reader but would have been deciphered fairly simply by an Egyptian."

Many of these pieces of papyrus are pages or fragmentary extracts from spell books, repositories of arcane knowledge and mystical secrets. As far as they have been reconstructed, these books appear to fall into two broad categories: some are compilations of spells and magical writings, gathered by scholarly collectors either out of academic interest or for some kind of study of magic; others may have been the working manuals of travelling magicians, containing their repertoire of spells, formulae for all occasions. Some of these spells would allow an individual to subordinate another of a higher social standing.

The pages contain spells, recipes, formulae, and prayers (e.g., the Prayer of Thanksgiving), interspersed with magic words (such as charaktêres or the voces magicae) and often in shorthand, with abbreviations for the more common formulae. These spells range from impressive and mystical summonings of dark gods and daemons, to folk remedies and even parlor tricks; from portentous, fatal curses, to love charms, and cures for impotence and minor medical complaints. Some texts contain rituals in which the practitioner assumes the identity of a deity, often through invocation and visualization, as part of their ascent or magical operation.

In many cases, the formulaic words and phrases are strikingly similar to those found in defixiones (curse tablets or binding spells, κατάδεσμοι in Greek), such as those found inscribed on ostraka, amulets, and lead tablets. Since some of these defixiones date from as early as the 500s BCE, and have been found as far afield as Athens, Asia Minor, Rome, and Sicily (as well as Egypt), this provides a degree of continuity, and suggests that some observations based on the PGM will not be altogether inapplicable to the study of the wider Greco-Roman world.

Throughout the spells found in the Greek Magical Papyri, there are numerous references to figurines. They are found in various types of spells, including judicial, erotic, and curse magic. The figurines are made of various materials, which usually correspond to the type of spell. Such figurines have been found throughout the Mediterranean basin, usually in places that the ancient Greeks associated with the underworld: graves, sanctuaries, and bodies of water, all of which stress the border between life and death, which is a common theme in Greek magic. Some have been discovered in lead coffins, upon which the spell or curse has been inscribed.

=== Religion in Greco-Roman Egypt ===
The religion of the Papyri Graecae Magicae is an elaborate syncretism of Greek, Egyptian, Christian, Jewish (see Jewish magical papyri), and even Babylonian religious influences engendered by the unique milieu of Greco-Roman Egypt. This syncretism is evident in the Papyri in a variety of ways. Often the Olympians are given attributes of their Egyptian counterparts; alternatively this could be seen as Egyptian deities being referred to by Greek names. For example, Aphrodite (who was associated with the Egyptian Hathor) is given the epithet Neferihri, from Egyptian Nfr-iry.t 'nice eyes' (PGM IV. 1266).

Within this profusion of cultural influences can still be seen classical Greek material, and perhaps even aspects of a more accessible "folk-religion" than those preserved in the mainstream literary texts. Sometimes the Greek gods depart from their traditional Olympian natures, and seem more chthonic, demonic, and bestial. This is partly the influence of Egyptian religion, in which beast cult and the terror of the divine were familiar elements; equally the context of magical texts makes such deities appropriate.

== See also ==
- Ephesia Grammata
- Jewish magical papyri
- Papyrology

== Bibliography ==
- Preisendanz, K. et al. (1928-1931 first ed.) Papyri Graecae Magicae. Die Griechischen Zauberpapyri. (2 vols; vol. 1 available on the Internet Archive)
- Preisendanz, K., Albert Henrichs (1974-1974 second ed.) Papyri Graecae Magicae. Die Griechischen Zauberpapyri. (2 vols) Stuttgart: Teubner.
- Betz, H. D. et al. (1986) The Greek Magical Papyri in Translation. Including the Demotic Texts. University of Chicago Press.
- Muñoz Delgado, L. (2001) Léxico de magia y religión en los papiros mágicos griegos. Diccionario Griego-Español. Anejo V. Madrid: CSIC.
- Skinner, S (2014) Techniques of Graeco-Egyptian Magic. Golden Hoard, Singapore
- Flowers, S (1995) "Hermetic Magic" Weiser
- Hanesworth, P. (2012). Magical papyri, Greek. In The Encyclopedia of Ancient History (eds R.S. Bagnall, K. Brodersen, C.B. Champion, A. Erskine and S.R. Huebner).
