= List of Gnostic sects =

The following is a list of sects involved in Gnosticism:

== Ancient ==
=== Proto-Gnosticism ===
- Thomasines

=== Judean-Israelite Gnosticism ===
- Elkesaites
- Kentaeans
- Mandaeism
- Samaritan Baptist sects

=== Syrian-Egyptian Gnosticism ===
- Bardesanites
- Basilidians
- Satornilians
- Sethians
- Valesians
- Valentinianism
  - Heracleonites
  - Ptolemaeans

=== Persian Gnosticism ===
- Manichaeism
  - Al-Dayhuri's Sect
  - Astati
  - Shinang's Sect

=== Unclassified Christian Gnosticism ===
- Cerdonians
  - Marcionism
    - Apelliacos
    - Lucianists
- Colorbasians
- Dositheans (could be offshoot of Simonianism or proto-Gnostic)
- Justinians
- Simonians
  - Menandrians

=== Others ===
- Abelonians
- Agapetae
- Alogians
- Angelici
- Antitactae
- Aquarii
- Archontics
- Ascodroutes
- Barbeliotae
- Borborites
  - Coddians (also called Koddians)
  - Levitics (also called Levitici)
  - Phibionites
  - Secundians
  - Stratiotici
- Cainites
- Carpocratians
  - Marcellianas
- Cerinthians
  - Adamites (also called Adamians)
- Cleobians
- Docetae
- Elcesaites
- Encratites
  - Apotactics (also called Apostolics)
  - Severians
- Marcosians
- Messalians
- Nicolaism
- Ophites
  - Naassenes
  - Perates
- Priscillianism
- Quintillians, Montanist sect that may have come under Gnostic influence
- Seleucians

== Middle Ages ==
- Albanenses
- Bagnolians
- Bogomils
- Bosnian Church
- Cathars
  - Black Brotherhood
  - Credentes
  - Pasagians
  - Pataria
- Paulicianism (However the dualism of Paulicianism is not certain)
- Neo-Adamites
- Tondrakians
- Ghulat

== Modern era ==
- Mandaeism

=== Neo-Gnostic ===
- Ecclesia Gnostica
- Ecclesia Gnostica Catholica
- Ecclesia Gnostica Mysteriorum
- Ecclesia Pistis Sophia
- Gnostic Church of France
- Gnostic Society
- Johannite Church
- Neo-Luciferian Church
- Society of Novus Spiritus
- Universal Gnosticism
