= List of Christian heresies =

A heresy is a belief or doctrine that is considered to be false or erroneous by one or more Christian denominations, i.e. what is believed to be contrary to the teaching of Christianity. Heresies have been a major source of division and conflict within Christendom throughout its history. Christian churches have responded to heresies in a variety of ways, including through theological debate, excommunication, and even violence. This is a list of some of the Christian heresies that have been condemned by one or more Christian Churches.

== 1st century ==
Heresy	Condemned by	Explanation
Nicolaism	Catholic Church, Eastern Orthodox Church, Oriental Orthodox Churches, Church of the East, Protestantism	A sect traditionally believed to be founded by Nicholas of Antioch, one of the Seven Deacons described in Acts 6:1–6, who believed that sexual indulgence was necessary for salvation and ate food sacrificed to idols. They are condemned in the Book of Revelation by St. John of Patmos.

== 2nd century ==
Heresy	Condemned by	Explanation
Simonians	Catholic Church, Eastern Orthodox Church, Oriental Orthodox Churches, Church of the East, Protestantism	a Gnostic sect which regarded Simon Magus as its founder and traced its doctrines back to him.
Saturnians	Catholic Church, Eastern Orthodox Church, Oriental Orthodox Churches, Church of the East, Protestantism	a Gnostic sect based in Antioch established by Saturninus who himself, along with Basilides, a disciple of Simon Magus.
Ophites	Catholic Church, Eastern Orthodox Church, Oriental Orthodox Churches, Church of the East, Protestantism	Belief that the serpent who tempted Adam and Eve was a hero and that the God who forbade Adam and Eve to eat from the tree of knowledge is the enemy.
Docetism	Catholic Church, Eastern Orthodox Church, Oriental Orthodox Churches, Church of the East, Protestantism	A belief which holds that Jesus Christ did not have a real physical body, but only an apparent or illusory one.
Montanism	Catholic Church, Eastern Orthodox Church, Oriental Orthodox Churches, Church of the East, Protestantism	A movement which emphasized the importance of prophecy and ecstatic experiences. Its followers believed the town of Pepuza was the New Jerusalem.
Adoptionism	Catholic Church, Eastern Orthodox Church, Oriental Orthodox Churches, Church of the East, Protestantism	The belief that Jesus Christ is not the Son of God from eternity, but was adopted by God at some point in his life.
Ebionites	Catholic Church, Eastern Orthodox Church, Oriental Orthodox Churches, Church of the East, Protestantism	A Jewish sect that insisted on the necessity of following Jewish law and rites, which they interpreted in light of Jesus' expounding of the Law. They regarded Jesus as the Messiah but not as divine.
Elcesaites	Catholic Church, Eastern Orthodox Church, Oriental Orthodox Churches, Church of the East, Protestantism	Jewish Christian sect originated from the Transjordan that blended elements of Second Temple Judaism, early Jewish Christianity, Gnosticism and apocalyptic mysticism.
Encratites	Catholic Church, Eastern Orthodox Church, Oriental Orthodox Churches, Church of the East, Protestantism	An ascetic sect that forbade marriage and counselled abstinence from meat purportedly established by Tatian.
Valentinianism	Catholic Church, Eastern Orthodox Church, Oriental Orthodox Churches, Church of the East, Protestantism	A Gnostic heresy that taught that the world was created by a series of emanations from the supreme being. Valentinians believed that salvation came from knowledge of the true nature of the universe.
Sabellianism	Catholic Church, Eastern Orthodox Church, Oriental Orthodox Churches, Church of the East, Protestantism	The belief that the Father, Son and Holy Spirit are not three distinct persons, but are simply different manifestations of the same divine being.
Gnosticism	Catholic Church, Eastern Orthodox Church, Oriental Orthodox Churches, Church of the East, Protestantism	A complex system of thought that teaches that the material world is evil and that salvation can be achieved through knowledge (gnosis).
Marcionism	Catholic Church, Eastern Orthodox Church, Oriental Orthodox Churches, Church of the East, Protestantism	Marcionists believed that the God of the Old Testament was a different deity from the God of the New Testament.
Monarchianism	Catholic Church, Eastern Orthodox Church, Oriental Orthodox Churches, Church of the East, Protestantism	A heresy that taught that the Father alone is God, and that the Son and Holy Spirit are separate, non-divine beings. Monarchians were also known as Unitarians.
Modalism	Catholic Church, Eastern Orthodox Church, Oriental Orthodox Churches, Church of the East, Protestantism	Modalism is the belief that the Father, Son and Holy Spirit are three different modes of God, as opposed to a Trinitarian view of three distinct persons within the Godhead.
Patripassianism	Catholic Church, Eastern Orthodox Church, Oriental Orthodox Churches, Church of the East, Protestantism	The belief that the Father and Son are not two distinct persons, and both God the Father and the Son suffered on the cross as Jesus.
Psilanthropism	Catholic Church, Eastern Orthodox Church, Oriental Orthodox Churches, Church of the East, Protestantism	The belief that Jesus is "merely human" and that he never was divine, or that he never existed prior to his birth as a man.
Carpocratians	Catholic Church, Eastern Orthodox Church, Oriental Orthodox Churches, Church of the East, Protestantism	A Gnostic sect partially based on Platonism that was named after Carpocrates of Alexandria, its founder, and gained its final form in the writings of his son, Epiphanes.
Sethianism	Catholic Church, Eastern Orthodox Church, Oriental Orthodox Churches, Church of the East, Protestantism	Sethianism was a 2nd-century Gnostic movement that believed in a supreme god (Sophia, the Demiurge) and gnosis, as the path to salvation.
Bardaisanites	Catholic Church, Eastern Orthodox Church, Oriental Orthodox Churches, Church of the East, Protestantism	A form of Gnosticism that emerged in Mesopotamia during second-century, that blended Ancient Greek philosophy, Babylonian astrology and Christianity.
Basilidianism	Catholic Church, Eastern Orthodox Church, Oriental Orthodox Churches, Church of the East, Protestantism	A Gnostic Christian sect founded by Basilides of Alexandria that believed that the material world was created by an evil demiurge and that the goal of salvation was to escape from this world and return to the spiritual realm.

== 3rd century ==
Heresy	Condemned by	Explanation
Novatianism	Catholic Church, Eastern Orthodox Church, Oriental Orthodox Churches, Church of the East, Protestantism	A movement that arose in response to the persecution of Christians by the Roman Empire. Novatians believed that Christians who had lapsed during the persecution could not be forgiven.

== 4th century ==
Heresy	Condemned by	Explanation
Arianism	Catholic Church, Eastern Orthodox Church, Oriental Orthodox Churches, Church of the East, Protestantism	The belief that Jesus Christ is not fully divine, but is a created being.
Macedonians or Pneumatomachi ("Spirit fighters")	Catholic Church, Eastern Orthodox Church, Oriental Orthodox Churches, Church of the East, Protestantism	While accepting the divinity of Jesus Christ as affirmed at Nicaea in 325, they denied that of the Holy Spirit which they saw as a creation of the Son, and a servant of the Father and the Son.
Donatism	Catholic Church, Eastern Orthodox Church, Oriental Orthodox Churches, Church of the East, Protestantism	Originating in North Africa, Donatists believed that clergy must be faultless for their ministry to be effective and their prayers and sacraments to be valid.
Apollinarianism	Catholic Church, Eastern Orthodox Church, Oriental Orthodox Churches, Church of the East, Protestantism	The belief that Jesus did not have a human mind or soul, but only a human body.
Tritheism	Catholic Church, Eastern Orthodox Church, Oriental Orthodox Churches, Church of the East, Protestantism	The belief that there are three separate gods, rather than one God in three persons.
Collyridianism	Catholic Church, Eastern Orthodox Church, Oriental Orthodox Churches, Church of the East, Protestantism	The belief that the Trinity consists of the Father, Son and Mary, and that the Son results from the marital union between the other two.
Binitarianism	Catholic Church, Eastern Orthodox Church, Oriental Orthodox Churches, Church of the East, Protestantism	The belief that there are only two persons in the Godhead: the Father and the Son. The Holy Spirit is not considered to be a separate person, but rather an aspect of the Son or the Father.
Subordinationism	Catholic Church, Eastern Orthodox Church, Oriental Orthodox Churches, Church of the East, Protestantism	The belief that the Son and the Holy Spirit are not co-equal with the Father, but the Son and the Holy Spirit are subordinate to the Father in either nature, role, or both.
Anomoeanism	Catholic Church, Eastern Orthodox Church, Oriental Orthodox Churches, Church of the East, Protestantism	A heresy that taught that Jesus was not fully divine, but was a created being. Anomoeans also believed that Christ could not be like God because he lacked the quality of self-existence.
Euchites	Catholic Church, Eastern Orthodox Church, Oriental Orthodox Churches, Church of the East, Protestantism	Belief originating in Mesopotamia that taught the essence (ousia) of the Trinity could be perceived by the carnal senses.
Antidicomarians	Catholic Church, Eastern Orthodox Church, Oriental Orthodox Churches, Church of the East, Protestantism	Antidicomarians, also called Dimoerites, were a Christian sect active from the 3rd to the 5th centuries who rejected the perpetual virginity of Mary. They were condemned by St. Epiphanius of Salamis in the 4th century. This belief is standard in most Protestant sects.
Priscillianism	Catholic Church, Eastern Orthodox Church, Oriental Orthodox Churches, Church of the East, Protestantism	A Gnostic sect (claiming that the material world is evil) emerging in Spain, influenced by the Gnostic-Manichaean teachings of Marcus, an Egyptian from Memphis.

== 5th century ==
Heresy	Condemned by	Explanation
Nestorianism	Catholic Church, Eastern Orthodox Church, Oriental Orthodox Churches, Protestantism	The belief that Jesus Christ was two persons, the divine Son of God and the human Jesus of Nazareth. Nestorius said that the Virgin Mary is not the Mother of God (Theotokos) because she gave birth to the human part of Jesus, not the divine Son of God, and called her Christotokos. Nestorianism was condemned as a heresy by the Council of Ephesus (431).
Pelagianism	Catholic Church, Eastern Orthodox Church, Oriental Orthodox Churches, Protestantism	The belief that humans can be saved by their own efforts, without the need for God's grace.
Eutychianism	Catholic Church, Eastern Orthodox Church, Oriental Orthodox Churches, Protestantism	The belief that Christ is in one nature and of two, with the humanity of Christ subsumed by the divinity.
Monophysitism	Catholic Church, Eastern Orthodox Church, Oriental Orthodox Churches, Protestantism	The belief that Christ has only one nature (hypostasis), which is divine.
Miaphysitism	Catholic Church, Eastern Orthodox Church, Church of the East, Protestantism	The belief that Christ is fully divine and fully human, in one nature (physis). This belief is standard in the Coptic, Ethiopian and Armenian churches. Modern dialogue has minimized the difference between this and the Chalcedonian churches' doctrine of hypostatic union.
Dyophysitism	Oriental Orthodox Churches	The belief that Christ is fully divine and fully human, in two natures (physeis).

== 6th century ==
Heresy	Condemned by	Explanation
Three Chapters	Catholic Church, Eastern Orthodox Church, Oriental Orthodox Churches	The "Three Chapters" were three "Nestorian" writings. The Eastern Roman Emperor Justinian desired to reunite the Miaphysite and Chalcedonian Churches throughout the empire, and so anathematized the Three Chapters and commanded Byzantine bishops (which included, at the time, the Pope, i.e. the Bishop of Rome) to do so as well. Pope Vigilius however believed doing so would undermine the authority of Chalcedon, and so initially refused to do so. Eventually, after incarceration and deportation to Constantinople, he agreed to anathematize the Three Chapters and concur with the Emperor in December of 553.

== 7th century ==
Heresy	Condemned by	Explanation
Iconoclasm	Catholic Church, Eastern Orthodox Church, Oriental Orthodox Churches	Arising in the Byzantine Empire, iconoclasts believed that the veneration of icons was idolatry. The iconoclastic controversy lasted for centuries, until the Second Council of Nicaea in 787, when the veneration of icons was officially restored.
Monoenergism	Catholic Church, Eastern Orthodox Church, Protestantism	The belief, arising in the Byzantine Empire, that Christ had only one "energy" (energeia).
Monothelitism	Catholic Church, Eastern Orthodox Church, Protestantism	Arising in the Byzantine Empire, Monothelites believed that Christ had only one will, which was divine.
Paulicianism	Catholic Church, Eastern Orthodox Church, Oriental Orthodox Churches, Protestantism	Paulicians believed that the material world is evil, and the only way to salvation is to reject it.

== 12th century ==
Heresy	Condemned by	Explanation
Catharism	Catholic Church, Eastern Orthodox Church, Oriental Orthodox Churches, Protestantism	A Christian dualist or Gnostic movement between the 12th and 14th centuries which thrived in Southern Europe, particularly in Northern Italy and Occitania. Their violent suppression by the Kingdom of France in the Albigensian Crusade is sometimes considered an act of genocide.
Petrobrusians	Catholic Church	A proto-Protestant group that considered the New Testament epistles to have a subordinate authority, questioning their apostolic origin, and rejected the authority of the Old Testament.
Pasagians	Catholic Church	A religious sect which appeared in Lombardy in the late 12th or early 13th century that retained Mosaic Law and believed in a Demiurge.

== 15th century ==
Heresy	Condemned by	Explanation
Conciliarism	Catholic Church	Developed in the backdrop of the Western Schism, it emphasised that Popes were subservient to ecumenical councils. While it did help end the Western Schism at the Council of Constance, later on it was condemned by Pope Pius II in Execrabilis, favouring papal supremacy.
Stephanism	Oriental Orthodox Churches	The Stephanites were a sect in Ethiopia which rejected veneration of icons as well as the veneration of saints and angels. The sect was subject to suppression on account of its rejection of the legendary origins of the Solomonic Dynasty. It greatly resembled later Protestant movements in Europe.

== 16th century ==
Heresy	Condemned by	Explanation
Socinianism	Catholic Church, Eastern Orthodox Church, Protestantism	A heresy that denied the Trinity and the divinity of Jesus Christ. Socinians believed that Jesus was a human being who was inspired by God.

== 17th century ==
Heresy	Condemned by	Explanation
Jansenism	Catholic Church	A religious movement within the Catholic Church that was named after Cornelius Jansen, a Dutch theologian who wrote a book called Augustinus that argued that human beings are incapable of saving themselves by their own efforts and that salvation is entirely a matter of God's grace.
Quietism	Catholic Church	A religious movement within the Catholic Church which held that Christians should do nothing so as to not impede God's active will, and that men ought to remain silent.

== 18th century ==
Heresy	Condemned by	Explanation
Febronianism	Catholic Church	A religious movement within the Catholic Church in Germany that sought to make Catholicism more relevant to local cultures, reduce the power of the Pope, and reunite with Protestant churches.

== 19th century ==
Heresy	Condemned by	Explanation
Phyletism	Eastern Orthodox Church	Conflation of the church with the ethnic nation. It arose in the Balkans as new nations created their own autocephalous churches, resenting the dominance of Phanariots in the Rum millet under Ottoman rule. Although condemned in the 1872 Council of Constantinople, it continues to manifest in the context of diaspora politics, with multiple churches operating within the same jurisdiction, catering exclusively to their own ethnoreligious demographic group.

== 20th century ==
Heresy	Condemned by	Explanation
Americanism	Catholic Church	A political and religious outlook attributed to some American Catholics and denounced as heresy by the Holy See.
Feeneyism	Catholic Church	The rejection of the doctrines of baptism of desire and baptism of blood, on the grounds that they grant justification, but are not sufficient for salvation. Named for Leonard Feeney, a Jesuit priest from Boston.
Modernism	Catholic Church	The belief that all doctrines are subject to change, and that doctrines ought to change depending on the time and location. Condemned by Pope Pius X in the encyclical Pascendi Dominici gregis.
