= Justin (Gnostic) =

2nd century c.e. Gnostic Christian scholar

Justin (Greek: Ἰουστῖνος, romanized: Ioustînos was an early Gnostic Christian from the 2nd century AD recorded by Hippolytus. He is often confused in sources with Justin Martyr

== Life ==
Justin's life is unknown, although he likely came from a Jewish-Christian background. Most information about him comes from Hyppolytus, who might have been familiar with Justin's most important work, Baruch. He is counted among the earliest Gnostics, having lived in the era of Simonians like Simon Magus, Dositheus, Menander and Saturninus.

== Teachings ==
His teachings, synthesized in a gospel called Book of Baruch, were a highly syncretic gnostic current that mixed Jewish Christianity with classical mythology. They are considered one of the first transitions between Jewish monotheism and full-blown gnosticism, although they differ substantially from Sethian and Valentinian beliefs. For example, Justin omits any concept of the devolution or fall of the divine, and he presents the creation of the world in a positive light.

According to Justin, there were three primordial, eternal entities. Reigning supreme was the male Good One, owner of foreknowledge (identified with the Monad and the creator of the universe, as well as the Greek Priapus), under which there were the male Elohim (the Jewish god and Demiurge or creator of the world) and the female Edem (identified with Gaia and described as a "half virgin, half viper" being similar to Echidna). Elohim and Edem, ignorant of the existence of the Good One, fell in love and copulated, giving birth to twenty-four angels of both paternal and maternal nature, also creating the world in the process. Those angels then created mankind out of Edem's human part and the animal kingdom out of her snake part. However, Elohim discovered the Good One and ascended to his heaven, where he was charged to stay to redeem himself from having thought himself the greatest. Dominion over the Earth was thus assigned to Edem who, vengeful and heartbroken by Elohim's departure, released the evils of famine and disease on the world. Her twelve angels ruled the world as archons.

Edem further ordered one of her maternal angels, Naas (identified with the serpent of Edem), to cause adulteries and dissolution of marriages among men. In response, Elohim sent one of his own paternal angels, Baruch, in order to warn Adam and Eve not to eat from the Tree of Knowledge, which represented Naas himself. However, Baruch failed, as Naas had previously seduced both Adam and Eve, leading them to eat from the tree. Baruch's next attempts to save mankind through Moses and the biblical prophets failed too, so Elohim now chose an uncircumcised prophet, Heracles, to carry on the task. Heracles defeated all the twelve maternal archons by force, a series of battles known as the Twelve Labors, but he was ultimately deceived and divested of his power by one of the conquered archons, the beautiful Babel or Omphale. Only much later, Elohim finally found a human who could resist the enticement of the angels, Jesus (a son of Elohim in an adoptionist way), who would preach his true word despite being crucifixied by work of Naas.

Only five names of the angels of Elohim are preserved: Baruch, Michael, Gabriel, Amen and Esaddeus. The twelve angels of Edem are Naas, Babel, Achamoth, Bel, Belias, Satan, Sael, Adonaios, Leviathan, Carcamenos, Lathen and Pharaoh.

== See also ==
- Sethianism
- Barbelo
