= Nicolaism =

Early Christian sect mentioned twice in the Book of Revelation

Nicolaism, also called Nicolaitism, Nicolationism, and Nicolaitanism, was an early Christian sect mentioned twice in the Book of Revelation of the New Testament. The adherents were called Nicolaitans, Nicolaitanes, or Nicolaites (Koine Greek Νικολαϊτῶν, Nikolaïtō̂n, "those of Nicholas").

According to the Book of Revelation, they were known in the cities of Ephesus and Pergamum in western Anatolia and the church at Ephesus was endorsed for "[hating] the works of the Nicolaites, which I also hate" and the church in Pergamos was rebuked: "So thou hast also some [worshiping in their midst] who hold the teaching of the Nicolaites". Several of the early Church Fathers mentioned this group as heretical, including Irenaeus, Tertullian, Clement of Alexandria, Hippolytus, Epiphanius, and Theodoret. Their common view was that the sect had begun under Nicholas of Antioch, one of the Seven Deacons of the Book of Acts, but other scholars, both ancient and modern, have questioned this connection and proposed alternative theories. Due to the scanty surviving evidence, there is no present consensus on their origin, beliefs, or practices.

== Biblical passages ==
The New Testament mentions the Nicolaites in the second chapter of the Book of Revelation.

Yet this is to your credit [the church of Ephesus]: you hate the works of the Nicolaitans, which I [Jesus] also hate.

— Revelation 2:6 NRSV

But I have a few things against you [the church of Pergamos]: you have some there who hold to the teaching of Balaam, who taught Balak to put a stumbling block before the people of Israel, so that they would eat food sacrificed to idols and practice fornication. So you also have some who hold to the teaching of the Nicolaitans. Repent then. If not, I will come to you soon and make war against them with the sword of my mouth.

— Revelation 2:14–16 NRSV

== Church Fathers ==
Several Church Fathers attribute the term Nicolaitans as deriving from Nicholas the Deacon or Nicholas of Antioch (Ancient Greek: Νικόλαος, Nikólaos; Latin: Nicolaus), a native of Antioch and one of the first Seven Deacons mentioned in Acts 6:5, although the nature of the connection between the deacon mentioned in Acts and the Nicolaitans has not been definitively established.

Some scholars believe that the Nicolaitans came from another Nicholas and that Nicholas the Deacon did not become apostate.

=== Irenaeus ===
Irenaeus was of the opinion that Nicholas the Deacon was their founder.

The Nicolaitanes are the followers of that Nicolas who was one of the seven first ordained to the diaconate by the apostles. They lead lives of unrestrained indulgence. The character of these men is very plainly pointed out in the Apocalypse of John, [when they are represented] as teaching that it is a matter of indifference to practice adultery, and to eat things sacrificed to idols.

— Irenaeus, Adversus haereses, i. 26, §3

He held that the Gospel of John was written to counter the teachings of Cerinthus, which he believed was influenced by the Nicolaitans (in Adversus Haereses III. xi. 1; I. xxvi. 3). Later, Augustine of Hippo ascribed to them Cerinthian doctrines concerning the creation of the world (in his De haeresibus ad Quodvultdeum, v).

=== Epiphanius ===
Epiphanius relates some details of the life of Nicholas the Deacon and describes him as gradually sinking into the grossest impurity and becoming the originator of the Nicolaitans and other libertine Gnostic sects:

[Nicolas] had an attractive wife, and had refrained from intercourse as though in imitation of those whom he saw to be devoted to God. He endured this for a while but in the end could not bear to control his incontinence... But because he was ashamed of his defeat and suspected that he had been found out, he ventured to say, "Unless one copulates every day, he cannot have eternal life."

— Epiphanius, Panarion, xxv. 1

Hippolytus of Rome shared the opinion that Nicholas became a heresiarch (in Refutation of All Heresies vii. 24).

=== Jerome ===
Jerome believed the account of Nicholas succumbing to heresy, at least to some extent. This was also the opinion of the unknown Christian author (writing around 435) of Praedestinatus (in i. 4.), as well as other writers in the 4th century.

=== Clement of Alexandria ===
Not all early writers accepted the connection between the Nicolaitans and Nicholas the Deacon, saying that the Nicolaitans are "falsely so called" (ψευδώνυμοι, pseudṓnymoi). This negative view of Nicholas is irreconcilable with the traditional account of his character given by Clement of Alexandria, an earlier writer than Epiphanius. He states that Nicolas led a chaste life and brought up his children in purity. He describes a certain occasion when Nicholas had been sharply reproved by the apostles as a jealous husband, and he repelled the charge by offering to allow his wife to become the wife of any other person. Clement also writes that Nicholas was in the habit of repeating a saying which is ascribed to the apostle Matthew, "that it is our duty to fight against the flesh and to abuse [παραχρῆσθαι, parakhrē̂sthai] it". His words were perversely interpreted by the Nicolaitans as authority for their immoral practices. Theodoret repeats the foregoing statement of Clement in his account of the sect, and charges the Nicolaitans with false dealing in borrowing the name of the deacon.

Clement does condemn heretics whose views on sex he sees as licentious, but he does not associate them with Nicholas:

But the followers of Carpocrates and Epiphanes think that wives should be common property. Through them the worst calumny has become current against the Christian name... he [Epiphanes] says [in his book Concerning Righteousness] that the idea of Mine and Thine came into existence through the [Mosaic] laws so that the earth and money were no longer put to common use. And so also with marriage. 'For God has made vines for all to use in common, since they are not protected against sparrows and a thief; and similarly corn and the other fruits. But the abolition, contrary to divine law, of community of use and equality begat the thief of domestic animals and fruits. He brought female to be with male and in the same way united all animals. He thus showed righteousness to be a universal fairness and equality. But those who have been born in this way have denied the universality which is the corollary of their birth and say, "Let him who has taken one woman keep her," whereas all alike can have her, just as the other animals do.' After this, which is quoted word for word, he again continues in the same spirit as follows: 'With a view to the permanence of the race, he has implanted in males a strong and ardent desire which neither law nor custom nor any other restraint is able to destroy. For it is God's decree... Consequently one must understand the saying "Thou shalt not covet" as if the lawgiver was making a jest, to which he added the even more comic words "thy neighbor's goods". For he himself who gave the desire to sustain the race orders that it is to be suppressed, though he removes it from no other animals. And by the words "thy neighbor's wife" he says something even more ludicrous, since he forces what should be common property to be treated as a private possession.'

Clement asks:

And how can this man still be reckoned among our number when he openly abolishes both law and gospel by these words... Carpocrates fights against God, and Epiphanes likewise... These, so they say, and certain other enthusiasts for the same wickedness, gather together for feasts (I would not call their meeting an Agape), men and women together. After they have sated their appetites ('on repletion Cypris, the goddess of love, enters,' as it is said), then they overturn the lamps and so extinguish the light that the shame of their adulterous 'righteousness' is hidden, and they have intercourse where they will and with whom they will. After they have practiced community of use in this love-feast, they demand by daylight of whatever women they wish that they will be obedient to the law of Carpocrates-it would not be right to say the law of God... Of these and other similar sects Jude, I think, spoke prophetically in his letter - 'In the same way also these dreamers' [Jude 1:8] (for they do not seek to find the truth in the light of day) as far as the words 'and their mouth speaks arrogant things.' [Jude 1:16]

=== Eusebius of Caesarea ===
Eusebius of Caesarea speaks directly about the Nicolaitans and Nicholas, saying "At this time the so-called sect of the Nicolaitans made its appearance and lasted for a very short time. Mention is made of it in the Apocalypse of John. They boasted that the author of their sect was Nicolaus, one of the deacons who, with Stephen, were appointed by the apostles for the purpose of ministering to the poor."

Eusebius repeats Clement's story about Nicholas and his wife and holds that those he decries as heretics are claiming his name for their sect because they misunderstand the context of his presentation of his wife to the apostles and are "imitating blindly and foolishly that which was done and said, [in order to] commit fornication without shame. But I understand that Nicolaus had to do with no other woman than her to whom he was married, and that, so far as his children are concerned, his daughters continued in a state of virginity until old age, and his son remained uncorrupt. If this is so, when he brought his wife, whom he jealously loved, into the midst of the apostles, he was evidently renouncing his passion; and when he used the expression, 'to abuse the flesh,' he was inculcating self-control in the face of those pleasures that are eagerly pursued. For I suppose that, in accordance with the command of the Savior, he did not wish to serve two masters, pleasure and the Lord [Matthew 6:24; Luke 16:13]... So much concerning those who then attempted to pervert the truth, but in less time than it has taken to tell it became entirely extinct."

Eusebius held that as Satan was shut off from using persecution against Christians "he devised all sorts of plans, and employed other methods in his conflict with the church, using base and deceitful men as instruments for the ruin of souls and as ministers of destruction. Instigated by him, impostors and deceivers, assuming the name of our religion, brought to the depth of ruin such of the believers as they could win over, and at the same time, by means of the deeds which they practiced, turned away from the path which leads to the word of salvation those who were ignorant of the faith." He traces heresy from the biblical figure of Simon Magus (Acts 8:9-29) through Menander to both Saturnius of Antioch and Basilides of Alexandria. Following Irenaeus, Eusebius says "Basilides, under the pretext of unspeakable mysteries, invented monstrous fables, and carried the fictions of his impious heresy quite beyond bounds." He reports that Christian author Agrippa Castor "While exposing his mysteries he says that Basilides wrote twenty-four books upon the Gospel, and that he invented prophets for himself named Barcabbas and Barcoph, and others that had no existence, and that he gave them barbarous names in order to amaze those who marvel at such things; that he taught also that the eating of meat offered to idols and the unguarded renunciation of the faith in times of persecution were matters of indifference; and that he enjoined upon his followers, like Pythagoras, a silence of five years... Thus it came to pass that the malignant demon, making use of these ministers, on the one hand enslaved those that were so pitiably led astray by them to their own destruction, while on the other hand he furnished to the unbelieving heathen abundant opportunities for slandering the divine word, inasmuch as the reputation of these men brought infamy upon the whole race of Christians. In this way, therefore, it came to pass that there was spread abroad in regard to us among the unbelievers of that age, the infamous and most absurd suspicion that we practiced unlawful commerce with mothers and sisters, and enjoyed impious feasts." Here a doctrine of indifference concerning eating meat sacrificed to idols is put forward along with a doctrine of licentious sex, but no mention of Nicolaitanes is made nor blame assigned to Nicholas.

=== Isidore of Seville ===
The last Western Church Father was Isidore of Seville, who finished the Etymologies, in AD 636. In Book VIII titled "The Church and sects (De ecclesia et secta)" he wrote, "The Nicolaites (Nicolaita) are so called from Nicolaus, deacon of the church of Jerusalem, who, along with Stephen and the others, was ordained by Peter. He abandoned his wife because of her beauty, so that whoever wanted to might enjoy her; the practice turned into debauchery, with partners being exchanged in turn. The prophecy from the ethereal being that “is someone like the son of man” as transcribed by John, condemns them in the book of Revelation, saying (2:6): "But this thou hast, that thou hatest the deeds of the Nicolaites."

== Interpretations ==
=== Connection to Nicholas the Deacon ===
Among later critics, Cotelerius seems to lean towards the favorable view of the character of Nicholas the Deacon in a note on Constit. Apost. vi. 8, after reciting the various authorities. Edward Burton was of opinion that the origin of the term Nicolaitans is uncertain, and that, "though Nicolas the deacon has been mentioned as their founder, the evidence is extremely slight which would convict that person himself of any immoralities."

Tillemont was possibly influenced by the fact that no honor is paid to the memory of Nicholas by any branch of the church. He allows more weight to the testimony against him, and peremptorily rejects Cassian's statement (to which Neander adheres) that some other Nicholas was the founder of the sect. Tillemont concludes that, if not the actual founder, he was so unfortunate as to give occasion to the formation of the sect by his indiscreet speaking. Grotius' view is given in a note on Revelation 2:6 and is substantially the same as that of Tillemont.

=== Connection to Balaam ===
Other scholars think that the group's name was not based upon an individual's name, but as a compound descriptive word. Nico- means "victory" in Greek, and laos means "people" or, more specifically, "the laity". Hence they take the word to mean "lay conquerors" or "conquerors of the lay people".

The name Balaam is perhaps capable of being interpreted as a Hebrew equivalent of the Greek Nicholas. Some commentators think that John alludes to this in Revelation 2:14; and C. Vitringa argues forcibly in support of this opinion. However, Albert Barnes notes:

Vitringa supposes that the word is derived from νικος, victory, and λαος, people, and that thus it corresponds with the name Balaam, as meaning either lord of the people, or he destroyed the people; and that, as the same effect was produced by their doctrines as by those of Balaam, that the people were led to commit fornication and to join in idolatrous worship, they might be called Balaamites or Nicolaitanes—that is, corrupters of the people. But to this it may be replied,

(a) that it is far-fetched, and is adopted only to remove a difficulty;

(b) that there is every reason to suppose that the word here used refers to a class of people who bore that name, and who were well known in the two churches specified;

(c) that, in Rev 2:15, they are expressly distinguished from those who held the doctrine of Balaam, Rev 2:14—"So hast thou also (και) those that hold the doctrine of the Nicolaitanes."

— Albert Barnes, New Testament Notes

=== Antinomianism from John Henry Blunt ===
A common view holds that the Nicolaitans held the antinomian heresy of 1 Corinthians 6. One scholar who espouses this interpretation, John Henry Blunt, maintains that the comparison between the Nicolaitans and Balaam "proves that the fornication spoken of is not that crime under ordinary circumstances, but fornication connected with religious rites". Blunt points out that the Hebrews had a long history of preaching against or alternatively using cult prostitutes (Genesis 38:21–22; Deuteronomy 23:17–18; 1 Kings 14:24, 15:12, 22:46; 2 Kings 23:7; Ezekiel 16:16; Hosea 4:14). He also points out that the early Christians lived in a pagan culture where the worship of Aphrodite included hierodoule who engaged in ritual prostitution in her shrines and temples, and that the Dionysian Mysteries used intoxicants and other trance-inducing techniques to remove inhibitions and social constraints of believers to enter into an animalistic state of mind.

Blunt also holds that the Nicolaitans either believed that the command against ritual sex was part of the Mosaic law and it was licit for them, or that they went too far during Christian "love-feasts". Blunt sees echoes of this behavior in the admonitions which Paul gives the Corinthians, though he does not name them as such. Blunt also believes that similar echoes can be found in the admonitions of Jude 4-16 (which invokes both "Balaam's error" and "love feasts") and 2 Peter 2:2-21 (which repeats much of Jude's statements, including invoking Balaam).

The trend began early in Christianity of applying the term "Nicolaitans" to describe other antinomian groups with no attachment to the historical Nicolaitans. Tertullian in his Prescription Against Heretics, 33, is such an example: "John, however, in the Apocalypse is charged to chastise those 'who eat things sacrificed to idols,' and 'who commit sexual immorality.' There are even now another sort of Nicolaitans. Theirs is called the Gaian heresy."

Blunt pointed out that the Bible condemns the false teachings, and the use of a name to describe a group "shows that there was a distinct heretical party which held the doctrine." The letters which John dictates for the churches in Revelation 2 "show that these heretics had neither formally separated themselves from the church nor had been excommunicated."

=== Food for Idols from Victorinus of Pettau ===
Victorinus of Pettau held that the error of the Nicolaitans was that they considered it necessary to exorcise things offered to idols before eating, and that there was no sin of fornication after seven days had passed.

"But the works of the Nicolaitanes in that time were false and troublesome men, who, as ministers under the name of Nicolas, had made for themselves an heresy, to the effect that whatever had been offered to idols might be exorcised and eaten, and that whoever had committed fornication might receive peace on the eighth day."

=== Polygamy ===
Bede states that Nicholas allowed other men to marry his wife. Thomas Aquinas believed that Nicolas supported either polygamy or the holding of wives in common. Eusebius claimed that the sect was short-lived.

The description of Nicholas the Deacon as celibate was used by 16th century Protestant apologists to argue against the practice of mandatory clerical celibacy by suggesting it originated within Nicolaism first before spreading into Christianity.

=== Ecclesiastical Hierarchy ===
C. I. Scofield writes in his reference Bible:

Nicolaitanes

From nikao, "to conquer," and laos, "the people," or "laity." There is no ancient authority for a sect of the Nicolaitanes. If the word is symbolic it refers to the earliest form of the notion of a priestly order, or "clergy," which later divided an equal brotherhood (Matt. 23:8) into "priests" and "laity." What in Ephesus was "deeds" (Rev. 2:6) had become in Pergamos a "doctrine" (Rev. 2:15).

== See also ==
- Borborites
- Didache

== Sources ==
- Doctrine and covenants 117:11
