= Cerdo (Gnostic) =

2nd-century Syrian Gnostic

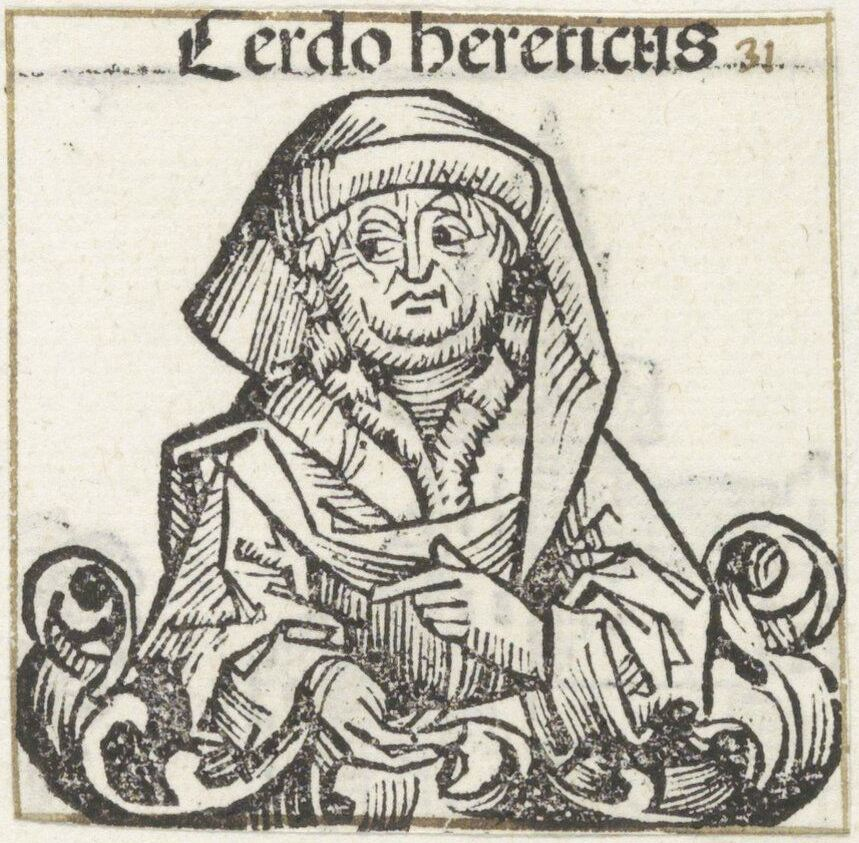
An illustration of Cerdo from the Nuremberg Chronicle

Cerdo (Ancient Greek: Κέρδων) was a Syrian Gnostic who was deemed a heretic by the Early Church around the time of his teaching, circa 138 AD. Cerdo started out as a follower of Simon Magus, like Basilides and Saturninus, and taught at about the same time as Valentinus and Marcion. According to Irenaeus, he was a contemporary of the Roman bishop Hyginus, residing in Rome as a prominent member of the Church until his forced expulsion therefrom.

He taught that there were two gods, one that demanded obedience while the other was good and merciful. According to Cerdo, the former was the God of the Old Testament who had created the world. He also said that the latter God was superior but that he was only known through his son, Jesus. Like later Gnostics, he was a docetist who rejected the bodily resurrection of the dead.

== Doctrine ==
According to the account of Irenaeus (i. 27 and iii. 4), Cerdo had not the intention of founding a sect apart from the church. He describes him as more than once coming to the church and making public confession, and so going on, now teaching his doctrine in secret, now again making public confession, now convicted in respect of his teaching, and removed from the communion of the brethren (aphistamenos tes ton adelphon synodias). Some understand this to mean that Cerdo voluntarily withdrew himself from communion, but it is preferred to understand the word passively, with the old translator of Irenaeus, "abstentus est a religiosorum hominum conventu."

The account given by Irenaeus of the doctrine of Cerdo is that he taught that the God preached by the law and the prophets was not the Father of Jesus Christ; for that the former was known, the latter unknown; the former was just, the latter good. The account given by Pseudo-Tertullian (Haer. vi.) may be regarded as representing that given in the earlier Syntagma of Hippolytus, which was also made use of by Philaster (Haer. 44) and Epiphanius (Haer. 41). It runs that Cerdo introduced two first principles (archai) and two gods, the one good, the other evil, the latter of whom was the creator of the world. Here we are to note the important difference that to the good god is opposed in the account of Irenaeus a just one; in that of Hippolytus, an evil one. In the later Refutation of Hippolytus, Cerdo is said to have taught three principles of the universe, agathon, dikaion, hylen.

Pseudo-Tertullian goes on to say that Cerdo rejected the law and the prophets, and renounced the Creator, teaching that Christ was the son of the higher good deity, and that he came not in the substance of flesh but in appearance only, and had not really died or really been born of a virgin. He adds that Cerdo only acknowledged a resurrection of the soul, denying that of the body. Pseudo-Tertullian adds, but without support from the other authorities, that Cerdo received only the Gospel of St. Luke, and that in a mutilated form; that he rejected some of Paul's epistles and some portions of others, and completely rejected the Acts and the Apocalypse. There is every appearance that Pseudo-Tertullian here transferred to Cerdo what in his authority was stated of Marcion.

== Marcion ==
It does not appear that Cerdo left any writings, nor is there evidence that those who report to us his doctrine had any knowledge of it independent of the form it took in the teaching of his Marcionite successors. Consequently, it is not possible now to determine with any certainty how much of the teaching of Marcion had been anticipated by Cerdo, or to say what points of disagreement there were between the teaching of the two. Hippolytus, in his Refutation, makes no attempt to discriminate the doctrines of Cerdo and Marcion. Tertullian, in his work against Marcion, mentions Cerdo four times, but each time only as Marcion's predecessor.

== Cerdonians ==
Epiphanius gives a heading to a sect of Cerdonians. Preceding writers speak only of Cerdo, but not of Cerdonians; and it is probable that his followers were early merged in the school of Marcion, who is said to have joined himself to Cerdo soon after his arrival in Rome.

== Date ==
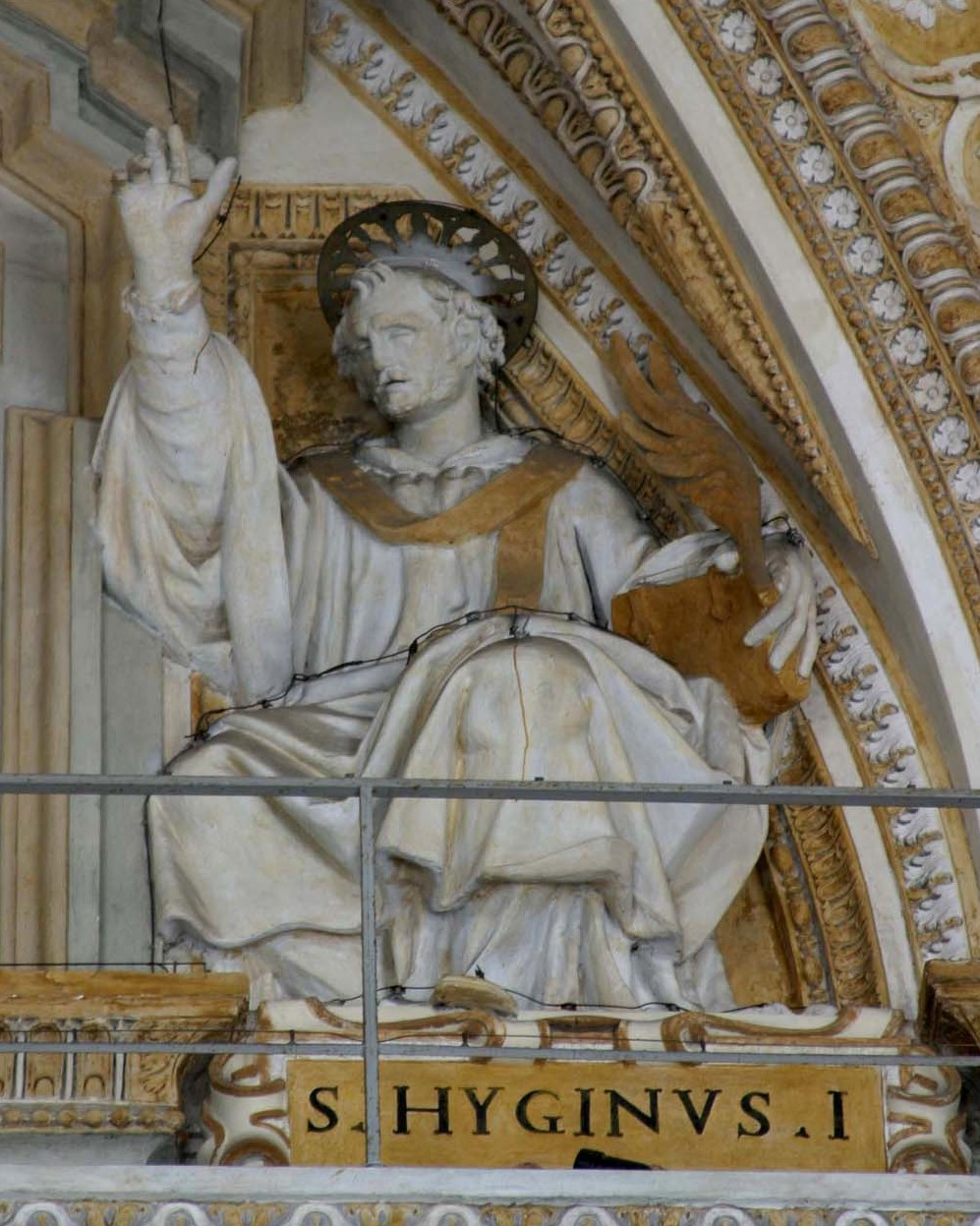
St. Hyginus.

Epiphanius and Philaster assert him to have been a native of Syria, and Irenaeus states that he came to Rome in the episcopate of Hyginus. This episcopate lasted four years, and Lipsius (Chronologie der römischen Bischöfe) places its termination AD 139–141. Having in regard the investigations of M. Waddington concerning the year of Polycarp's martyrdom, Cerdo's arrival at Rome has been placed as early as AD 135. Eusebius in his Chronicle (Schöne, i. 168) places it under the last year of Hadrian, AD 137; Jerome substitutes a date three years later. So, likewise, Theodoret (Haer. Fab. i. 24) places the Roman activity of Cerdo under the reign of Antoninus.

In the place already cited from the first book of Irenaeus, in which he speaks of the coming of Cerdo to Rome, all the MSS. agree in describing Hyginus as the ninth bishop from the apostles; and this reading is confirmed by Eusebius (H. E. iv. 11), by Cyprian (Ep. 74, ad Pompeium), and by Epiphanius. On the other hand, in the passage from the third book, though Eusebius here too reads "ninth," the MS. evidence is decisive that Irenaeus here describes Hyginus as the eighth bishop, and this agrees with the list of Roman bishops given in the preceding chapter, and with the description of Anicetus as the tenth bishop a couple of chapters further on. Lipsius hence infers that Irenaeus drew his account of Cerdo from two sources, in which Hyginus was differently described; but in the interval between the composition of his first and third books, Irenaeus may have been led to alter his way of counting by the investigations concerning the succession of the Roman bishops which he had in the meantime either made himself or adopted from Hegesippus. As for the numeration "ninth," it is uncertain whether it indicates a list in which Peter was counted first bishop, or one in which Cletus and Anacletus were reckoned as distinct.
