= Simonians =

Extinct Gnostic sect

The Simonians were a Gnostic sect of the 2nd century which regarded Simon Magus as its founder and traced its doctrines, known as Simonianism, back to him. The sect flourished in Syria, in various districts of Asia Minor and at Rome. In the 3rd century remnants of it still existed, which survived until the 4th century.

== History ==
=== In Christian sources ===
Justin Martyr wrote in his Apology (152 AD) that the sect of the Simonians appeared to have been formidable, as he speaks four times of their founder, Simon.

The Simonians are mentioned by Hegesippus; their doctrines are quoted and opposed in connection with Simon Magus by Irenaeus, by the Philosophumena, and later by Epiphanius of Salamis. Origen also mentions that some of the sect were called Heleniani.

=== Origin and development ===
According to John D. Turner, the Simonians originated as a local Hebrew cult in the first century CE, which centered on a Samaritan holy man. This early cult was syncretistic, but not Gnostic. In the second century, under influence of Christianity, Simon was transformed into a Gnostic saviour. The influence of Greek philosophy resulted in a Gnostic "monistic theogony."

According to Aldo Magris, Samaritan baptist sects were an offshoot of John the Baptist. One offshoot was in turn headed by Dositheus, Simon Magus, and Menander. It was in this milieu that the idea emerged that the world was created by ignorant angels. Their baptismal ritual removed the consequences of sin, and led to a regeneration by which natural death, which was caused by these angels, was overcome. The Samaritan leaders were viewed as "the embodiment of God's power, spirit, or wisdom, and as the redeemer and revealer of 'true knowledge'."

Dositheus, a Samaritan who died from starvation, is said to have originally been the "Standing One," or leader, of John the Baptist's sect, but stepped aside in favor of Simon Magus. Origen, who was ordained priest in AD 231, speaks of Dositheus, and also mentions Simon Magus. (Note: Origen: "Also Simon the Samaritan, a magician, wished to filch away some by his magic. And at the time indeed he succeeded in his deception, but now I suppose it is not possible to find 30 Simonians altogether in the world; and perhaps I have put the number higher than it really is. But in Palestine there are very few, and in the rest of the world, in which he wished to spread his own glory, his name is nowhere mentioned. If it is, this is due to the Acts of the Apostles. It is the Christians who say what is said about him, and it has become plain as daylight that Simon was nothing divine.") As late as the beginning of the 7th century, Eulogius of Alexandria opposed Dositheans, who regarded Dositheus as the great prophet foretold by Moses.

Like Simon, Menander, who was a pupil and, after Simon's death, his most important successor, taught the creation of the world by angels who were sent by the Ennoia. He asserted that men received immortality and the resurrection by his baptism and practiced magical arts. The sect named after him, the Menandrians, continued to exist for a considerable length of time.

Simonian influences continued through Menander's own followers who included Saturninus of Antioch and Basilides, the latter identified by Ireneus with the further development of his predecessors ideas. Carpocrates practised in the tradition of Basildes, and his own follower, Marcellina, became one of the few female leaders of early Christianity in 2nd century Rome.

== Doctrine ==
=== The Great Declaration ===
In the Philosophumena of Hippolytus, Simon's doctrine is recorded according to his reputed work, The Great Declaration, as it existed in the 2nd century. As Hippolytus himself in more than one place points out, it is an earlier form of the Valentinian doctrine, but there are things reminiscent of Aristotelian and Stoic physics.

==== Outline ====
The whole book is a mixture of Hellenism and Hebraism, in which the same method of allegory is applied to Homer and Hesiod as to Moses. Starting from the assertion of Moses that God is "a devouring fire" (Deuteronomy 4:24), Simon combined therewith the philosophy of Heraclitus which made fire the first principle of all things. This first principle he denominated a "Boundless Power," and he declared it to dwell in the sons of men, beings born of flesh and blood. Simon distinguished between its hidden and its manifest qualities, maintaining that the former were the cause of the latter. Like the Stoics he conceived of it as an intelligent being, saying that the generated world sprang from this ungenerated being. Simon characterized the world as having six roots, having each its inner and its outer side, and arranged as follows:

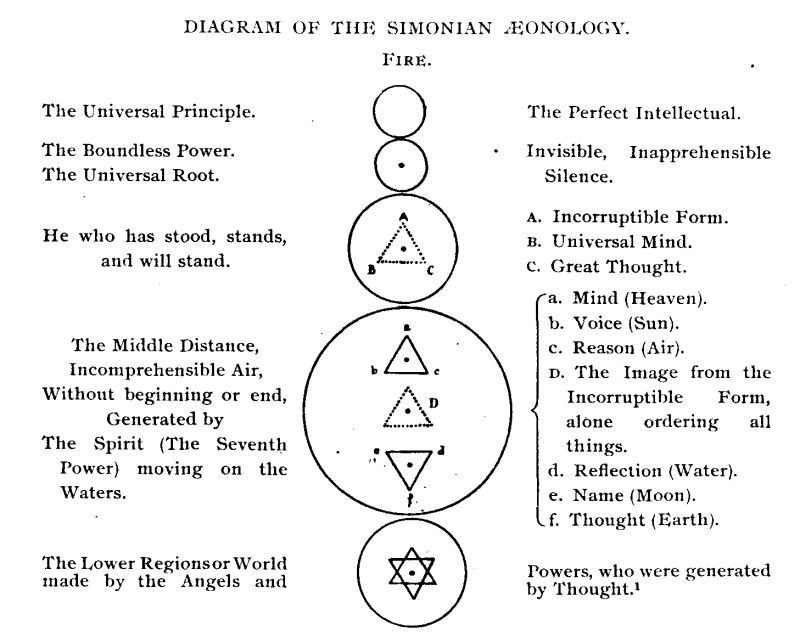
Diagram of the Simonian Aeonology, by G.R.S. Mead

These six roots, Mind, Voice, Reason, Reflection, Name, and Thought, are also called six powers. Commingled with them all was the great power, the "Boundless Power." This was that which "has stood, stands, and will stand," the seventh power (root) corresponding to the seventh day after the six days of creation. This seventh power existed before the world, it is the Spirit of God that moved upon the face of the waters (Genesis 1:2). It existed potentially in every child of man, and might be developed in each to its own immensity. The small might become great, the point be enlarged to infinity. This indivisible point which existed in the body, and of which none but the spiritual knew, was the Kingdom of Heaven, and the grain of mustard-seed. But it rested with us to develop it, and it is this responsibility which is referred to in the words—"that we may not be condemned with the world" (1 Corinthians 11:32). For if the image of the Standing One were not actualized in us, it would not survive the death of the body. "The axe," he said, "is nigh to the roots of the tree: Every tree that bringeth not forth good fruit is cut down and cast into the fire" (cf. Matthew 3:10).

==== Eden ====
There is a notable physiological interpretation of the Garden of Eden that evinces a certain amount of anatomical knowledge on the part of Simon or his followers. Here, Paradise is the womb, and the river going out of Eden is envisioned as the umbilical cord.

The navel [i.e., the umbilical cord], he says, is divided into four channels, for on either side of the navel two air-ducts [i.e., the umbilical arteries] are stretched to convey the breath, and two [umbilical] veins to convey blood. But when, he says, the navel going forth from the region of Eden is attached to the foetus in the epigastric regions, that which is commonly called by everyone the navel . . . and the two veins by which the blood flows and is carried from the Edenic region through what are called the gates [porta] of the liver, which nourish the foetus. And the air-ducts, which we said were channels for breath, embracing the bladder on either side in the region of the pelvis, are united at the great duct which is called the dorsal aorta. . . . The whole (of the foetus) is wrapped up in an envelope, called the amnion, and is nourished through the navel and receives the essence of the breath through the dorsal duct, as I have said.

The five books of Moses are made to represent the five senses:

- Genesis: Conception and Sight
- Exodus: Birth and Hearing
- Leviticus: Respiration and Smell
- Numbers: Speech and Taste
- Deuteronomy: Synthesis and Touch

==== Fragment ====
As the female side of the original being appears the "thought" or "conception" (ennoia), which is the mother of the Aeons. There is a mystical passage on the unity of all things, suggestive of the Emerald Tablet. Its language seems to throw light on the story about Helen.

To you, therefore, I say what I say, and write what I write. And the writing is this.

Of the universal Aeons there are two shoots, without beginning or end, springing from one Root, which is the Power invisible, inapprehensible Silence. Of these shoots one is manifested from above, which is the Great Power, the Universal Mind ordering all things, male, and the other, (is manifested) from below, the Great Thought, female, producing all things.

Hence pairing with each other, they unite and manifest the Middle Distance, incomprehensible Air, without beginning or end. In this is the Father who sustains all things, and nourishes those things which have a beginning and end.

This is He who has stood, stands and will stand, a male-female power like the preëxisting Boundless Power, which has neither beginning nor end, existing in oneness. For it is from this that the Thought in the oneness proceeded and became two.

So he was one; for having her in himself, he was alone, not however first, although preëxisting, but being manifested from himself to himself, he became second. Nor was he called Father before (Thought) called him Father.

As, therefore, producing himself by himself, he manifested to himself his own Thought, so also the Thought that was manifested did not make the Father, but contemplating him hid him—that is to say the Power—in herself, and is male-female, Power and Thought.

Hence they pair with each other being one, for there is no difference between Power and Thought. From the things above is discovered Power, and from those below Thought.

In the same manner also that which was manifested from them although being one is yet found as two, the male-female having the female in itself. Thus Mind is in Thought—things inseparable from one another—which although being one are yet found as two.

=== Practices ===
==== In Christian sources ====
The Simonians were variously accused of using magic and theurgy, incantations and love-potions; declaring idolatry a matter of indifference that was neither good nor bad, proclaiming all sex to be perfect love, and altogether leading very disorderly, immoral lives. Eusebius of Caesarea, in his 4th century Historia Ecclesiastica, writes that 'every vile corruption that could either be done or devised, is practised by this most abominable heresy'. In general, they were said to regard nothing in itself as good or bad by nature: it was not good works that made men blessed, in the next world, but the grace bestowed by Simon and Helena on those who followed them.

To this end, the Simonians were said to venerate Simon under the image of Zeus, and Helena under that of Athena. However, Hippolytus adds that "if any one, on seeing the images either of Simon or Helen, shall call them by those names, he is cast out, as showing ignorance of the mysteries." From this it is evident that the Simonians did not allow that they actually worshipped their founders. In the Clementine Recognitions Helena is called Luna, which may mean that the images were allegorical representations of the sun and moon.

The writer of the pseudo-Cyprian De Rebaptismate says that on the strength of the words of John, that "we were to be baptized with the Holy Ghost and with fire," the Simonians maintained that the orthodox baptism was a mere form, and that they had the real baptism, for, as soon as their neophytes went down into the water, a fire appeared on it. The writer does not dispute this claim, but questions whether it was bit of jugglery, a natural phenomenon, a piece of self-deception, or an effect of magic. The writer also mentions a Simonian book called the Preaching of Paul which advocated this baptism.

==== In The Testimony of Truth ====
Outside of these patristic sources, the Simonians are briefly mentioned in the Testimony of Truth (58,1-60,3) from the Nag Hammadi Library, wherein the Gnostic author seems to include them among a long list of "heretics":

They do [not] agree with each other. For the Si[mo]nians get married and produce children, but the ...ans abstain from their ... nature ... [to passion] ... the drops of ... smear themselves ... we ... [they agree] with each other ... him ... they say ...

[about 16 lines missing]

... [there is] no judgment ... for these because of ... them ... the heretics ... schisms ... with males ... are men ... they will belong [to the world rulers of] darkness ... of the world ... they have ... the [archons ... power] ...

[1 line missing]

... judge [them] ....

But the ...ians ... words ...

[about 11 lines missing]

... speak ... [they will] become ... in [unquenchable] fire ... they are punished.

Translator Birger A. Pearson notes that these passages probably deal with the practices of libertine Gnostic sects, but from the fragmentary state of the text, it is impossible to know to what groups are being referred. The staunchly ascetic author may have had no more issue with the Simonians than their marrying and having children. However, Epiphanius also accuses the Simonians of having "enjoined mysteries of obscenity and—to set it forth more seriously—of the sheddings of bodies, emissionum virorum, feminarum menstruorum, and that they should be gathered up for mysteries in a most filthy collection; that these were the mysteries of life, and of the most perfect gnosis."

== See also ==
- List of Gnostic sects

== External ==
- The Great Declaration - translation of Apophasis Megale

== Sources ==
- Magris, Aldo (2005), "Gnosticism: Gnosticism from its origins to the Middle Ages (further considerations)", in Jones, Lindsay (ed.), MacMillan Encyclopedia of Religion, MacMillan
- Turner, John D. (2001), Sethian Gnosticism and the Platonic Tradition, Presses Université Laval

== Bibliography ==
- M. David Litwa, Simon of Samaria and the Simonians: Contours of an Early Christian Movement, London, T & T Clark, 2024.
