= Testimony of Truth =

Gnostic Christian text, c. 200 AD

The Testimony of Truth is a Gnostic Christian text. It is the third of three treatises in Codex IX of the Nag Hammadi library texts, taking up pages 29–74 of the codex. The original title is unknown; the editor created the title based on expressions in the text, such as "the word of truth" and "true testimony." The text is a homily that argues for accepting spiritual truth and renouncing the material world. The author interprets the serpent that instructed Adam and Eve in the Garden of Eden as Christ, who revealed knowledge of a malevolent Creator. Testimony of Truth is also the only Nag Hammadi text that identifies opposing Gnostic Christian groups by name.

== History ==
The text was discovered in Nag Hammadi, Egypt, in 1945 as one of the 51 total treatises transcribed into the 13 codices that make up the Nag Hammadi library. The codices had been buried around 400 AD. The writing is a Coptic translation of a Greek original. Authorship of the original Testimony of Truth text is estimated to the late 2nd or early 3rd century AD, near Alexandria.

The beginning of the text (pages 29–45) is the best preserved section, whereas the rest of the text is fragmentary. Additionally, the last pages of the codex (75–76) are missing. In total, approximately 45 percent of the text is lost or damaged.

Along with the rest of the works in the Nag Hammadi library, the text was translated into English and published in The Nag Hammadi Library in English in 1977. The publication was part of the work of the Coptic Gnostic Library Project, which began in 1966 at Claremont Graduate University. Birger A. Pearson and Søren Giverson translated the text to English.

== Summary ==
The opening addresses those who have searched for truth but have been influenced by the old ways of the Pharisees and the scribes, who belong to the archons. Those who follow the Law are unable to understand the truth and are limited by their carnal desires. The Son of Man, who came from Imperishability, reveals the truth and has overcome passions. The foolish who confess to being Christians only in word and not with power will fall into the hands of the principalities and authorities because of their ignorance. The Son of Man performed many mighty works, including raising the dead and walking on water, but the empty martyrs cannot raise themselves.

Those who believe they will be saved through martyrdom are misguided, since salvation is not achieved through death. Instead, knowledge and self-awareness leads to true salvation. The resurrection of the flesh, which many people expect, is instead a path to destruction. True salvation is achieved through understanding and embracing the word of God, and those who do so will be transferred to the heights and achieve eternal life. But those who receive the word with ignorance will be dominated by defiled pleasures and will not reach heaven.

The text describes the journey of a man who renounces the material world and turns towards the truth to gain knowledge of God and himself. He gains wisdom and insight, breaking free from the constraints of the material world and entering into imperishability. When a person knows both themselves and God, they will be saved and receive the crown unfading. The text also distinguishes between the births of John the Baptist and Christ and encourages the reader to seek the meaning of the mysteries behind their births.

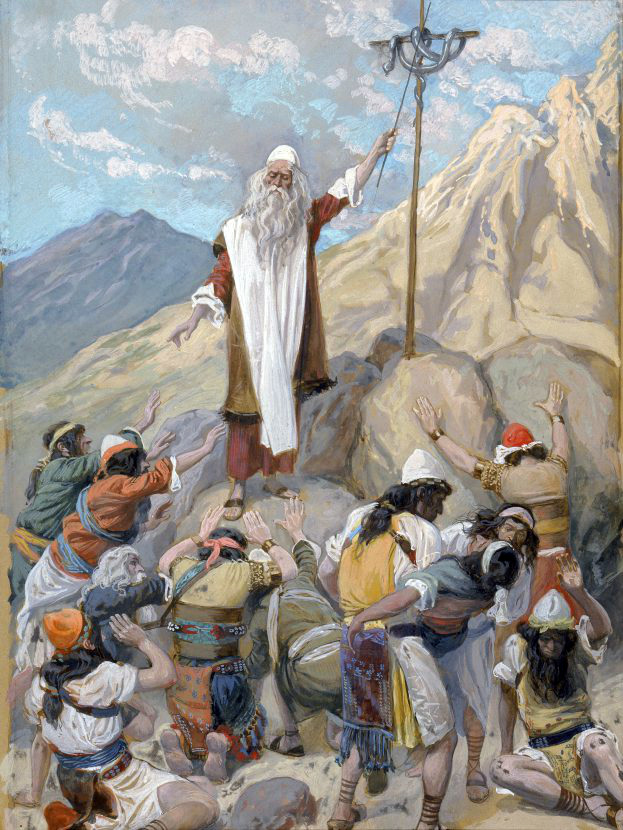
The Brazen Serpent watercolor painting by James Tissot

The text criticizes the God of the Law as portrayed in Genesis, calling him malicious and envious of Adam for eating from the tree of the knowledge of good and evil. The author argues that the serpent that instructed Adam and Eve in the Garden of Eden is Christ, citing the bronze serpent from Numbers 21:9. The author believes that simply saying "we believe in Christ" is not enough and true faith requires a spiritual understanding of Christ.

The latter part of the text discusses different Gnostic sects and their leaders, including Valentinus, Basilides, and Simon Magus. It criticizes the teachings of these leaders and their followers, who do not truly understand salvation. The author calls them heretics, says they belong to the archons, and expects punishment in an unquenchable fire. The author continues condemning those who have failed to renounce their desires, saying they are gratified by unrighteous Mammon and the father of sexual intercourse. But those who renounce their desires are from the generation of the Son of Man.

The conclusion emphasizes the importance of finding the life-giving word and coming to know the Father of Truth. The end of seeking leads to rest and silence. The baptism of truth is achieved through renunciation of the world, and those who only say they are renouncing it are lying. Some have fallen away to worship of idols or have demons dwelling with them, as David did. Solomon, whom David begat in adultery, used demonic powers to build Jerusalem. The free man is not envious and is set apart from everyone.

== Analysis ==
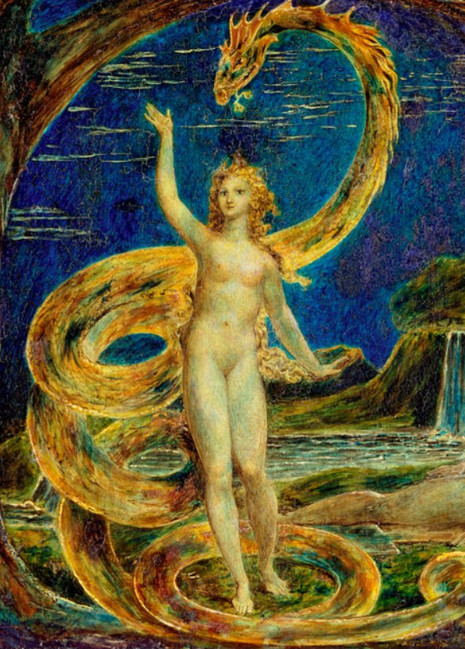
Eve Tempted by the Serpent painting by William Blake

Translator Birger Pearson outlines the structure of Testimony of Truth by dividing it into two sections. The first section consists of radical renunciation, criticism of "foolish" Catholics, rejection of sexual reproduction, a description of the archetypical Gnostic, and a conclusion that emphasizes knowing truth. Pearson believes that the "first edition" of the text may have ended after the first section, and the remaining material complements the earlier arguments. The second section of the text consists of an emphasis on Christ's passing through a virginal womb, an interpretation of Genesis 3 that parallels Hypostasis of the Archons and On the Origin of the World, the nature of true faith, and an anti-heretical thrust against other Gnostics.

Pearson also looks at the entirety of the text and notes that its Christology is largely based on the Gospel of John. The text contains allusions, quotations, interpretations, and allegories relating to the Old Testament, but New Testament literature is utilized much more often. The text's author also had access to extra-canonical Christian literature. The totality of the text is undoubtedly Gnostic, but it is unclear to which Gnostic group the author belonged.

Pearson considers it likely that the text originates from Alexandria, based on the influence of speculative wisdom within Hellenistic Judaism, especially the views of Philo. Based on the location and date of the text's origin, Pearson hypothesizes that Julius Cassianus could have been its author. In the Stromata, Clement of Alexandria criticizes Cassianus for his docetism and rejection of procreation, and Clement states that Cassianus had left the Valentinian school. Clement's description of Cassianus closely aligns with the views expressed by the author of Testimony of Truth.

Religious historian Pamela Mullins Reaves examines how the text redefines Christian identity by rejecting ritualization. She begins by noting that Early Christians reinterpreted martyrdom using sacrificial language within the Roman framework, comparing their own persecution to that of Jesus. Testimony of Truth challenges the martyrs' misguided motives. The text promotes silence as a way to mend rifts in the Early Christian community. Mullins also notes the text's criticism of water baptism. The text's author considers the Jordan River representative of bodily desires and advocates renunciation and asceticism as the proper Christian identity. Ultimately, the text emphasizes individual progress toward knowledge instead of group rituals, but it also supports good communal relations.
