= Cerdonians =

The Cerdonians were a Gnostic sect founded by Cerdo, a Syrian, who came to Rome about 137, but concerning whose history little is known. They held that there are two first causes—the perfectly good and the perfectly evil. The latter is also the creator of the world, the god of the Jews, and the author of the Old Testament. Jesus Christ is the son of the good deity; he was sent into the world to oppose the evil; but his incarnation, and therefore his sufferings, were a mere appearance. Regarding the body as the work of the evil deity, the Cerdonians formed a moral system of great severity, prohibiting marriage, wine and the eating of flesh, and advocating fasting and other austerities.

Most of what the Church Fathers narrate of Cerdo's tenets has probably been transferred to him from his famous pupil Marcion, like whom he is said to have rejected the Old Testament and the New, except part of Luke's Gospel and of Paul's epistles.

== See also ==
- Fathers of Christian Gnosticism
- Gnosticism
- History of Gnosticism
- List of Gnostic sects
