= Angelolatry =

Worship of angels

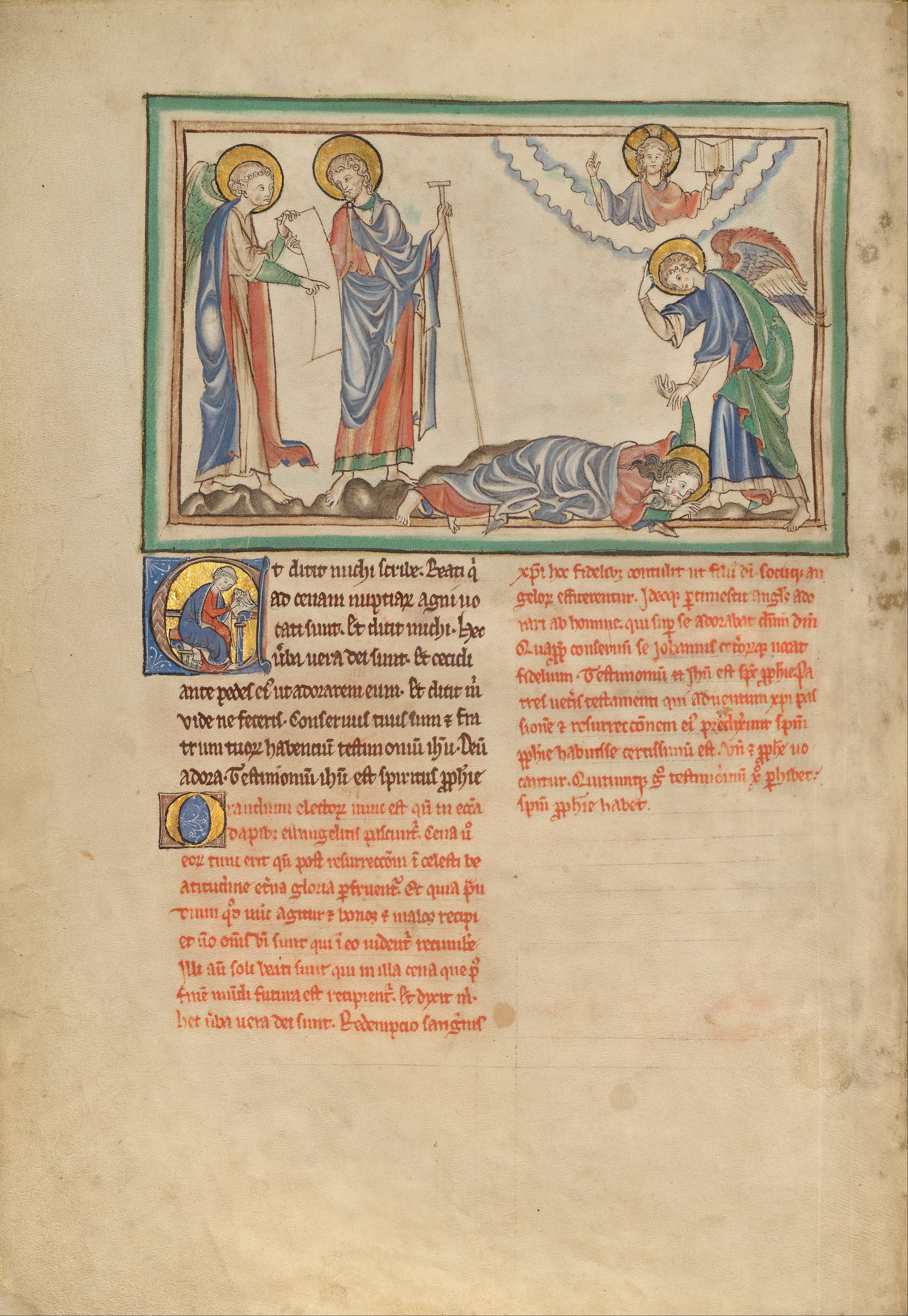
"And I fell at his feet to worship him. And he said unto me, See thou do it not: I am thy fellowservant, and of thy brethren that have the testimony of Jesus: worship God: for the testimony of Jesus is the spirit of prophecy". (Revelation, 19:10)

Angelolatry primarily relates to either excessive honouring (possibly invoking the names of) or worship of angels.

== In Greek and Roman religion ==
The Greek word angelos ("messenger") has some use in Greek religion relating to divine messengers. The Hypsistarians worshipped the Hypsistos ("Most High)" and acknowledged the gods of traditional Greek religion as angels but some modern scholars identify the Hypsistarian groups, with gentile God-fearers, to Hellenistic Judaism.

In 1981, A.R.R. Sheppard published an inscription (from near Kotiaion) related to Holiness and Justice, personifications honoured, or worshipped, in areas of Phrygia and Lydia. The significant discovery in the inscription was Sheppard's reading: ΦΙΛΑΝΓΕΛΩΝ (”Friends-of-angels”) an apparent evidence of pagan reverence of angels:

“Aur(elius) … the Association of Friends of the Angels (made) a vow to Holiness and Justice”.

In 1996, Clinton E. Arnold, based on Sheppard's inscription, advanced the theory of a pagan, not Jewish, background to Colossians 2:8-23. Arnold argued for the general importance of angels in Asia Minor as a common folk practice in this region. He suggested that pagans were invoking the names of angels for protection following Jewish influences.

However, in 2005 Hasan Malay revisited the inscription and argues that Sheppard likely misread a phi (Φ) as a gamma (Γ) and the inscription should read ΦΙΛΑΝΠΙΛΟΙ, "Friends-of-the-vine" or "Vine-lovers", with no angels. Malay also published a second inscription, dated 161 CE, confirming the existence of associations devoted to the vine from nearby Katakekaumene in Cappadocia, now in the Manisa Museum. Hence the Kotiaion inscription should read:

“Aur(elius) … the Association of Friends of the Vine (made) a vow to Holiness and Justice”.

== In Judaism ==
The Hebrew Bible strictly prohibits worship of idols made in the likeness of anything in heaven, according to the first commandment found in Exodus 20:4. For this reason actual "worship" of angels is not documented in Judaism beyond the following:

- In pre-exilic Judaism the term the Host of Heaven has primarily pagan associations, the stars, or gods of the zodiac, unconnected with angels, as illustrated by the prohibition in Deuteronomy 4:19, later broken by kings Ahab and Manasseh in worshipping the Host of Heaven, documented in 2 Kings 17:16 and 21:3 respectively. This is consistent with rabbinical era teaching. In post-exilic Judaism, the Host of Heaven are possibly re-classed as angels, cf. Nehemiah 9:6 "the host of heaven worships you", but worship of the Host of Heaven has ceased.
- In Intertestamental Judaism, worship of angels is not found, but a developed angelology, angelic hierarchies, and the invocation of angels is found. For example, the Maccabean fighters invoked the unnamed angel that earlier in the days of Hezekiah had destroyed the army of Sennacherib.
- The Talmud knew of angelic apparitions, but not of the conjuration of angels, which must be distinguished from the conjuration of demons.
- In Gaonic Mysticism, the Book of Raziel gives directions for invoking angels, that change according to the date and purpose, such as prophecy. After this the Kabbalah takes the same position as regards conjuration found concerning the conjuration and abjuration of demons in magical works such as the Testament of Solomon.
- Rabbi Ishmael, in a Midrash of time of Hadrian (Mek.Yitro 10) prohibits worship of the likeness of angels of the ofanim and cherubim.

One can theorize that the worship of angels was occurring in Ancient Israel, hence a law was made to prohibit this activity.

== In Christianity ==
=== In the New Testament ===
Stephen, in Acts 7:42, comments on Old Testament worship of the Host of Heaven without making any connection to angels.

The primary contact point in the New Testament is the condemnation of the “worship of angels” in Colossians:

"Let no one disqualify you, insisting on asceticism and worship of angels, going on in detail about visions, puffed up without reason by his sensuous mind" (Colossians 2:18)

There is however a question as to whether the word used here in fact means "worship". The word used is simply the common word for "religion" (θρησκεία thrēskeia, Acts 26:5, James 1:26,27) not the word "worship" (λατρεία latreia, cf. verb form in Acts 7:42) used of God or pagan deities. This leaves open the possibility that what Paul meant was not actually Christians who bowed down and literally worshipped angels, but a wider range of uses perhaps including:

- invocation of angels
- excessive interest in angelic hierarchies
- conception of angels as mediators

and so on.

In the Latin Vulgate this had been rendered et religione angelorum, and this was rendered "religioun of aungelis" by Wycliffe.

Toward the end of the Book of Revelation, John of Patmos begins to worship an angel. The angel rebukes him, telling him to worship God instead (see Revelation 22:8–9).

=== Angelici ===
The Angelici were a heretical sect of the 3rd century. Augustine supposes them thus called from their yielding an extravagant worship of angels. However Augustine provides no evidence for this charge and Epiphanius derives their name from the belief that God created the world through the angels.

== Gnosticism ==
While falling short of actual worship of angels 3rd century Gnosticism developed heavily ideas concerning the archons. Celsus repeats the charge of worship of angels against Aristides.

== Yazidi ==
The Yazidi religion has as its object beings that are generally referred to as angels. These are agents of a single god, which are worshipped in its stead. The most relevant of these angels is Melek Taus, to which God has entrusted the world, but other figures of worship include Jabra'il, Mikha'il, Israfil, Dadra'il, Azrafil and Shamkil.

== See also ==
- Theistic Satanism
- Polytheism
- Yazdânism
