= Apelles (Gnostic) =

Second-century Christian writer

Apelles (Greek: Aπελλής) was a second-century Gnostic Christian thinker. He began his ministry as a disciple of Marcion of Sinope, likely in Rome. However, at some point, Apelles either left or was expelled from the Marcionite church.

According to Tertullian, this separation occurred because Apelles became involved with a woman named Philumena, who claimed to be possessed by an angel that revealed 'revelations' to her. Apelles publicly read these revelations, which was seen as controversial. Since Marcion preached that Christians should practice celibacy and abstain from marriage, Apelles' relationship with Philumena was deemed unacceptable by the Marcionite church.

After his departure from the Marcionite community, Apelles traveled to Alexandria, where he developed his own distinctive theological doctrine — a modified form of Marcionism.

== Doctrine ==
=== Philosophy and beliefs ===
Apelles' philosophy appears to have been a departure from the strict dualism and complete rejection of the material world found in Marcion's teachings. For example, Apelles believed in a single Supreme God, as opposed to the two gods posited by Marcionism. According to Apelles, the Supreme God first created the heavens along with the "powers and angels" who inhabit them. The Earth, however, was created by a fiery angel subordinate to the Supreme God. This angel sought to imitate the heavenly world but failed to replicate it with the same perfection as the Supreme God.

=== Christology ===
Unlike the Docetic view promoted by Marcion — which held that Jesus never possessed a physical body — Apelles taught that Jesus had true human flesh. However, he denied that Jesus was born of human parents. Instead, Apelles claimed that Jesus descended directly from heaven and that his body was formed from the "stars and the substances of the higher world" as he passed through the heavens to Earth.

Apelles also taught that during Jesus' ascension back to heaven, he dismantled his fleshly body, returning its constituent elements to their original places in the heavens. This view is distinct from mainstream Christian doctrine, which asserts that Jesus ascended bodily into heaven.

=== Views on Jewish scriptures ===
Apelles' attitude toward the Hebrew scriptures was notably different from that of Marcion. While Marcion viewed Jewish scripture as a legitimate revelation from the "creator god" (albeit a lesser god distinct from the Supreme God), Apelles believed that much of the Old Testament was composed of "fables" and contained failed prophecies.

Despite this critical view, Apelles did not reject all of the Jewish scriptures. He regarded certain parts as divinely inspired, though it remains unclear which specific portions he accepted as true and which he considered false. This nuanced stance distinguished him from Marcion, who rejected the Jewish scriptures entirely as the product of a false god.

=== Theological differences with Marcion ===
Although Apelles diverged from Marcion on several key points, he retained some core elements of Marcionite theology. Like Marcion, Apelles rejected the belief in the resurrection of the body. Instead, he taught that only the souls of Christians would be saved and transported to heaven, while their physical bodies would not be resurrected.

Additionally, Apelles continued to use Marcion's Apostolikon as scripture. This collection consisted of shorter versions of ten Pauline epistles, which had been edited to exclude passages that Marcion and his followers viewed as contrary to their theological views.

== Legacy ==
Apelles authored several books, none of which have survived. One of his most notable works was Revelations, which he claimed was based on the divine revelations of his partner, Philumena. According to Tertullian, Philumena was a virgin who later became a "monstrous prostitute" and misled Apelles into composing the Revelations under her influence.

Apelles also authored a series of books titled Syllogisms, in which he sought to disprove specific passages from the Pentateuch regarding the nature of God. These works aimed to expose what Apelles believed to be the falsehoods of Moses' writings about God. The title Syllogisms suggests that Apelles may have intended to counter Marcion's Antitheses, which juxtaposed the teachings of the Old Testament with those of the New Testament.

There is also evidence that Apelles may have had his own gospel, referred to by Jerome as the Gospel of Apelles (Latin: Apellis euangelium). Scholars have described this gospel as being similar to the Gospel of Marcion, although little is known about its specific contents.

Apelles is last mentioned as being active in Rome toward the end of the 2nd century AD.

The followers of Apelles, known variously as the Apellitae, Apelliacos, or Apelleasts, remain largely obscure. Tertullian reportedly wrote a tract against them, but this work has not survived. Some of what is known about this sect comes from the writings of Ambrose of Milan in the 4th century. In his work De Paradiso (On the Garden of Eden), Ambrose directed several of his comments against the Apellitae. However, it is unclear if the sect was still active at that time or if Ambrose was merely citing earlier material, possibly drawing from a now-lost work of Tertullian on the same topic.

== See also ==
- Fathers of Christian Gnosticism
- History of Gnosticism
- List of Gnostic sects
- List of Gospels
