= Apotactics =

Early Christian sect

The Apotactics or Apotactites (from the Greek apotassomai, to renounce, because of their renunciation of private property) were a Christian sect in the western and southern parts of Asia Minor starting in about the third century. They were also known as Apostolics, because they attempted to follow the manner of life of the Twelve Apostles.

Epiphanius of Salamis, writing in the fourth century, considered the Apotactics to be related to the Tatians, Encratites, and Cathari; the fifth-century Codex Theodosianus considered them a branch of the Manichaeans. In addition to a strict renunciation of private property, the Apotactics abstained from marriage, wine, and meat. They included the Acts of Andrew and Acts of Thomas in their Biblical canon.

By the time when Epiphanius was writing, in the fourth century, the Apotactics had become less prominent, found only in a small area around Phrygia, Cilicia, and Pamphylia. They are mentioned by Basil of Caesarea, Augustine of Hippo, and John of Damascus.
