= Severian Encratites =

Sect of gnostic Encratites

The Severians were a sect of gnostic Encratites. Epiphanius supposes their leader Severus to have preceded Tatian (founder of Encratites) but Eusebius, Theodoret, and Jerome make him Tatian's successor. These latter authorities are followed by most ecclesiastical historians, and the silence of Irenaeus and Hippolytus regarding Severus renders the later date most probable.

Ephiphanius ascribes to the Severians a belief in the well known Gnostic power Ialdaboth (Yaldabaoth) who appears in the Ophite system as the first offspring of Bythus and Ennoia. The Severians held that Ialdaboth was a great ruler of the powers, that from him sprung the Devil: that the Devil being cast down to the earth in the form of the serpent produced the vine, whose snake-like tendrils indicate its origin: that the Devil also created woman and the lower half of man.

== See also ==
- Gnosticism
