= Angelici (sect) =

The Angelici were an obscure heretical sect of the 3rd century.

== Name ==
Epiphanius states that little is known of the sect, and conjectures that the name either comes from them possibly holding a belief that angels created the world, or else that they believed that they were so pure as to be angels. Citing Epiphanius, and expanding, St. Augustine supposes they are called Angelici because of an extravagant worship of angels, and such as tended to idolatry.

== Beliefs ==
Epiphanius states that he is entirely ignorant as to what the core tenets of the sect are.
