= Agrippa Castor =

Ancient Greek writer

Agrippa Castor (Ancient Greek: Ἀγρίππας Κάστωρ, romanized: Agríppas Kástōr) was an Ancient Greek writer who lived during the reign of Hadrian around AD 135. He has been identified as "the earliest recorded writer against heresy, and apparently the only one who composed a book solely devoted to the refutation of Basilides. Little is known of him besides second-hand passing in ancient historical references.

Agrippa Castor was known by both Eusebius and Jerome as an author who provided a critique of Basilides (died c. 132) and his twenty-four books of "Exegetics". Eusebius mentions him within the narrative of early gnostic "succession" and schools, but provides no other details of his life. Jerome mentions Agrippa Castor in a quote about Quadratus and Aristides, both at Athens. He likens Agrippa Castor to being first of the Christian "apologists", like Hegesippus, and Justin Martyr.

From these small passages, it could be concluded that "Quadratus of Athens wrote when Hadrian visited Athens", that is, around the winter of AD 124–125; "Aristides and Justin probably replied to the attack made by the rhetorician Fronto" who was consul suffectus in 143. Hegesippus is not included by modern scholarship among the "apologists," being known instead with Eusebius and Jerome as an historian, who "went to Rome in the time of Anicetus, the tenth bishop after Peter, and continued there till the time of Eleutherius", circa AD 155 and 189.

From this time "Agrippa accuses Basilides of teaching that it was a matter of no moral significance to taste food offered to idols", and one could "renounce without reservation the faith in times of persecution" and that "he imposed upon his followers a five years' silence after the manner of Pythagoras". Agrippa Castor also is recorded as having found in Basilides the same concerns for the numerology, and the use of "Abrasax" for Basilides' "most high God"; the name Abrasax being found engraved on Greek magical gems or recorded in Greek magical papyri.

== See also ==
- Agrippa (disambiguation), for others with this surname
