= Menander (Gnostic) =

First century Samaritan Gnostic

Menander (Ancient Greek: Μένανδρος) was a first-century AD Samaritan Gnostic and magician. He belonged to the school of the Simonians, becoming its leader after the death of his master and instructor, Simon Magus, who was in Rome during the reign of Emperor Claudius.

He is mentioned in the works of Irenaeus, Tertullian and others. Justin Martyr is the oldest source of knowledge about Menander after he met some of the devoted Menandrians in their old age.

== Biography ==
Justin suggested that Menander was born in Cappareteia and established a school in Antioch where he announced himself the messiah and vowed to defeat the angels that were keeping the world in captivity, possibly through exorcism.

When the Simonians divided during the Gnostic schism, Menander called his part of the sect Menandrians, holding the belief that the world was made by angels. His ideas contrasted with those of Saturninus of Antioch and the Satornilians, who believed the world was made by only seven angels against the will of a "Father on high". Menander held that a water baptism was essential as the source for eternal youth.

Menander held solid to the belief that as head of the church, he was the savior and Power of God. Menander maintained that "the primary power continues unknown to all but that he himself is the person who has been sent forth from the presence of the invisible beings as a savior, for the deliverance of men".

Other Gnostics including Basilides and Cerdo became followers of Menander and were said to have "given immense development to his doctrines" with differing ethical consequences. It has been suggested that some of those who tried to interpret the doctrines of Menander, such as Justin Martyr and Irenaeus, took things far too literally. Irenaeus for instance, claimed that, according to his followers, those in receipt of Menander's water baptism no longer grew old and became immortal.
