= Aquarii =

In Christianity, Aquarii are those who substitute water for wine in the Eucharist. In Greek they were called Hydroparastatae, or those who offer water. Theodosius I, in his edict of 382, classes them as a special sect with the Manicheans, who also eschewed wine.

== Modern day ==
Members of The Church of Jesus Christ of Latter-day Saints, commonly called "Mormons", use water instead of wine for their Sacrament ordinance. This is done due to the LDS doctrine against alcohol, known as the Word of Wisdom.

== See also ==
- Christian views on alcohol
