= Dositheos (Samaritan) =

1st century AD Samaritan religious leader and founder of a gnostic Samaritan sect

Dositheos (occasionally also known as Nathanael, both meaning "gift of God") was a Samaritan religious leader. He was the founder of a Samaritan sect often assumed to be Gnostic in nature, and is reputed to have known John the Baptist, and been either a teacher or a rival of Simon Magus.

== Christian and Jewish sources ==
Dositheos probably lived in the first century CE. Eusebius and the Pseudo-Clementines portray Dositheus as Jewish, while Pseudo-Tertullian and Philastrius describe him as Samaritan. According to Epiphanius, he was an ambitious Jew who later allied himself with the Samaritans.

According to Pseudo-Tertullian, he was the first to deny the Nevi'im (Prophets). Jerome gives the same account, saying, "I say nothing of the Jewish heretics who before the coming of Christ destroyed the law delivered to them: of Dositheus, the leader of the Samaritans who rejected the prophets". Hippolytus begins his enumeration of the 32 heresies by mentioning Dositheos; hence the sect is made to appear older than the Sadducees, and on the heresy is based the system of Philaster. He was not mentioned by the two early patristic authors Justin Martyr or Irenaeus.

The Samaritan chronicler Abu al-Fatḥ of the fourteenth century, who used reliable native sources, places the origin of the Dosithean sect in the time before Alexander the Great. The rabbinical sources also contain obscure references to Dositheos and Sabbæus as the two founders respectively of the Samaritan sects of the Dositheans and Sabuæans. These have been identified with the Samaritans Sabbæeus and Theodosius, of whom Josephus relates, that they defended before the Egyptian king Ptolemæus Philometor against Andronicus, the advocate of the Jews, the sanctity of Mount Gerizim.

The Samaritan chronicles (the Book of Joshua and Abu al-Fath's Annales) recount a similar discussion between Zerubbabel and Sanballat. Josephus stated that the Samaritans had two advocates, he doubtless meant the two apostles Dositheus and Sabbæus, whose doctrine, including the sanctity of Mount Gerizim, rejection of the prophetical books of the Old Testament and denial of the resurrection, was on the whole identical with that of the Samaritans.

According to Hegesippus, Dositheus lived later than Simon Magus, the first heresiarch of the Church; other authors speak of him as the teacher of Simon, at the same time confounding him with Simon Magus, connecting his name with Helena, and stating that he was the "being". Origen says that Dositheus pretended to be the Christ (Messiah), applying Deut 18:15 to himself, and he compares him with Theudas and Judas the Galilean. Origen also says that Dositheus' disciples pretended to possess books by him, and related concerning him that he never suffered death, but was still alive. To this can be compared the story of Epiphanius regarding his death by starvation in a cave. Epiphanius adds that while some of the Dositheans lead loose lives, others preserve a rigid morality, refrain from the use of meat, observe the rite of circumcision, and are very strict in keeping the Sabbath and in observing the laws of Levitical purity. These statements may, however, refer to another Dositheus, who belonged to the Encratites.

Origen says that the Dositheans were never in a flourishing state and that in his time, they had almost entirely disappeared, scarcely thirty of them being left. The Midrash, however, speaks of Dositheans, with whom Rabbi Meir had dealings, and two names, "Dosion and Dosthion," are also mentioned, which either refer to two Dosithean sectarians or form a double designation for the heretic Dositheus. Yet the fact that the patriarch Eulogius of Alexandria (who probably lived 582–603) disputed against the Samaritan followers of Dostan (Δοσθήν) or Dositheus, and wrote a work expressly against them (Photius, "Bibliotheca," cod. 230), shows that the Dositheans existed and even exercised a certain power in the sixth century. Origen possibly refers to a Christian sect of the Dositheans, who in fact left no traces, while the Samaritan sect certainly continued to exist. In Egypt especially, the sect was probably numerous enough to induce the Christian patriarch of Alexandria to engage in polemics against it.

The Pseudo-Clementine Recognitions and Homilies tells how Dositheos, by spreading a false report of Simon Magus' death, succeeded in installing himself as head of his sect. Simon on coming back thought it better to dissemble, and, pretending friendship for Dositheus, accepted the second place. Soon, however, he began to hint to the thirty that Dositheus was not as well acquainted as he might be with the doctrines of the school.

Dositheus, when he perceived that Simon was depreciating him, fearing lest his reputation among men might be obscured (for he himself was supposed to be the Standing One), moved with rage, when they met as usual at the school, seized a rod, and began to beat Simon; but suddenly the rod seemed to pass through his body, as if it had been smoke. On which Dositheus, being astonished, says to him, 'Tell me if thou art the Standing One, that I may adore thee.' And when Simon answered that he was, then Dositheus, perceiving that he himself was not the Standing One, fell down and worshipped him, and gave up his own place as chief to Simon, ordering all the rank of thirty men to obey him; himself taking the inferior place which Simon formerly occupied. Not long after this he died.

== Arabic sources ==
In Egypt the Arabic writers may have become acquainted with the Dositheans, though some may have survived also in Syria and Palestine, as is evident from the rabbinical sources. Al-Masudi, of the tenth century, says that the Samaritans were divided into two sects, that of the Kushan, or ordinary Samaritans (="Kuthim"), and that of the Dostan (Dositheans; compare Δοσθήν). Al-Shahrastani calls them "Kusaniyyah" and "Dusitaniyyah." Abu al-Fatḥ says of the Dostan, the Samaritan Dositheans, that they abolished the festivals instituted by the Mosaic law, as well as the astronomical tables, counting thirty days in every month, without variation. It reminds one of the Sadducees, and is a further proof that the Dositheans were their spiritual descendants. The statement that the festivals were abolished, probably means that the Dositheans celebrated them on other days than the Jews; but as, according to a statement of Epiphanius, the Dositheans celebrated the festivals together with the Rabbinic Jews, an approximation may well be assumed toward the Karaites, a sect with which the Samaritans had much in common in later times. The determination of the months by means of the testimony of witnesses may also have been a Karaite custom although that practice may go back to a time before the opposite view existed.

Under the Abbasid khalifs the Samaritans persecuted the Dositheans, although they themselves had to suffer much. Under Ibrahim (218–227 of the Hijrah) the synagogue of the Samaritans and Dositheans at Nablus was burned by heretics, but it was subsequently rebuilt. Yusuf ibn Dasi, governor of Palestine, entirely forbade the worship of the Dositheans; and the sect may in consequence have been absorbed by the Samaritans.

The Samaritan Continuatio to the Chronicle of Abu'l-Fath sheds more light on Samaritans' relations with Dositheans during the Abbasid period. In the 840s rebellion of Abu Harb, Asasbi, Samaritan community leader (referred to as "King of Israel" in the Continuatio), banned Dositheans during a ceremony on Mount Gerizim, where the Samaritans pledged not to drink or marry Dositheans. During Caliph al-Mutawakkil's reign (847–861), Samaritans restricted Dositheans from praying with them due to Torah reading controversy. When the prominent Samaritan Yosef Iban Adhasi died, the Dositheans caused disturbance, possibly even expressing joy at the news. The Samaritan rais then decided that no one would give or take anything from them, and nobody would eat or drink with them either.

== See also ==
- Mandaeans
