= Encratites =

Ascetic 2nd-century Christian sect

The Encratites ("self-controlled") were an ascetic 2nd-century sect of Christians who forbade marriage and counselled abstinence from meat. Eusebius says that Tatian was the author of this heresy. It has been supposed that it was these Gnostic Encratites who were chastised in the epistle of 1 Timothy (4:1–4).

== Early history ==
The first mention of a Christian sect of this name occurs in Irenaeus. They are mentioned more than once by Clement of Alexandria, who says that they are named from "Temperance". Hippolytus of Rome refers to them as "acknowledging what concerns God and Christ in like manner with the Church; in respect, however, of their mode of life, passing their days inflated with pride"; "abstaining from animal food, being water-drinkers and forbidding to marry"; "estimated Cynics rather than Christians". The 1913 Catholic Encyclopedia interprets this passage as implying that some Encratites were perfectly orthodox in doctrine. Origen says they did not acknowledge St. Paul’s Epistles.

== Later history ==
Somewhat later this sect received new life and strength by the accession of a certain Severus, after whom Encratites were often called Severians. These Severian Encratites accepted the Law, the Prophets, and the Gospels, but rejected the Book of the Acts and cursed St. Paul and his Epistles. But the account given by Epiphanius of the Severians rather betrays Syrian Gnosticism than Judaistic tendencies. They rejected marriage – declaring women and sex the work of Satan – and also intoxicants, calling wine "drops of venom from the great Serpent". Epiphanius states that in his day Encratites were very numerous throughout Asia Minor, in Pisidia, in the Adustan district of Phrygia, in Isauria, Pamphylia, Cilicia, and Galatia. In the Roman Province and in Syrian Antioch, they were found scattered in various places. They split up into a number of smaller sects of whom the Apotactics were remarkable for their condemnation of private property, the Hydroparastatæ or Aquarii for their use of water instead of wine in the Eucharist.

== Suppression ==
In the Edict of 382, Theodosius pronounced the sentence of death on all those who took the name of Encratites, Saccophori, or Hydroparastatæ, and commanded Florus, the Magister Officiorum, to make strict search for the Encratites, whom he considered Manichæan heretics in disguise.

== See also ==
- Acts of Philip: A book that Encratites may have written
- List of Gospels
- Prohibition in the United States

== Bibliography ==
- Gilles Quispel. "“The Study of Encratism: A Historical Survey,” in: Johannes van Oort (ed.), Gnostica, Judaica Catholica: Collected Essays of Gilles Quispel Leiden, Brill, 2008, pp. 329-363.
