= Saturninus of Antioch =

Second-century Gnostic Christian

Saturninus or Satornilus (Greek: Σατόρνινος active 100–120 AD) was an early Syrian Gnostic Christian from the 1st century Simonian school. He is quoted in the works of Irenaeus, Justin Martyr and Hegesippus. The movement he established was called Saturnians.

== Biography ==
He was supposed to be an apprentice of Menander, who had learned under Simon Magus and established a school in Antioch. Saturninus and Basilides were among his greatest students and went to teach after him, the former staying in Antioch and the latter moving to Alexandria.

Saturninus adhered to Menander's doctrines while Basilides developed them in different ways. However, while Menander called himself the messengers of God, Saturninus considered Jesus Christ the only who could receive this title, and therefore might have been the first teacher to introduce Christ in Gnosticism. At the same time, he also introduced the notion of the God of Judaism being an evil impostor, the Platonic idea of a descended spark of life, and the idea that there are different classes of men. Finally, Saturninus might have been the source of docetism mentioned by Ignatius of Antioch in his letters.

Saturninus endorsed harsh asceticism, committing to vegetarianism and celibacy, and was accused of introducing the idea of encratism.

== Doctrine ==
Saturninus preached that matter was impure, and that the world had been created by seven rebel angels (known as the planetary archons), the leader of which called himself the God of the Jews in imitation to the true God, the Father of all. However, while tyrannical, those angels weren't the main satanic figure, but neutral entities. Unlike Simon and Menander, Saturninus was a dualist, believing that God was opposed by an equal principle that would be Satan, distinct from the demiurgic archons.

After rebelling against God to create the world, the rebel angels would have switched their battle against Satan and his servants, who desired to dominate this creation. Man would have been created by the angels after a shining vision that appeared before them from above, but as they were unable to make him capable of standing erect, God took pity on them and helped their creation, inspiring a spark on life on some men. However, Satan would have intervened as well as the serpent of Eden, creating marriage and procreation, as well as making the rest of the men evil.

Men were initially ruled by the God of Jews, but as he was a false deity, and not powerful enough to shield them from Satan's influence, the true God would have sent a spirit savior, Jesus Christ. According to other versions, he was sent because the archons opposed the Father. In any case, since flesh was susceptible to evil, he was merely a docetic being, and through his presence he would have passed the knowledge to overthrow the God of Jews, destroy the wicked, and make the sparks of life return to the Higher God.

Saturninus might have been influenced by Zoroastrianism, as the dualism between God and Satan is similar to that of Ahura Mazda and Ahriman, while his seven angels would be similar to the Amesha Spenta. His demonization of the God of Jews, also done by his gnostic partners, might have been a consequence of the anti-Jewish sentiment caused among Christians and Romans by the Bar Kokhba revolt.
