= Simon Magus =

Religious figure who confronted Peter

- Σίμων ὁ μάγος
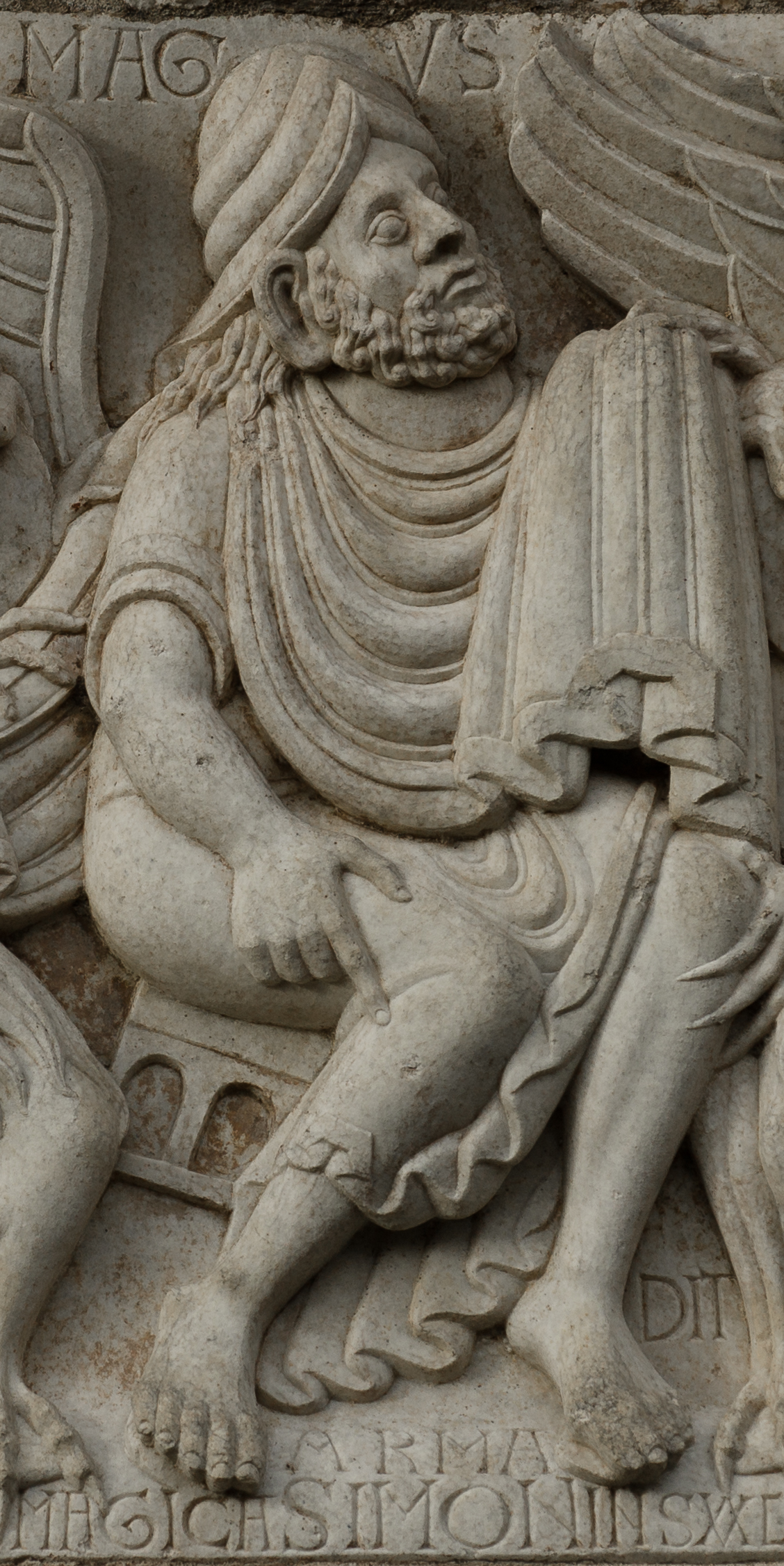
- Relief of Simon Magus at the gate of the Basilica of Saint-Sernin, Toulouse
- Title: Magus

Personal life
- Known for: Early Christian and proto-Gnostic figure; sometimes referred to as the 'founder' of Gnosticism, though this is incorrect

Religious life
- Religion: Early Christianity/proto-Gnosticism
- Founder of: Simonianism (polemic)

Simon Magus (Greek Σίμων ὁ μάγος, Latin: Simon Magus), was an early-1st century AD Samaritan, likely born in Gitta, Samaria, a village not far from Flavia Neapolis, modern Nablus. He was a contemporary of Jesus of Nazareth, John the Baptist, and the early Christian apostles. Almost all information about him is from Christian sources, where he is depicted as a sorcerer or magician with a substantial following in Samaria, as the founder of heresies, and as an antagonist of the apostles.

According to the Acts of the Apostles, Simon converted to Christ, and was baptised by Philip the Evangelist, later clashing with Saint Peter, after attempting to buy for money the power to invoke the Holy Spirit.

Simon becomes the subject of fantastic legends regarding his opposition to the apostles in apocryphal Christian texts. He appears in 2nd-century texts of Church Fathers such as Irenaeus, Justin Martyr, Hippolytus, and Epiphanius, where he is often described as the founder of the sect of Simonians, and of Gnosticism generally, and referred to as the "father of all heresies". These descriptions have been accepted by some modern scholars. Menander, who became the leader of the Simonians after Simon and acknowledged Simon as his teacher, was in turn the teacher of Basilides and Cerdo, two of the most prominent Gnostic teachers of the 2nd century. Other scholars say that the Church Fathers were incorrect in asserting that Simon was a Gnostic.

Justin, who was himself a 2nd-century Roman Gentile native of Flavia Neapolis in Samaria, wrote that by his time, nearly all the Samaritans were adherents of Simon of Gitta. Irenaeus believed him to have been the founder of the sect of Simonians, and the originator of Gnosticism.

Hippolytus quotes from a work he attributes to Simon or the Simonians, Apophasis Megale, or Great Declaration, which apart from these quotations is lost. As Hippolytus points out, the doctrine advanced in this work is an earlier form of Valentinus' doctrine. Simon is also supposed to have written several lost treatises, two of which bear the titles The Four Quarters of the World and The Sermons of the Refuter.

In apocryphal works, including the Acts of Peter, the Pseudo-Clementines, and the Epistle of the Apostles, Simon appears as a formidable sorcerer with the ability to levitate and fly at will. He is sometimes referred to as "the Bad Samaritan" due to his malevolent character. The Apostolic Constitutions also accuses him of "lawlessness" (antinomianism). In the Pseudo-Clementines he is portrayed as a leader within the John the Baptist movement, which evolved into the Simonians. Other modern scholars argue that in the Pseudo-Clementines, Simon is a stalking-horse for Paul the Apostle, with the writers masking their attacks on Paul as attacks on Simon.

The crime in canon law of simony, which is the buying and selling of church offices, is named after him, because in the Acts account, Simon attempts to purchase for money the power of conferring the Holy Spirit from the apostles.

== History ==
=== Acts of the Apostles ===
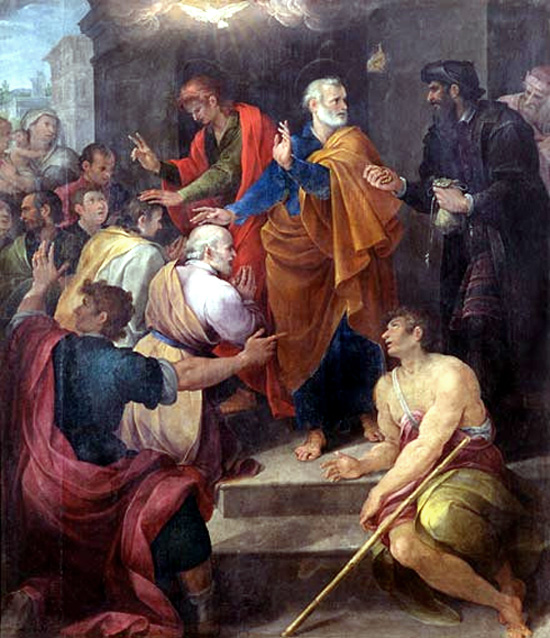
Peter's conflict with Simon Magus by Avanzino Nucci, 1620. Simon is on the right, wearing black.

Acts of the Apostles 8:9-24 features a short narrative about Simon Magus; this is his only appearance in the New Testament. It relates that Simon was a powerful sorcerer, who was baptised by Philip. After witnessing his own followers receiving the Holy Ghost from the apostles, Simon sought to buy the same power from the apostles, for which he was denounced by Peter.

=== Josephus ===
Josephus mentions a magician named Atomus (Simon in Latin manuscripts) as being involved with the procurator Felix, King Agrippa II and his sister Drusilla, where Felix has Simon convince Drusilla to marry him instead of the man she was engaged to. Some scholars have considered the two to be identical, although this is not generally accepted, as the Simon of Josephus is a Jew rather than a Samaritan.

=== Justin Martyr and Irenaeus ===
Justin Martyr (in his Apologies, and in a lost work against heresies, which Irenaeus used as his main source) and Irenaeus (Adversus Haereses) record that after being cast out by the Apostles, Simon Magus came to Rome where, having joined to himself a profligate woman of the name of Helen, he gave out that it was he who appeared among the Jews as the Son, in Samaria as the Father and among other nations as the Holy Spirit. He performed such signs by magic acts during the reign of Claudius that he was regarded as a god and honored with a statue on the island in the Tiber which the two bridges cross, with the inscription Simoni Deo Sancto, "To Simon the Holy God" (First Apology, XXVI). However, in the 16th century, a statue was unearthed on the island in question, inscribed to Semo Sancus, a Sabine deity, leading some scholars to conclude that Justin Martyr confused Semoni Sancus with Simon.

==== Myth of Simon and Helen ====
Justin and Irenaeus are the first to recount the myth of Simon and Helen, which became the center of Simonian doctrine. Epiphanius of Salamis also makes Simon speak in the first person in several places in his Panarion.

As described by Epiphanius, in the beginning God had his first thought, his Ennoia, which was female, and that thought was to create the angels. The First Thought then descended into the lower regions and created the angels. But the angels rebelled against her out of jealousy and created the world as her prison, imprisoning her in a female body. Thereafter, she was reincarnated many times, each time being shamed. Helen of Troy was one of her reincarnations. She finally reincarnated as Helen, a slave and prostitute in the Phoenician city of Tyre, whereupon God descended in the form of Simon Magus to rescue her and to confer salvation upon men through knowledge of himself. Special to the Simonian tale is the identification of Simon himself with the Supreme, and of his consort Helena with the female principle.

=== Hippolytus ===
In Philosophumena, Hippolytus retells the narrative on Simon written by Irenaeus (who in his turn based it on the lost Syntagma of Justin). Hippolytus demonstrates acquaintance with the folk tradition on Simon which depicts him as a magician rather than Gnostic, and in constant conflict with Peter (also present in the apocrypha and Pseudo-Clementine literature). Reduced to despair by the curse laid upon him by Peter in the Acts, Simon soon abjured the faith and embarked on the career of a sorcerer:

Hippolytus gives a much more doctrinally detailed account of the Simonians, with extensive quotations from the Apophasis Megale. These include a system of divine emanations similar to that of Valentinus, and interpretations of the Old Testament. Hippolytus says the Simonians held a free love doctrine in its purest form. Like Irenaeus, he describes magic arts practiced by the Simonians. Hippolytus mentions that the Simonians have images of Simon and Helen under the forms of Zeus and Athena, but enjoin the deity names from being applied to the images.

Scholars note that Hippolytus is a 3rd century source (220-230 AD) and that the Apophasis Megale fragments may have a theology that is too highly developed to be the authentic voice of a 1st-century Samaritan contemporary of the Apostles, demonstrating too much awareness of 2nd century Gnostic frameworks, such as Valentinus and Basilides. It is not unlikely that it was written by later Simonians rather than Simon himself.

=== Epiphanius ===
Epiphanius writes that Simonians are almost extinct in his day (c. AD 367). Epiphanius further charges Simon with having tried to wrest the words of St. Paul about the armour of God into agreement with his own identification of the Ennoia with Athena. He tells us also that he gave barbaric names to the "principalities and powers", and that Simon was the beginning of the Gnostics. The Law, according to him, was not of God, but of "the sinister power". The same was the case with the prophets, and it was death to believe in the Old Testament.

=== Cyril of Jerusalem ===
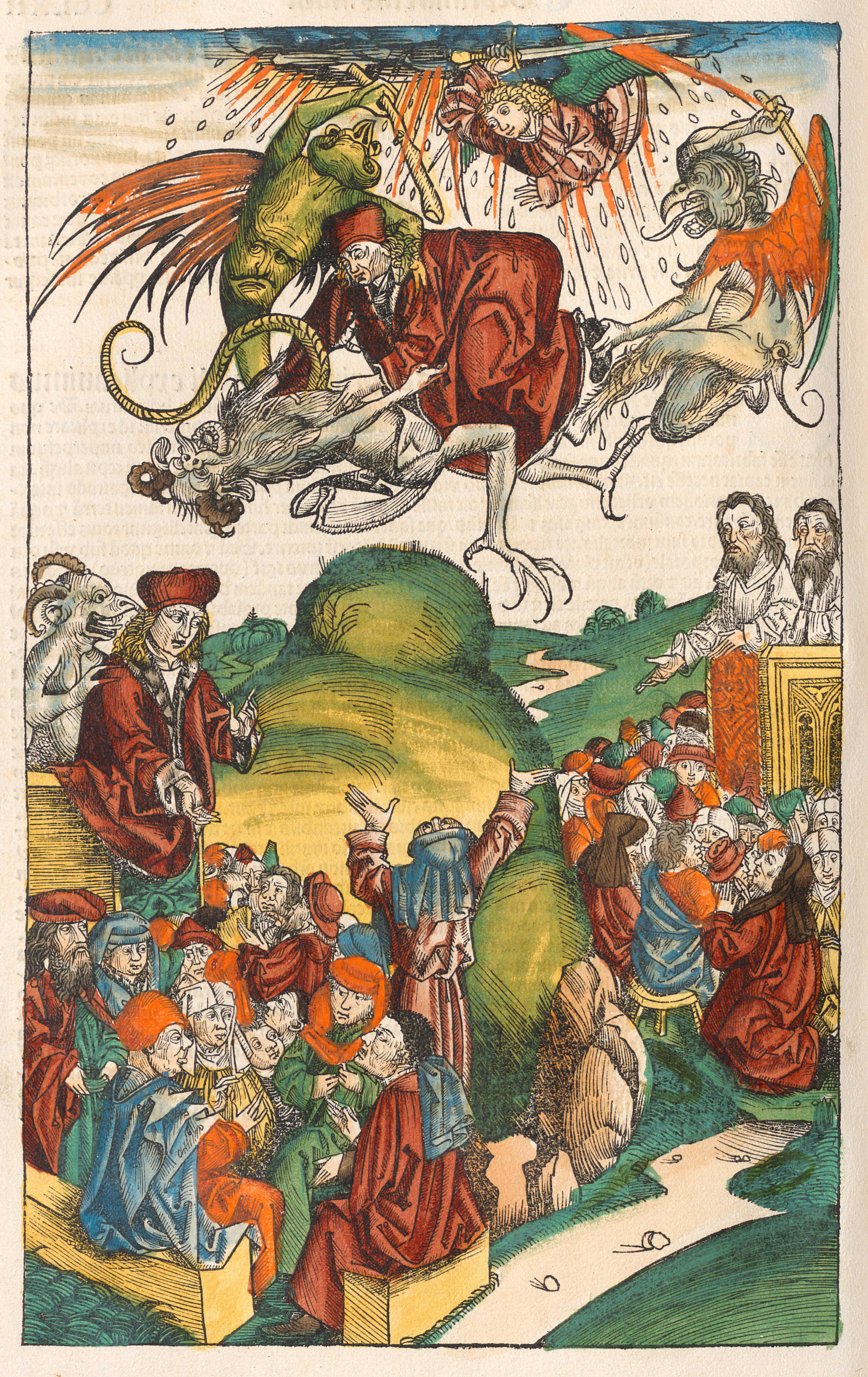
The death of Simon Magus, from the Nuremberg Chronicle

Cyril of Jerusalem (346 AD) in the sixth of his Catechetical Lectures prefaces his history of the Manichaeans by a brief account of earlier heresies: Simon Magus, he says, had claimed to have been translated to heaven, and was actually careening through the air in a chariot drawn by demons when the prayers of Peter and Paul brought him to earth as a mangled corpse.

== Apocrypha ==
=== Acts of Peter ===
The apocryphal Acts of Peter has an elaborate tale of Simon Magus' death. While performing magic in the Forum, in order to prove himself to be a god, Simon levitates into the air above the Forum. The apostle Peter prays to God to stop his flying, and Simon falls into a place called "the Sacra Via" ("Holy Way" in Latin), breaking his legs "in three parts". The previously non-hostile crowd then stones him. Gravely injured, he has himself carried on a bed at night to a person named Castor, a banished sorcerer. Simon dies "while being sorely cut by two physicians".

=== Acts of Peter and Paul ===
Another apocryphal document, the Acts of Peter and Paul gives a slightly different version of the above incident, which was shown in the context of a debate in front of the Emperor Nero. In this version, Paul the Apostle is present along with Peter, Simon levitates from a high wooden tower made upon his request, and dies "divided into four parts" due to the fall. Peter and Paul are then imprisoned by Nero, who further orders that Simon's body be kept carefully for three days, in case, Christ-like, the magician should rise again.

=== Pseudo-Clementine Literature ===
The Pseudo-Clementine Recognitions and Homilies give an account of Simon Magus and some of his teachings in regards to the Simonians. They are of uncertain date and authorship, most likely 3rd or 4th century CE, seem to have been worked over by several hands in the interest of diverse forms of belief, and are widely considered unreliable by scholars, at best reflecting the concerns and religious landscape of 4th century Syria, most likely not pristine memories of a 1st-century Samaritan sorcerer.

According to these texts, Simon's father was Antonius, and his mother Rachel. He studied Greek literature in Alexandria and, being a powerful sorcerer, became so ambitious that he wished to be considered a highest power, higher even than the God who created the world. Sometimes he "darkly hinted" that he himself was Christ, calling himself the Standing One, because he would stand for ever without bodily decay. He did not believe that the God who created the world was the highest, nor that the dead would rise. He denied Jerusalem, and introduced Mount Gerizim in its stead. In place of the Christ of the Christians he proclaimed himself; and the Law he allegorized in accordance with his own preconceptions. He did indeed preach righteousness and judgment to come.

A follower of John the Baptist, he is said to have become the most esteemed of John's thirty core followers. Another of these thirty leaders was a woman called Helen. On the death of John, Simon was in Egypt studying magic. Another one of the leaders, Dositheus, became the head of the John the Baptist sect by spreading a false report of Simon's death. When Simon returned, he initially acquiesed to the leadership of Dositheus, but undermined and eventually supplanted him. This was the beginning of the Simonians. Helen became Simon's mistress and was presented as Sophia, the Mother of All.

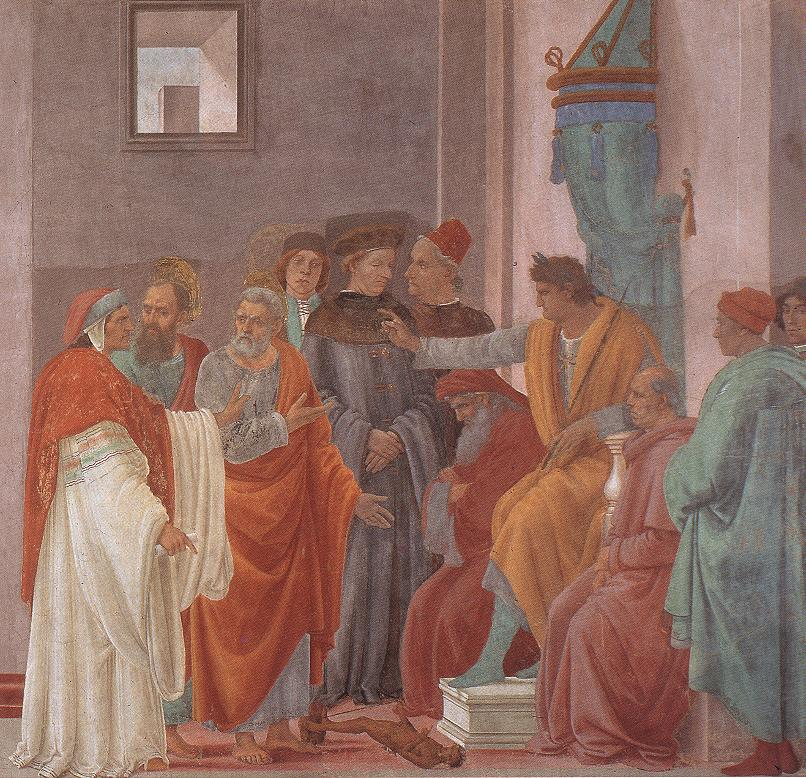
The Apostles Paul and Peter confront Simon Magus before Nero, as painted by Filippino Lippi.

The Pseudo-Clementine writings were used in the 4th century by members of the Ebionite sect, which refused to recognize Paul as an apostle. Ferdinand Christian Baur (1792–1860), founder of the Tübingen School, drew attention to this and pointed out that in the disputations between Simon and Peter in the Pseudo-Clementines, some of the claims of Simon were really those of Paul, suggesting that Peter's attacks on Simon masked a polemic against Paul. Jozef Verheyden countered that Simon and Paul have little in common. The majority of scholars accept Baur's argument, but others, including Joseph Lightfoot, argued extensively that the "Simon Magus" of the Pseudo-Clementines was not meant to stand for Paul.

More recently, Berlin pastor Hermann Detering (1995) has made the case that the veiled anti-Pauline stance of the Pseudo-Clementines has historical roots, that the Acts 8 encounter between Simon the magician and Peter is itself based on the conflict between Peter and Paul. This has not found general support among scholars, but Robert M. Price argues much the same case in The Amazing Colossal Apostle:The Search for the Historical Paul (2012).

Since Ferdinand Christian Baur in the 19th century, scholars including Hermann Detering and Margaret Barket have concluded that the attacks on "Simon Magus" in the 4th-century Pseudo-Clementines may be attacks on Paul. Detering takes the attacks of the Pseudo-Clementines as literal and historical, and suggests that the attacks of the Pseudo-Clementines are correct in identifying "Simon Magus" as a proxy for Paul of Tarsus, with Simon-Paul originally having been detested by the church, and the name changed to Paul when he was rehabilitated by virtue of forged Epistles correcting the genuine ones. Robert Price has stated his agreement with this assertion.

There are other features in the portrait of Simon which are reminiscent of Marcion. The first thing mentioned in the Homilies about Simon's opinions is that he denied that God was just. By "God" he meant the creator god. But he undertakes to prove from the Jewish scriptures that there is a higher god, who really possesses the perfections which are falsely ascribed to the lower god. On these grounds Peter complains that, when he was setting out for the gentiles to convert them from their worship of many gods upon earth, Satan had sent Simon before him to make them believe that there were many gods in heaven.

== Later interpretations ==
=== Druidism ===
In Irish legend, Simon Magus came to be associated with Druidism. He is said to have come to the aid of the Druid Mog Ruith. The fierce denunciation of Christianity by Irish Druids appears to have resulted in Simon Magus being associated with Druidism. The word Druid was sometimes translated into Latin as magus, and Simon Magus was also known in Ireland as "Simon the Druid".

=== Medieval legends ===
The church of Santa Francesca Romana, Rome, is claimed to have been built on the spot where Simon fell. Within the Church is a dented slab of marble that purports to bear the imprints of the knees of Peter and Paul during their prayer. The fantastic stories of Simon the Sorcerer persisted into the later Middle Ages, becoming a possible inspiration for the Faustbuch and Goethe's Faust.

The opening story in Danilo Kiš's 1983 collection The Encyclopedia of the Dead, "Simon Magus", retells the confrontation between Simon and Peter agreeing with the account in the Acts of Peter, and provides an additional alternative ending in which Simon asks to be buried alive in order to be resurrected three days later (after which his body is found putrefied).

== See also ==
- Apollonius of Tyana
- Elymas Bar-Jesus
- List of messiah claimants
- List of people who have claimed to be Jesus
- Saints and levitation
- Simon Magus in popular culture

== Bibliography ==
- Bockmuehl, Markus (2010). The Remembered Peter: In Ancient Reception and Modern Debate. Mohr Siebeck.
- Cartlidge, David R. (Fall 2005). "The Fall and Rise of Simon Magus". Bible Review. 21 (4): 24–36.
- Gruter, Janus (1707). Inscriptiones antiquae totius orbis romani, in absolutissimum corpus redactae. Amsterdam: Franciscus Halma.
- Haar, Stephen Charles (2003). Simon Magus: The First Gnostic?. Walter de Gruyter. ISBN 978-3-11-017689-6.
- Jonas, Hans (2001) [1958]. The Gnostic Religion (3rd ed.). Boston: Beacon Press. ISBN 0-8070-5801-7.
- Legge, Francis (1964) [1914]. Forerunners and Rivals of Christianity, From 330 B.C. to 330 A.D. (Two volumes bound as one ed.). New York: University Books. LCCN 64-24125.
- Litwa, M. David (2024). Simon of Samaria and the Simonians: Contours of an Early Christian Movement. London: T & T Clark. ISBN 978-0-5677-1295-0.
- Lüdemann, Gerd (1989). Early Christianity according to the Traditions in Acts: A Commentary. Minneapolis: Fortress Press.
- MacKillop, James (2004) [1998]. A Dictionary of Celtic Mythology. New York: Oxford University Press. ISBN 978-0-19-860967-4.
- Mead, G.R.S. (1892). Simon Magus. London: Theosophical Publishing Society.
- Pate, C. Marvin (2000). The Reverse of the Curse: Paul, Wisdom, and the Law.
- Plotinus (1921). Psychic and Physical Treatises: Comprising the Second and Third Enneads. Vol. 2. Stephen MacKenna. London: P.L. Warner, publisher to the Medici Society.
- Price, Robert M. (2012). The Amazing Colossal Apostle: The Search for the Historical Paul. Signature Books. ISBN 978-1-56085-216-2.
- Rudolph, Kurt (1977). Die Gnosis: Wesen u. Geschichte e. spätantiken Religion. Leipzig: Koehler & Amelang.
- Scholem, Gershom (1965). Jewish Gnosticism, Merkabah Mysticism, and Talmudic Tradition. Jewish Theological Seminary of America.
- Verheyden, Jozef (2004). "Demonization of the Opponent". In Hettema, Theo L.; van der Kooij, Arie (eds.). Religious Polemics in Context.
- Williams, Frank (1987). The Panarion of Epiphanius of Salamis. Vol. 2 volumes. Leiden; New York; København; Köln: E.J. Brill. ISBN 978-90-04-07926-7.
