= Basilides =

2nd century Christian Gnostic religious teacher

Basilides (Greek: Βασιλείδης) was an early Christian Gnostic religious teacher in Alexandria, Egypt who, according to Clement of Alexandria, was active between 117–161 AD, and claimed to have inherited his teachings from the apostle Saint Matthias. He was a pupil of either the Simonian teacher Menander, or a disciple of Peter called Glaucias. He is believed to have written a 24 book long commentary on the Christian Gospel entitled Exegetica (now all lost), as reported by Agrippa Castor, making him one of the earliest Gospel commentators. Origen, Jerome, and Ambrose mention a Gospel according to Basilides, but this is probably only a mischaracterization of the Exegetica.

The followers of Basilides, the Basilidians, formed a movement that persisted for at least two centuries after him – Epiphanius of Salamis, at the end of the 4th century, recognized a persistent Basilidian presence in the Nile Delta in Egypt. It is probable, however, that the school melded into the mainstream of Gnosticism by the latter half of the 2nd century.

== Doctrine ==
The two main sources for the mythological and philosophical system of Basilides are from the writings of Irenaeus and Hippolytus of Rome. However, these two sources starkly contradict one another. The consensus of historians previously favored the account of Hippolytus as more authentic, but the matter has become more contested in recent years, and some even consider both accounts as unreliable.

=== Theogony ===
According to Irenaeus, Basilides believed that the ungendered Father was the first principle. From the Father came a total of five emanations: the (1) Nous (Intellect) originated from the Father, the (2) Logos (Word) emanated from the Nous, (3) Phronesis (Prudence) emanated from the Logos, (4) Phronesis Sophia (Wisdom) emanated from Phronesis, and (5) Dynamis (Power) emanated from Phronesis Sophia. Clement of Alexandria specifies that Basilides believed in a primal Ogdoad, or eight primordial deities. This octet of beings is composed by "Justice" and its offspring "Peace" (which in the cosmology of Basilides are not mere human virtues). A second source confirming the belief in an Ogdoad by Basilides is the Testimony of Truth from the Nag Hammadi library. Basilides may have received the idea of an Ogdoad from a Jewish gnostic work in Alexandria.

=== Cosmology and cosmogony ===
Irenaeus reports that Basilides believed that Sophia and Dynamis created a group of angels, and these angels were responsible for the creation of the first heaven. Emanations of the first angels then created the second heaven. Emanations from the second angels created the third heaven, and so on, until 365 heavens were created. This, for Basilides, also explains why the number of days in a (solar) year was set at 365 (to reflect the number of heavens). This system of creator-angels creating a series of heavens in accordance with the number of days in a calendrical year is found in several other cosmologies, like that of Saturninus of Antioch, the Epistle of Eugnostos, and the long version of the Apocryphon of John. The world as it is known to humans corresponds to the final heaven, and was created by the final angelic emanation. The chief of this final set of emanations (also known as the Archon) is, in the view of Basilides, the God of the Jews, so called because he favors the Jewish people.

=== Jesus ===
Basilides and his followers largely accepted the biography of Jesus found in the canonical Gospels. One possible deviation, however, is claimed by Irenaeus: that Jesus was substituted on the cross with Simon of Cyrene during the walk to Golgotha. Simon was commissioned to carry the cross of Jesus during this walk, but at some point, their physical features were swapped. Simon was then crucified, while Jesus stood by, laughing and ridiculing them. However, M. David Litwa has argued that Irenaeus has confused the views of Basilides with those of others, such as the views found in the Second Treatise of the Great Seth. Irenaeus elsewhere reports that the Basilidian view was that the body of Jesus suffered on the cross, which is also confirmed by Clement of Alexandria's Stromata (4.12.83.1). The image of Jesus in the initial report of Irenaeus also does not fit well with the character of Jesus in Basilides' canonical sources (including him laughing while an innocent man is crucified in his place) and matches more with the attempts of other heresiologists, like Tertullian, to paint their opponents as rejecting the salvific death of Jesus.

=== Faith and Election ===
Like other gnostics, Basilides taught that salvation comes through knowledge and not faith. This knowledge, or gnosis, was considered esoteric, a revelation to human beings by the divine being, Jesus Christ. Faith played no part in salvation. Indeed, Basilides believed faith was merely "an assent of the soul to any of the things which do not excite sensation, because they are not present". He also believed faith was a matter of "nature," not of conscious choice, so that men would "discover doctrines without demonstration by an intellective apprehension". Basilides also appears to have accumulated forms of dignity in accordance with ones' faith.

Because Basilides believed faith was a matter of nature, doubtlessly he pushed election so far as to sever a portion of mankind from the rest, as alone entitled by Divine decree to receive a higher enlightenment. In this sense it must have been that he called "the elect a stranger to the world, as being by nature supermundane".

=== Metempsychosis ===
Basilides likewise brought in the notion of sin in a past stage of existence suffering its penalty here, "the elect soul" suffering "honourably through martyrdom, and the soul of another kind being cleansed by an appropriate punishment." To this doctrine of metempsychosis the Basilidians are likewise said to have referred the language of the Lord about requital to the third and fourth generations; Origen states that Basilides himself interpreted Romans 7:9 in this sense,

The Apostle said, 'I lived without a law once,' that is, before I came into this body, I lived in such a form of body as was not under a law, that of a beast namely, or a bird.

However, if there be any who suffers without previous sin, it will not be "by the design of an [adverse] power", but as suffers the babe who appears to have committed no sin. The infant is said to receive a benefit when it is subjected to suffering, "gaining" many hardships.

=== Hell ===
Origen complained that Basilides deprived men of a salutary fear by teaching that transmigrations are the only punishments after death.

=== Martyrdom ===
Because Basilides held to a fatalistic view of metempsychosis, he believed the Christian martyrs were being punished not for being Christians, but for sins they had committed in the past. This is why Origen says that he depreciated the martyrs.

=== Passions ===
The Basilidians were accustomed to call the passions Appendages, stating that these are certain spirits that append (προσηρτημένα) themselves to rational souls in a certain primitive turmoil and confusion. Then, they imitate the actions of those they are appended to, and not only acquire the impulses of the irrational animals, but even imitate the movements and beauties of plants. These Appendages can also have characteristics of habit [derived from stones], as the hardness of a diamond.

== Practices ==
=== Marriage ===
Reciting the views of different heretics on marriage, Clement gives specimens of the teaching of Basilides and his son Isidore, by way of rebuke to the immorality of the later Basilidians. He first reports the exposition of Matthew 19:12 (or a similar evangelic passage), in which there is nothing specially to note except the interpretation of the last class of eunuchs as those who remain in celibacy to avoid the distracting cares of providing a livelihood. He goes on to the paraphrase of 1 Corinthians 7:9, interposing in the midst an illustrative sentence from Isidore, and transcribes the language used about the class above mentioned.

But suppose a young man either poor or depressed, and in accordance with the word [in the Gospel] unwilling to marry, let him not separate from his brother; let him say 'I have entered into the holy place, nothing can befall me'; but if he have a suspicion, let him say, 'Brother, lay thy hand on me, that I may sin not,' and he shall receive help both to mind and to senses; let him only have the will to carry out completely what is good, and he shall succeed. But sometimes we say with the lips, 'We will not sin,' while our thoughts are turned towards sinning: such as one abstains by reason of fear from doing what he wills, lest the punishment be reckoned to his account. But the estate of mankind has only certain things at once necessary and natural, clothing being necessary and natural, but sexual intercourse natural, yet not necessary.

=== Epiphany ===
Although we have no evidence that Basilides, like some others, regarded Jesus's Baptism as the time when a Divine being first was joined to Jesus of Nazareth, it seems clear that he attached some unusual significance to the event. St. Hippolytus of Rome implied that Basilides regarded the Baptism as the occasion when Jesus received "the Gospel" by a Divine illumination.

"They of Basilides," says Clement, "celebrate the day of His Baptism by a preliminary night-service of [Scripture] readings." The Venice MS. states that the Basilidians celebrated the night before the Epiphany singing and flute-playing in a heathen temple at Alexandria: so that probably the Basilidian rite was a modification of an old local custom.

=== Meat offered to idols and apostasy ===
Eusebius of Caesarea, relying on Agrippa Castor, says Basilides "taught also that the eating of meat offered to idols and the unguarded renunciation of the faith in times of persecution were matters of indifference". Evidence from Clement's Stromata suggests Agrippa misunderstood Basilides' argument, partly from the doctrine and practice of later Basilidians; but it may also have had some justification in incidental words which have not been preserved. It appears as if Basilides was actually saying that the eating of meat offered to idols and apostasy weren't condemned for immorality, but were punishments because of immorality.

=== Silence ===
According to Agrippa Castor, Basilides "in Pythagorean fashion" prescribed a silence of five years to his disciples.

=== Prophets ===
Agrippa Castor stated that Basilides "invented prophets for himself named Barcabbas and Barcoph, and others that had no existence". The alleged prophecies apparently belonged to the apocryphal Zoroastrian literature popular with various Gnostics.

=== Traditions of Matthias ===
According to Basilides and Isidore, Matthias spoke to them mystical doctrines which he heard in private teaching from the Saviour. Origen also and after him Eusebius refer to a "Gospel" of or according to Matthias. The true name was apparently the Traditions of Matthias.

== Acts of the Disputation with Manes ==
The identity of the Basilides of the Acts with the Alexandrian has been denied by Gieseler with some show of reason. It is at least strange that our Basilides should be described simply as a "preacher among the Persians," a character in which he is otherwise unknown; and all the more since he has been previously mentioned with Marcion and Valentinus as a heretic of familiar name. On the other hand, it has been justly urged that the two passages are addressed to different persons. The correspondence is likewise remarkable between the "treatises" in at least thirteen books, with an interpretation of a parable among their contents, and the "twenty-four books on the Gospel" mentioned by Agrippa Castor, called Exegetica by Clement. Thus the evidence for the identity of the two writers may on the whole be treated as preponderating. But the ambiguity of interpretation remains; and it would be impossible to rank Basilides confidently among dualists, even if the passage in the Acts stood alone: much more to use it as a standard by which to force a dualistic interpretation upon other clearer statements of his doctrine.

== Isidorus ==
Hippolytus couples with Basilides "his true child and disciple" Isidore. He is there referring to the use which they made of the Traditions of Matthias; but in the next sentence he treats them as jointly responsible for the doctrines which he recites. Our only other authority respecting Isidore is Clement (copied by Theodoret), who calls him in like manner "at once son and disciple" of Basilides.

=== Expositions of the Prophet Parchor ===
Isidore's Expositions of the Prophet Parchor taught the higher thoughts of heathen philosophers and mythologers were derived from Jewish sources. So, by quoting the philosopher Pherecydes, who had probably a peculiar interest for Isidore as the earliest promulgator of the doctrine of metempsychosis known to tradition, Isidore was proving his validity as a descendant of the prophets.

Isidore's allegation that Pherecydes followed "the prophecy of Ham" was also used to claim that the apocryphal Zoroastrian books had quasi-biblical sanctity as proceeding from Zoroaster, a son of Noah; so Isidore gladly accepted the theory as evidence for his argument.

=== On an Adherent Soul ===
In his book On an Adherent Soul, Isidore appears to have argued against his father's teaching on "Appendages". He insists on the unity of the soul, and maintains that bad men will find "no common excuse" in the violence of the "appendages" for pleading that their evil acts were involuntary: "our duty is", he says, "by overcoming the inferior creation within us through the reasoning faculty, to show ourselves to have the mastery".

=== Ethics ===
A passage from Isidore's Ethics says: "Abstain, then, from a quarrelsome woman lest you are distracted from the grace of God. But when you have rejected the fire of the seed, then pray with an undisturbed conscience. And when your prayer of thanksgiving," he says, "descends to a prayer of request, and your request is not that in future you may do right, but that you may do no wrong, then marry."

== Legacy ==
Gnosticism was throughout eclectic, and Basilides superadded an eclecticism of his own. Antecedent Gnosticism, Greek philosophy, and the Christian faith and scriptures all exercised a powerful and immediate influence over his mind. It is evident at a glance that his system is far removed from any known form of Syrian or original Gnosticism. Like that of Valentinus, it has been remoulded in a Greek spirit, but much more completely.

Ancient writers usually name Basilides before Valentinus; but there is little doubt that they were at least approximately contemporaries, and it is not unlikely that Valentinus was best known personally from his sojourn at Rome, which was probably the last of the recorded stages of his life. There is at all events no serious chronological difficulty in supposing that the Valentinian system was the starting-point from which Basilides proceeded to construct by contrast his own theory, and this is the view which a comparison of doctrines suggests.

In no point, unless it be the retention of the widely spread term archon, is Basilides nearer than Valentinus to the older Gnosticism, while several leading Gnostic forms or ideas which he discards or even repudiates are held fast by Valentinus. Such are descent from above, putting forth or pullulation, syzygies of male and female powers, and the deposition of faith to a lower level than knowledge. Further, the unique name given by Basilides to the Holy Spirit, "the Limitary (μεθόριον) Spirit," together with the place assigned to it, can hardly be anything else than a transformation of the strange Valentinian "Limit".

The same softening of oppositions which retain much of their force even with Valentinus shows itself in other instances, as of matter and spirit, creation and redemption, the Jewish age and the Christian age, the earthly and the heavenly elements in the Person of Jesus. The strongest impulse in this direction probably came from Christian ideas.

An antecedent matter was expressly repudiated, the words of Genesis 1:3 eagerly appropriated, and a Divine counsel represented as foreordaining all future growths and processes; yet the chaotic nullity out of which the developed universe was to spring was attributed with equal boldness to its Maker: Creator and creation were not confused, but they melted away in the distance together. Nature was accepted not only as prescribing the conditions of the lower life, but as practically the supreme and permanent arbiter of destiny. Thus though faith regained its rights, it remained an energy of the understanding, confined to those who had the requisite inborn capacity; while the dealings of God with man were shut up within the lines of mechanical justice.

== Sources ==
The main sources of information about Basilides are accounts by various Church Fathers, including Eusebius in his Chronicon, the conflicting accounts offered by Irenaeus and Hippolytus of Rome, and excerpts from the lost writings of Basilides provided by Clement of Alexandria. Basilides' son, Isidore, was a disciple of his, and also wrote three works called On the Grown Soul, Ethics, and Expositions of the Prophet Parchor. However, these writings are lost and little is known about their contents. Other church fathers also wrote about him, but apart from these sources, they largely depended on other sources, or their views were more informed by the followers of Basilides they interacted with than by Basilides himself. For example, the earliest discussion of the mythological system of Basilides was in Against Heresies (1.24.3–7), by Irenaeus, which, in turn, was re-used by Pseudo-Tertullian (Adversus omnes haereses 1.5; Epiphanius, Panarion 24; Filastrius, Diversarum haereseon liber 32).

There is also a lost refutation of Basilides by Agrippa Castor, known only from the reference to and brief quotations from it by Eusebius.

=== Writings of Basilides ===
Nearly everything Basilides wrote has been lost, but the names of three of his works and fragments are available in the present day:

- The writings of Basilides and the writings of his followers were regularly quoted. 19 surviving fragments are known in total, 10 of which are about Basilides himself. Five of these fragments are from the fourth book of Clement's Stromata (fragments 7, 8, 10, 11, 12); two from the homilies of Origen (17, 18); and one from Hegemonius' Acta Archelai (19). The authenticity of a number of these fragments, however, remains a matter of debate among historians.
- Fragments of the Exegetica are available from St. Clement of Alexandria in his Stromata, Book IV, Chapter 12, and from Archelaus in his Acts of the Disputation with Manes, Chapter 55, and probably also from Origen in his Commentary on Romans V, Book I.
- Origen states that "Basilides had even the audacity to write a Gospel according to Basilides", and both St. Jerome and St. Ambrose repeat Origen. Yet no trace of a Gospel by Basilides exists elsewhere; and it is possible either that Origen misunderstood the nature of the Exegetica, or that the Gospel was known under another name.
- Origen in a note on Job, xxi, 1 sqq., speaks of "Odes" of Basilides.

=== Other works ===
Some fragments are known through the work of Clement of Alexandria:

- The Octet of Subsistent Entities (Fragment A)
- The Uniqueness of the World (Fragment B)
- Election Naturally Entails Faith and Virtue (Fragment C)
- The State of Virtue (Fragment D)
- The Elect Transcend the World (Fragment E)
- Reincarnation (Fragment F)
- Human Suffering and the Goodness of Providence (Fragment G)
- Forgivable Sins (Fragment H)

A book called Acts of the Disputation with Manes, which was written during the close of the 3rd century or later, speaks about the Basilidian origins of Manichaeism.

== Bibliography ==
Attribution

Primary sources

- St. Jerome (2008). Commentary on Matthew. Trans. Thomas P. Scheck. Catholic University of America Press. pp. 50–51. ISBN 978-0-8132-0117-7.
- Origen (1996). Homilies on Luke. Trans. Joseph T. Lienhard. Catholic University of America Press. p. 6. ISBN 978-0-8132-0094-1.
- Williams, Frank (1987). The Panarion of Epiphanius of Salamis. Vol. 1. Leiden; New York; København; Köln: E.J. Brill. p. 70 ff. ISBN 978-90-04-07926-7.
- St. Hippolytus of Rome (1921). Philosophumena. Trans. Francis Legge. New York: The Macmillan Company. pp. 73–74, 78.

Secondary sources

- Litwa, M. David (2022). Found Christianities: Remaking the World of the Second Century CE. T&T Clark.
- Mead, G.R.S. (1900). "The Basilidian Gnosis". Fragments of Faith Forgotten. London: The Theosophical Publishing Society.
- Pearson, Birger A. (2008). "Basilides the Gnostic". In Marjanen, Antti; Luomanen, Petri (eds.). A Companion to Second-Century Christian "Heretics". Leiden: Brill. pp. 1–31. ISBN 978-90-04-17038-4.
