= Askew =

Askew is an English surname. Notable people with the surname include:

== Sports people ==
- B. J. Askew (born 1980), American football player
- Billy Askew (born 1959), English footballer
- Carl Askew (born 1952), Australian motorcycle speedway and drag bike rider
- Dave Askew (born 1963), English darts player
- Dean Askew (born 1962), New Zealand cricketer
- John Askew (1908–1942), English rugby and cricket player
- Lynsey Askew (born 1986), English cricketer
- Matthias Askew (born 1982), American football player
- Oliver Askew (born 1996), American race car driver
- Philip Askew (born 1973), British ice dancer
- Rayshawn Askew (born 1979), American football player
- Sonny Askew (born 1957), American soccer player
- Tosh Askew, English rugby coach
- Vincent Askew (born 1966), American basketball player

== Other people ==
- Anne Askew (1521–1546), English poet and Protestant persecuted as a heretic
- Anthony Askew (fl. 1699–1774), English physician and book collector
- Barry Askew (1936–2012), English newspaper editor
- Christopher Crackenthorp Askew (23 May 1782 — 7 December 1848), Royal Navy Captain
- Desmond Askew (born 1972), English actor
- Ed Askew (1940–2025), American painter and singer-songwriter
- Edward Ayscu or Askew (1550–1616/17), English historian
- Egeon Askew (1576–unknown), English divine
- Felicity Askew (born 1899, date of death unknown), English sculptor
- George Edward Askew (died 1779), English dramatist and travel writer
- Sir Henry Askew (1775–1847), lieutenant-general in the British army
- Janet Askew (died 2015), New Zealand nurse
- John Bertram Askew (1869–1929), socialist translator
- Lucy Jane Askew (1883–1997), briefly the oldest person in Europe
- Luke Askew (1932–2012), American actor
- Reginald Askew (1928–2012), British Anglican priest and academic
- Reubin Askew (1928–2014), American politician, governor of Florida
- Rilla Askew (born 1951), American novelist and short story writer
- Steve Askew (born 1957), English guitarist, formerly with Kajagoogoo
- Terry Askew, creator of British children's sci-fi audio series The Space Gypsy Adventures
- Valerie Askew (1939–2020), British modelling agent
- Walter "Salty Walt" Askew, American sea shanty singer
- William Askew (1490–1541), juror in the trial of Anne Boleyn, father of Anne Askew
- Claire Askew (born 1986), British author

== See also ==
- Askew, Mississippi, an unincorporated community
- Askew Codex, ancient parchment of gnostic writings
- Askew Institute on Politics and Society in Florida
- Askew School of Public Administration and Policy in Florida
- View Askew Productions - American film production studio
- Margaret Fell (née Askew), leading member of the Religious Society of Friends (Quakers)
