= Untitled Text =

Gnostic text

The Untitled Text in the Bruce Codex—also called the Untitled Treatise, the Untitled Apocalypse, and The Gnosis of the Light—is a Gnostic text. When James Bruce acquired the codex in Egypt in 1769, "very little knowledge" was available about this period of Gnostic Christianity. It was one of the few known surviving Gnostic works until the discovery of the Nag Hammadi library in 1945. Carl Schmidt described the text's author as having "full knowledge of Greek philosophy" and being "full of the doctrine of the Platonic ideas."

== Background ==
James Bruce purchased the Bruce Codex near Medinet Habu, Upper Egypt, around 1769. It contained text in Coptic, Arabic, and Geʽez. Carl Gottfried Woide transcribed the entire codex in 1776. The Bodleian Library obtained the codex in 1848, and in 1886 they bound the texts together. Between Woide's transcription of the codex and the 1970s, seven leaves disappeared altogether, and there is significant damage throughout the manuscripts. Among the texts in the Bruce Codex were the Untitled Text and the Books of Jeu.

The manuscript in the Bruce Codex is a Coptic translation of an older Greek original. The existing Coptic manuscript of the Untitled Text probably dates to around 350 CE, and an original Greek manuscript may date to the late third century. It is written in the Sahidic dialect. It contains 31 leaves in uncial script on dark, reddish papyrus, including eight fragmentary leaves and four missing leaves. There are five leaves that do not clearly correspond with any portions of the text, so they have been variously placed by editors at the beginning or end of the text. The text may be several texts compiled together; in Schmidt 1978's edited sequence, chapter 21 is possibly a different version of the text that recounts the same stories as earlier chapters.

== Summary ==
The opening of the text describes the First Father as the king of unassailables and the first source who cannot be understood. He gave form to the All within himself and is the source of all. The demiurge is the Father of the All and oversees the aeons, which are a crown upon his head. The Father creates through the breath of his mouth and commands the All, creating the holy Pleroma with four gates. There are many beings and rulers in the Pleroma, including the forefather, Adam, and the perfect mind. The indivisible one has three aspects and contains an only-begotten one with triple powers. The immeasurable deep has a table with three greatnesses and a sonship called Christ the Verifier with twelve aspects and twelve sources called rational sources.

The text describes the deep of Setheus, which has twelve fatherhoods with three aspects each. The only-begotten one is hidden within Setheus and has twelve fatherhoods in his right hand and thirty powers in his left, giving light to the aeons. The monad has twelve monads, ten decads, nine enneads, and seven hebdomads. The only-begotten God is in the monad, which is in Setheus. The creative Word commands the All to work, and the grace of the aeons of the light was granted to some and taken away from others. Watchers were sent to helpers to those who believed in the light-spark.

The text describes the indivisible one's crown, which contains every species and gnosis and gives power to every power, prayed for by all the immortal ones. The god-begetting land is described, where all powers receive crowns upon their heads, and the Paralemptores (receivers) are known by the crowns upon their heads. The only-begotten one hidden in the indivisible one commands twelve beneficent ones with crowns upon their heads who bless the only-begotten king and receive the unfading crown. There are multiple enneads and fatherhoods, each with their own rules and monads. The immeasurable deep, surrounded by 365 fatherhoods, is where the year was divided.

The text describes the roles of an all-visible being and a mother figure in assigning rank and bestowing crowns to believers. The mother figure sets up the self-father and the protogenitor son, who is given the power to create worlds and an aeon called imperishability and Jerusalem. The father of the all sends a crown and an ineffable garment to the protogenitor, who gives light to all and gathers them into the form of a veil. The text also explores the concept of the existent being separated from the non-existent, and the mother is placed as head with purifying powers and a hidden all-womb. The forefather is given the authority of fatherhood, powers to make all things live and perish, and a power out of the aeon called Solmistos.

The text describes the forefather's powers, which were given to him in the aeon of the mother, and his creation of a great aeon, where he placed all the powers he received. He wished to turn the All towards the hidden Father and cried out for his children to bring forth Christ. The mother established her first-born son, gave him hosts of angels and archangels, twelve powers to serve him, and a garment containing all bodies. The protogenitor divided all matter, raised up myriad kinds, and gave law to them to love and honor God. The mother of the All, forefather, self-father, protogenitor, and powers of the aeon of the mother sang a great song of praise and blessing to the One Alone, praying for ranks and ordinances for their offspring, while those who fled from the matter of the aeon received praise, joy, and knowledge of the true God.

The text describes the prayer of the mother to the infinite and unknowable one who sends a power from the Man they desire to see, the Lord of Glory. He separates matter into two parts, the land of life and the land of death, and grants eternal life and immortality to those who worship him. The beings begotten of matter rejoice in their existence and pray for authority to create their own aeons and worlds. God sends powers of discernment to establish ranks and create a dwelling place, which is described as a place of repentance and immersion in the name of the self-begotten one who is God over them. Within this dwelling place are the aeons of the Sophia, truth, and the pre-existent living Jesus, and powers are placed over the living water to purify those who come to this dwelling place.

== Analysis ==
While many scholars place the Untitled Text in the Sethian school of Gnosticism, it was likely written after other Sethian works and has influences from Valentinianism (such as two divine mothers). The writing has a significant amount of similarities with Zostrianos, an apocalyptic and neoplatonist text found near Nag Hammadi. The similarities are so substantial—their shared descriptions of Aeons, of celestial "judges", of Michar and Micheau, and occasional identical wording—that scholar Dylan M. Burns writes that the texts demonstrate "literary dependence, although its direction cannot be ascertained". It also shares theological similarities with Numenius of Apamea, particularly Numenius's conception of a second god, which was common in late Platonist philosophy.
