= Pistis Sophia =

Gnostic text

Pistis Sophia (Koine Greek: Πίστις Σοφία) is a Gnostic text discovered in 1773, possibly written between the 3rd and 4th centuries AD. G. R. S. Mead documented that Carl Schmidt and Adolf von Harnack attributed it to the Ophite school. The existing manuscript, which some scholars place in the late 4th century, relates one Gnostic group's teachings of the transfigured Jesus to the assembled disciples, including his mother Mary, Mary Magdalene, and Martha. (In this context, "transfigured" refers to Jesus after his death and resurrection, not the event during his life where he spoke to appearances of Moses and Elijah on a mountain.) In this text, the risen Jesus had spent eleven years speaking with his disciples, teaching them only the lower mysteries. After eleven years, he receives his true garment and is able to reveal the higher mysteries revered by this group. The prized mysteries relate to complex cosmologies and knowledge necessary for the soul to reach the highest divine realms.

Much of the first two books of the manuscript are dedicated to outlining the myth of the fall and restoration of the figure known as Pistis Sophia, in particular giving detailed parallels between her prayers of repentance and particular Psalms and Odes of Solomon.

Although in many Gnostic texts and systems Sophia is a major female divinity, in Pistis Sophia she originates and dwells outside of the divine realm. Her fall and redemption parallel that found in versions of the Sophia myth such as that in the Apocryphon of John, but the actions all take place in the material aeons, and she can only be restored to her place in the thirteenth aeon, outside the Kingdom of Light.

== The Askew Codex ==
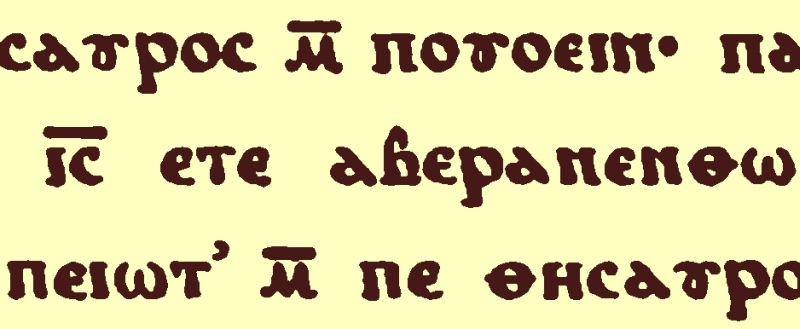
The phrase "Jesus, who is called Aberamentho" in the original Coptic

Pístis Sophía has been preserved in a single Coptic language manuscript originally comprising 178 leaves of parchment, but currently consisting of 174 leaves. This "Askew Codex" was purchased by the British Museum (now British Library) in 1785 from collector Anthony Askew. The Greek title Pístis Sophía was assigned by Carl Gottfried Woide, based on a title at the beginning of Book 2, "The Second Book of the Pistis Sophia," which was added by a later hand. Carl Schmidt suggests Τεύχη τοῦ Σωτῆρος "Books of the Saviour", based on a title found at the end of the same book.

The expression Pístis Sophía is obscure, and its English translations varied: "The Wisdom of Faith", "Faith Wisdom", "Wisdom in Faith", or "Faith in Wisdom". To some later Gnostics, Sophia was a divine syzygy of Christ, rather than simply a word meaning wisdom, and this context suggests the interpretation "The Faith of Sophia", or "The Loyalty of Sophia". Both the Berlin Codex and a papyrus codex at Nag Hammadi have an earlier, simpler Sophia wherein the transfigured Christ explains Pístis obscurely:

Again, his disciples said: "Tell us clearly how they came down from the invisibilities, from the immortal to the world that dies?" The perfect Saviour said: "Son of Man consented with Sophia, his consort, and revealed a great androgynous light. Its male name is designated 'Saviour, begetter of all things'. Its female name is designated 'All-begettress Sophia'. Some call her 'Pistis'"

The work is divided into several parts, with debate as to the number of parts. The most common view is that the work consists of four books, but some have posited as many as five or six books. Additionally, the codex contains two fragments in a later hand that are not directly connected to any of the main books.

Until the discovery of the Nag Hammadi library in 1945, the Askew Codex was one of three codices that contained almost all of the Gnostic writings that had survived the suppression of such literature both in East and West, the other two codices being the Bruce Codex and the Berlin Codex. Aside from these primary sources, everything written about gnosticism before the Nag Hammadi library became available is based on quotes, characterizations, and caricatures in the writings of the enemies of Gnosticism. The purpose of these heresiological writings was polemical, presenting gnostic teachings as absurd, bizarre, and self-serving, and as an aberrant heresy from a proto-orthodox and orthodox Christian standpoint.

== Text ==
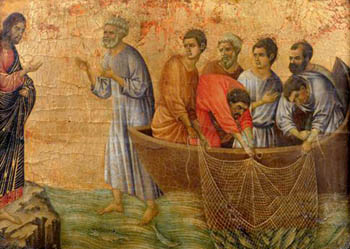
Jesus appears to his disciples after the resurrection

The work as a whole shows clear signs of having been compiled from multiple sources, with only the first two books following directly on each other. Even within a single book, occasionally multiple, differing accounts of a single event or cosmological outline appear, suggesting the use and preservation of several sources. Changes in terminology and cosmological description between books also shows that it is a compilation of texts that may have been written over a period of some time.

The bulk of the text (Books 1-3) is in the form of a dialogue between Jesus and the disciples, both male and female. Mary Magdalene is the most featured disciple, who provides many questions and scriptural interpretations; John “the Virgin” is the second most prominent. Other figures named as followers include Andrew, Bartholomew, James, John, Mary the mother of Jesus, Martha, Matthew, Peter, Philip, Salome, Simon the Canaanite, and Thomas.

=== First Book ===
The first book (Chapters 1-62) establishes that Jesus remained with the disciples for 11 years after the resurrection, teaching them only the lowest of the mysteries. At a certain point, he ascends and traverses the aeons, defeating the wicked archons, before returning to speak with the disciples further. It connects Jesus’ actions to the effectiveness of astrologers in the world – it suggests he has reduced, but not eliminated, the effectiveness of astrological magic. This leads into the introduction of the myth of Pistis Sophia's fall and restoration, which takes up the bulk of both the first and second book. Pistis Sophia recites several prayers/repentances, and after each one a disciple interprets the repentance in light of one of the Psalms or Odes of Solomon.

Unlike other versions of the Gnostic myth, such as the Apocryphon of John, here Pistis Sophia is a being of the lower, material aeons. This is significant in distinguishing the theology of this book from other Gnostic systems – it prioritizes its own, distinct cosmology and mythology above the Sophia myth, which to this author represents inferior, material struggles.

=== Second Book ===
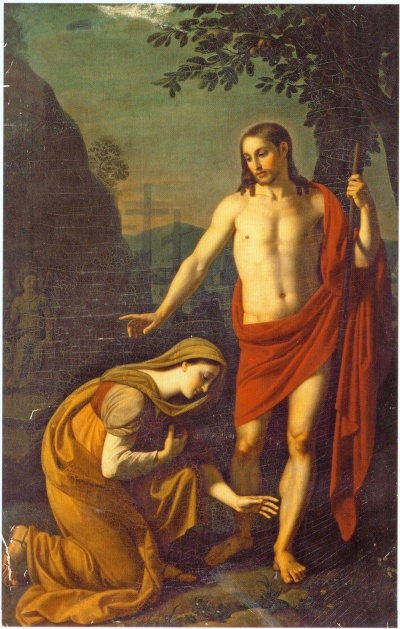
Jesus with Mary Magdalene

This book makes up Chapters 63-101. After the conclusion of the story of Pistis Sophia, the text turns to lengthy explanations of cosmology and the knowledge offered by the mysteries of this author's system. The end of the book also suggests the close connection of this work with the Books of Jeu found in the Bruce Codex (Chapter 99).

=== Third Book ===
The third book (Chapters 102-135) is mostly concerned with presenting an ethical or lifestyle code for adherents of the text. It outlines what is needed for right thought and right action, as well as actions that are not acceptable and their punishments. It also discusses at length the dissemination of the mysteries, repentance, and when it is or is not permissible to grant the mysteries to others. Finally, it discusses the formation of the human being, its components, and how they are connected. Again the Books of Jeu are referenced (Chapter 134), with the stipulation that they contain mysteries that are necessary for all, including the righteous.

=== Fourth Book ===
Part one of this book (Chapters 136-143) deals with cosmological and astrological speculation, and ritual development. It presents a myth of fallen archons of the aeons being imprisoned within the zodiacal sphere; outlines five realms of punishment (the Midst) and the types of sinners each holds; and gives specific configurations of the planets in the zodiac that allow souls to be released from each region. Jesus also interprets the elements of his incarnation and their role in the world, and administers the “baptism of the first offering” to his disciples.

The second part of what is commonly thought of as the fourth book (chapters 144-148) appears after a lacuna in the text, and is probably part of a separate book. Its cosmology is different from the preceding text, and it focuses entirely on the destiny of various types of souls and the punishments of sinners. Some of the sins listed are duplicates from part one of book four, but list different punishments. It is also speculated that an evil being pulled her from the 13th out of envy for her beautiful creations and she has to fight her to get to her home universe. In the end she is successful.

== Cosmology ==
Cosmology is a primary focus of the Pistis Sophia – learning the structure of the universe and how to traverse it is considered key in these texts, and the cosmology is one of the most complex from any Gnostic text remaining today. Summarizing the cosmology is further complicated because the structure is slightly different in each of its separate books, with certain realms added and removed.

Some scholars have suggested cosmologies encompassing the entirety of the codex; recently an outline has been made looking at the cosmology of each text individually. A general overview could be seen as:

- The Treasury of Light (the place of the right; separate regions in Books 1 & 2 only)
- The Midst (mesos)
- The thirteenth aeon (excluded in Book 3 and part two of Book 4)
- The twelve aeons/heimarmene (separate regions in Books 1 & 2 only)
- The first sphere (Books 1 & 2 only)
- The firmament (Books 1 & 2 only)
- Amente (Book 3 and part two of Book 4 only)
- Chaos (Book 3 and part two of Book 4 only)
- The Midst (mhte) (Books 3 & 4 only)
- The Outer Darkness (Books 3 & 4 only)

Notably, the portion of Books 1 & 2 dealing with the myth of Pistis Sophia's fall and redemption use a different cosmology from the rest of those books. The most controversial point in this alternate cosmological conception is reference to the thirteenth aeon, Pistis Sophia's home, as a place of “righteousness;” this view of the thirteenth aeon is absent from the rest of the text.

In Books 1-3, all the regions except for the punishment realms are also known as the Spaces of the First Mystery, and in Books 1 & 2, all the regions from the thirteenth aeon downward are considered the Outer Darkness.

Generally speaking, the aeonic realms represent the material universe, bounded by the stars and the zodiac. The Midst is the space dividing this region from the upper realms, and is sometimes a waiting space for souls before being allowed to enter the light realms. The goal of the soul is to ascend beyond the aeons and enter the upper realms of light. This is achieved by receiving the mysteries offered by the group represented by these texts.

The mysteries are not explicitly listed in the text; an initiate would most likely have to prove him or herself worthy by living for some period according to the ethical guidelines provided in the texts before undergoing the baptisms and gaining access to the mysteries. The Books of Jeu are noted as a source of the mysteries; it is probable that the texts found in the Bruce Codex are very similar, if not identical, with these texts.

== Key figures ==
=== Pistis Sophia ===
The story of Pistis Sophia's fall and restoration (chapters 29-82) dominates much of Books 1 & 2. She dwells in the thirteenth aeon, is tricked into leaving her aeon and descending into Chaos, has her light-power stolen, and is not allowed to return to her place until Jesus ascends through the aeons. She recites many repentances and prayers, and is repeatedly persecuted by wicked archontic beings before being allowed to wait just outside of the thirteenth aeon for restoration.

It is noteworthy that she is not a divine being, as portrayed in other versions of the Gnostic myth such as the Apocryphon of John. She is a being of the material aeons, and her restoration is only as far as the thirteenth material aeon. The myth as a whole seems to have been adopted to address the beliefs of another Gnostic group, and to assert the superiority of this text's system: humans who receive the mysteries of this group can surpass Pistis Sophia and reach the divine realms of light.

=== Authades ===
Authades is the equivalent of Ialdabaoth/the demiurge in versions of the Sophia myth such as that found in the Apocryphon of John. Unlike Ialdabaoth, he is not created by the Sophia figure, and in fact he holds a slightly higher hierarchical position than Pistis Sophia. His sin is wishing to rule all the material aeons, and he grows jealous when Pistis Sophia chooses to worship the light rather than continuing the ways of the aeons. Authades appears only in the chapters dealing with the Sophia myth; elsewhere Sabaoth the Adamas is the representative of evil in these texts.

=== Jesus ===
Jesus serves as a teacher or instructor, teaching his disciples information about the divine world they will need to progress to a higher state of being, as well as knowledge of the cosmic realms, their inhabitants, and their functions. He teaches the disciples baptismal rites, and instructs them to give these rites to all who show themselves worthy. He is closely tied to the highest divine being. However, little significance is given to his earthly incarnation – the ritual bread and wine in the baptism is not associated with the Christian Eucharist, and the crucifixion and resurrection play little role. Here, he only gains his true garment and teaches the disciples the higher mysteries eleven years after his resurrection – downplaying versions of Christianity claiming his earlier teachings as ultimate truth.

=== Jeu ===
This is the demiurge of these texts. Jeu dwells in the Treasury of Light and organizes the cosmos. He places the archons and the aeons in their proper places, and assigns powers to the planets, effectively offering a divine origin for astrology. This is particularly noteworthy given the anti-cosmic nature of some other Gnostic groups.

He is sometimes referred to as the “Father of Jesus’ Father.” Jeu is considered the father of the Great Sabaoth, the Good, who provides the soul to Jesus’ earthly incarnation – thus Jeu is the father of Jesus’ earthly father. The divine Jesus’ true father remains the highest, ineffable God.

=== Zorokothora Melchisedek ===
Often referred to simply as Melchisedek, this figure also dwells in the Treasury of Light or Place of the Right. His primary role is overseeing transport of light from the lower realms to the higher light realms as it becomes purified. His subordinates also deliver certain souls out of the punishment regions when believers on Earth pray for them.

=== The Great Sabaoth, the Good ===
As mentioned above, this figure provides a power or soul for Jesus’ earthly incarnation, making him effectively Jesus’ earthly father. This role is most widely discussed through extensive interpretations of Psalm 85:10-11 in Chapters 62-63.

=== Sabaoth, the Adamas ===
This is the primary representative of evil or wickedness in the majority of the Pistis Sophia. He is accused of inappropriate sexual conduct, begetting archons and other beings, and as a result he is imprisoned in the bounds of the zodiac, or the material universe. For those human souls who did not receive the mysteries before death and are thus bound to be reincarnated in the world, he is also responsible for giving the “cup of forgetfulness,” denying them the knowledge they had acquired from previous lives and punishments.

== Editions of the Coptic text ==
- Pistis Sophia opus gnosticum Valentino adiudicatum e codico manuscripto coptico Londinensi [Pistis Sophia: a gnostic work awarded to Valentinus from a Coptic manuscript codex in London] (in Latin). Translated by Schwartze, Moritz Gotthilf. Berlin: Julius Heinrich Petermann. 1851. OCLC 1100168976. First edition in Coptic with a Latin translation. This work of Schwartze was published postum by Petermann.
- Schmidt, Carl, ed. (1905). Die Pistis Sophia. Die beiden Bücher des Jeû. Unbekanntes altgnostisches Werk (in German). Vol. Band 1 Die Pistis Sophia. Leipzig: Hinrichs.
- Schmidt, Carl, ed. (1925). Pistis Sophia, ein gnostisches Originalwerk des dritten Jahrhunderts aus dem Koptischen übersetzt. In neuer Bearbeitung mit einleitenden Untersuchungen und Indices (in German). Leipzig: Hinrichs. 4th ed. Berlin 1981. German translation.
- Schmidt, Carl, ed. (1925). Pistis Sophia (in German). Vol. Coptica 2, Hauniae. Gyldendalske Boghandel-Nordisk Forlag. German introduction and Coptic text.
- Schmidt, Carl; MacDermot, Violet, eds. (1978). Pistis Sophia. Vol. Nag Hammadi Studies 9. Leiden: E. J. Brill. ISBN 9004056351.
