= Christopher Crackenthorp Askew =

British Royal Navy officer (1782–1848)

Capt. Christopher Crackenthorp Askew
- Born: 23 May 1782
- Died: 7 December 1848 (aged 66)
- Spouse: Sarah
- Relatives: Lieut.-Gen. Sir Henry Askew (uncle)

Capt. Christopher Crackenthorp Askew (23 May 1782 – 7 December 1848) was a British naval officer who fought in the French Revolutionary Wars and Napoleonic Wars.

Askew was the third surviving son of John Askew of Pallinsburn House, Northumberland, by Bridget, daughter and heiress of John Watson, of Goswick. His uncle was Lieut.-Gen. Sir Henry Askew.

Askew entered the Royal Navy on 21 February 1795 and shortly afterwards accompanied a squadron under Sir Home Popham, having for its object the destruction of the locks and sluice-gates of the Bruges canal. He took part in the Battle of Copenhagen, 2 April 1801; assisted at the capture of two privateers, carrying between them 40 guns and 256 men; and, in 1805, accompanied Lord Nelson to the West Indies and back in pursuit of the combined fleets of France and Spain. On 4 February 1805, he appears to have been on board a prize forming part of a convoy under the protection of HMS Arrow and HMS Acheron, when those vessels were captured after brave resistance against two French frigates.

He was promoted to Lieutenant, 27 November 1805, under Vice-Admiral John Holloway and then joined HMS Dictator under Capt. James Macnamara. On 30 December 1806, he joined HMS Thalia under Captains James Walker, Thomas Manby, and James Giles Vashon. During his continuance in the Thalia, of which he ultimately became Acting-Captain, Askew proceeded to Davis Strait in supposed pursuit of two French frigates, and on his return to Europe, after a fruitless exposure of several weeks to many severe hardships, and a prolonged stay on the coast of Labrador, attended the 1809 expedition to Flushing. Being promoted, when subsequently in the West Indies, to the rank of Commander, 26 November 1811, Capt. Askew next served, from 7 June 1814, to 9 October 1815, in HMS Shamrock. His last appointment was, 22 May 1821, to HMS Martin, fitting for the Mediterranean, where he remained, until posted, 19 July 1822. He accepted retirement 1 October 1846.

Capt. Askew married, 13 February 1828, Sarah, third daughter of Patrick Dickson, of Whitecross, Berwick-upon-Tweed. He died in 1848 at Broadbush House near Petersfield.
