= Egeon =

Egeon may refer to:

- Dodona egeon, a butterfly found in India
- Egeon Askew, English divine of the 16th and 17th centuries
- Egeon, a character in A Comedy of Errors by William Shakespeare
