= Edward Askew =

Edward Askew may refer to:

- Edward Ayscu (1550–1617), English historian
- Edward Askew Sothern (1826–1881), English actor
