= Setheus =

In Gnosticism, Setheus is one of the great celestial powers dwelling in the Sixth Heaven.

== Attestation in the Bruce Codex ==
The ancient Gnostic text known as the Bruce Codex was discovered near Alexandria, Egypt in 1769 and translated into German in 1892 by Carl Schmidt. An English translation of the text with Schmidt's commentary was published in 1978, with translation and notes by Violet Macdermot. All references to Setheus are contained within 'The Untitled Text,' one of the 3 books contained within the Codex. In Chapter Eight, the text describes Setheus:

"This truly is the only-begotten God. This is he whom the All knew. They became God, and they raised up his name : God. This is he of whom John spoke: "In the beginning was the Word and the Word was with God and the Word was God. This is the one without whom nothing exists, and that which has come into existence in him is life." This is the only-begotten one in the monad, dwelling in it like a city. And this is the monad which is in Setheus like a concept.

This is Setheus who dwells in the sanctuary like a king, and he is as God. This is the creative Word which commands the All that they should work. This is the creative Mind, according to the command of God the Father. This is he to whom the creation prays as God, and as Lord, and as Saviour, and as one to whom they have submitted themselves. This is he at whom the All marvels because of his beauty and comeliness. This is he whom the All - those within being a crown upon his head, and those outside at his feet, and those of the midst surrounding him - bless, saying; "Holy, Holy, Holy art Thou, Thou art living within those that live, thou art holy within the holy ones, thou dost exist within those that exist, and thou art the father within the fathers, and thou art God within the gods, and thou art Lord within the lords, and thou art a place within all the places" And they bless him, saying :"Thou art the house, and thou art the dweller in the house." And they bless him again, saying to the Son who is hidden within him : "Thou art existent, thou art the only-begotten one, the light and the life and the grace (Charis)."

== See also ==
- Angel
- Archangel
- Bruce Codex
- Shitil
