= Heimarmene =

Goddess in Greek mythology

Heimarmene or Himarmene (/haɪˈmɑːrmɪniː/; Ancient Greek: Εἱμαρμένη) is a goddess and being of fate/destiny in Greek mythology (in particular, the orderly succession of cause and effect, or rather, the fate of the universe as a whole, as opposed to the destinies of individual people). She belongs to a family of similar beings of destiny and fate, which have given us various modern concepts (such as Aesa, Moira, Moros, Ananke, Adrasteia and Pepromene).

== Etymology ==
Heimarmene's name is an ontological description of how she was seen. It is speculated to be a participial form of the Greek verb μείρεσθαι (meiresthai, meaning "to receive as one's lot"), which is derived from the same root as Moira ("fate"). It is likely that both are correct.

== Other uses ==
The term "Heimarmene" (personified or not) is also widely used in the Greek Stoic tradition, the Gnostic religion (such as in the Pistis Sophia manuscript), and other religious sects.
