= James Bruce =

Scottish traveller (1730–1794)

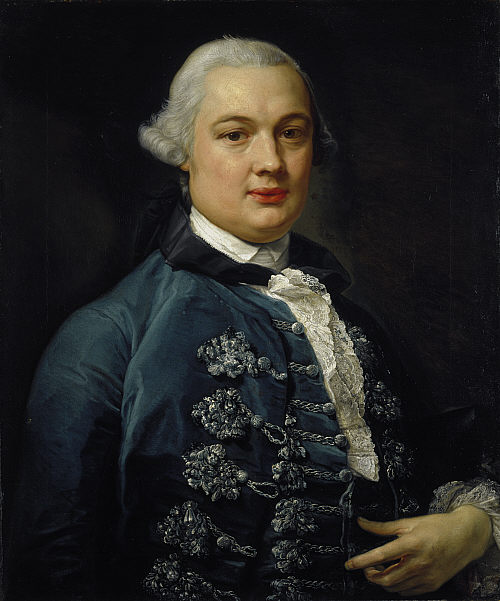
- 1762 portrait by Pompeo Batoni
- Born: 14 December 1730; Kinnaird House, Larbert, Stirlingshire, Scotland
- Died: 27 April 1794 (aged 63); Kinnaird House, Larbert, Stirlingshire, Scotland
- Occupations: Traveller; travel writer
- Known for: Traced the origins of the Blue Nile
- Notable work: Travels (1790)

James Bruce of Kinnaird (14 December 1730 – 27 April 1794) was a Scottish traveller and travel writer who physically confirmed the source of the Blue Nile. He spent more than a dozen years in North and East Africa and in 1770 became the first European to trace and document the course of the Nile by following it upstream from Egypt through Sudan to its origins in the Blue Nile in Ethiopia.

== Early life ==
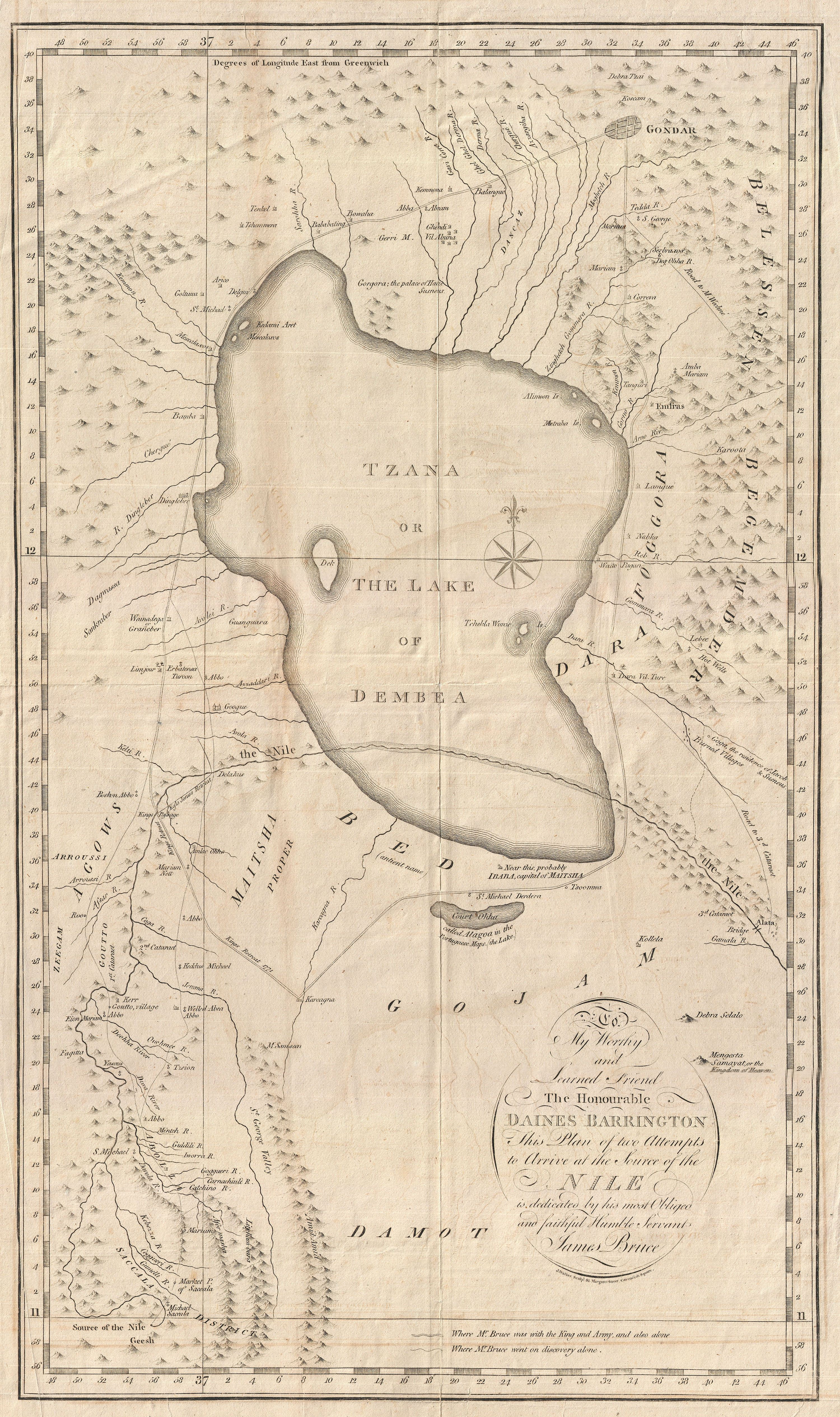
Bruce's map of the sources of the Nile

James Bruce was born at the family seat of Kinnaird, Stirlingshire, and educated at Harrow School and Edinburgh University. He began to study for the bar, but his marriage to the daughter of a wine importer and merchant resulted in him entering that business instead. His wife died in October 1754, within nine months of marriage, and Bruce thereafter travelled in Portugal and Spain as part of the wine trade. The examination of oriental manuscripts at the Escorial in Spain led him to the study of Arabic and Geʽez and determined his future career. In 1758, his father's death placed him in possession of the estate of Kinnaird.

== To North Africa ==
On the outbreak of war with Spain in 1762, he submitted to the British government a plan for an attack on Ferrol. His suggestion was not adopted, but it led to his selection by the 2nd Earl of Halifax for the post of British consul at Algiers, with a commission to study the ancient ruins in that country, in which interest had been excited by the descriptions sent home by Thomas Shaw (1694–1751), who was consular chaplain at Algiers. Having spent six months in Italy studying antiquities, Bruce reached Algiers in March 1763. The whole of his time was taken up with his consular duties at the piratical court of the dey, and he was kept without the assistance promised. But in August 1765, a successor in the consulate having arrived, Bruce began his exploration of the Roman ruins in Barbary. Having examined many ruins in eastern Algeria, he travelled by land from Tunis to Tripoli, and at Ptolemaida took passage for Candia; but was shipwrecked near Benghazi and had to swim ashore. He eventually reached Crete, and sailing thence to Sidon, travelled through Syria, visiting Palmyra and Baalbek. Throughout his journeyings in Barbary and the Levant, Bruce made careful drawings of the many ruins he examined. He also acquired a sufficient knowledge of medicine to enable him to pass in the East as a physician.

== The Nile and Ethiopia ==
In June 1768, he arrived at Alexandria, having resolved to endeavour to discover the source of the Nile, which he believed to rise in Ethiopia. At Cairo, he gained the support of the Mamluk ruler, Ali Bey. After visiting Thebes, where he entered the tomb of Ramesses III, KV11, he crossed the desert to Kosseir, where he embarked in the dress of a Turkish sailor. After an extensive navigation of the Red Sea in a local vessel, he reached Jidda in May 1769, and after a stay in Arabia he recrossed the Red Sea and landed at Massawa, then nominally in possession of the Turks, but actually controlled by the local Na'ib, on 19 September. He reached Gondar, then the capital of Ethiopia on 14 February 1770, where he was well received by the Emperor Tekle Haymanot II, Ras Mikael Sehul, the real ruler of the country, Weizero Aster, wife of the Ras (whom Bruce calls "Esther"), and all Ethiopians generally. His fine presence (he was 6-foot 4 inches high), his knowledge of Ge'ez, his excellence in sports, his courage, resource and self-esteem, all told in his favour among a people who were in general distrustful of all foreigners. He received court appointments as Gentleman of the Bedchamber and commander of the Koccob Horse, the Emperor's household cavalry. He stayed in Ethiopia for two years, gaining knowledge, copying books and collecting herbs that had special medical use, which he later presented as a gift to the French and Italian monarchs.

Determined to reach the source of the Blue Nile, after recovering from malaria, Bruce set out again in October 1770. This time he travelled with his own small party, which included Balugani and a Greek named Strates. The final march was made on 4 November 1770. Late in the afternoon, after having climbed to 9,500 feet, Bruce's party came upon a rustic church, and the guide, pointing beyond it, indicated a little swamp with a hillock rising from the centre. That, he declared, was the source of the Nile. On 14 November 1770, he reached Gish Abay, the source of the Lesser Abay. When they reached the springs at Gish, James Bruce celebrated his achievement, by picking up a half coconut shell he used as a drinking cup, filling it from the spring, then obliged Strates to drink a toast to "His Majesty King George III and a long line of princes", and another to "Catherine, Empress of all the Russians" – this last was a gesture to Strates' Greek origin, since Catherine the Great was just then at war with the Turks in the Aegean Sea. More toasts followed. Though admitting that the White Nile was the longer stream, Bruce was the first European to argue that the Blue Nile (which supplied most of its water) was the Nile of the ancients—and thus its source.

A Spaniard, the Jesuit missionary Pedro Páez, had previously reached the source of the Blue Nile by travelling from the opposite direction through the mountains of Ethiopia from the Red Sea coast in 1618. Páez had described Lake Tana as the source of the Blue Nile in his two-volume História da Ethiópia ("History of Ethiopia"). The same location had been visited and speculated about in a similar vein in 1629 by the Portuguese Jesuit missionary Jerónimo Lobo, who like Páez had arrived in Ethiopia by the Red Sea route. Bruce's journey proved this theory about the source of the Blue Nile to be fact but he disputed the historicity of Páez's visit because Lobo had failed to mention it. Bruce suggested that the relevant passage in Páez's memoirs had been fabricated by Athanasius Kircher, a Jesuit who had spread the news of Páez's discovery in Europe in 1664. Bruce also sought to discredit the writings of Lobo, joking that he seemed to be able to sail on land and denying the existence of a spitting cobra described by him. However, more recent research has shown that Lobo's description of the source was correct in its details.

== His return ==
Setting out from Gondar in December 1771, Bruce made his way, in spite of enormous difficulties, by Sennar to Nubia, being the first European to trace the Blue Nile to its confluence with the White Nile. He was detained in Al Qadarif (which he calls "Teawa") by its governor Fidele, until a combination of cunning, diplomacy and a show of force by his friend the Ethiopian governor of "Ras el Fils" (Ras Filuk) induced Fidele to release him. Once in Sennar he found himself detained there, and on the night of 25 August the house he was staying in was attacked by thieves, whom Bruce for good reason suspected to be acting with the knowledge, if not on the orders of King Ismai'l. As he and his companions crossed the desert on the eastern side of the bend of the Nile, they came across the corpses of the caravan of the Muslim dignitary Mahomet Towash they had hoped to travel with; despite his status, they had been waylaid, robbed, and killed by the local tribesmen. On 29 November 1772, he reached Aswan, presently returning to the desert to recover his journals and his baggage, which had been abandoned in consequence of the death of all his camels. In January 1773, Bruce reached Cairo. In March, he arrived in France and was welcomed by the Comte de Buffon and other savants.

He came to London in June 1774, and was interviewed by James Boswell, who published a lengthy account of his travels in the London Magazine. Offended by the incredulity with which his story was received, Bruce retired to his home at Kinnaird at age 44.

== His Travels ==
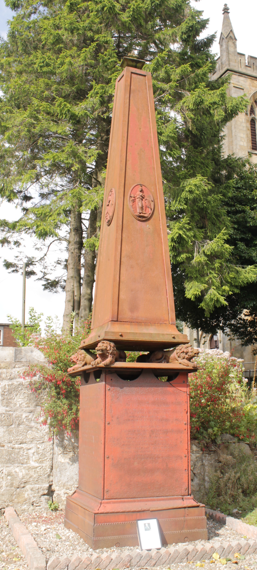
The grave of James Bruce of Kinnaird, Larbert Churchyard

In retirement, Bruce devoted himself to the management of his estate and the oversight of his collieries. In May 1776, he married Mary Dundas, the daughter of a neighbour, with whom he had three children. After his wife's early death in 1785, and at the urging of his friend Daines Barrington, he embarked on writing up his travels, which were published in five quarto volumes (totalling 3,000 pages) as Travels to Discover the Source of the Nile. The book was very successful, selling very well and being favourably reviewed in the monthly journals, but was assailed by other travellers as being unworthy of credence. The substantial accuracy of his Ethiopian travels has since been demonstrated, and it is considered that he made a real addition to the geographical knowledge of his day.

== Freemasonry ==
Bruce was a Scottish Freemason. He was Initiated in Lodge Canongate Kilwinning, No. 2, on 1 August 1753. The Lodge history, which details his Initiation in the Lodge reads: 'Bruce, James, Younger of Kinnaird – the Abyssinian Traveller.'

== Death ==
In his final years, Bruce became very corpulent. He died on 27 April 1794 of injuries sustained when on the previous day he fell down stairs at Kinnaird House. He was buried behind his wife in the Larbert old churchyard. The highly unusual monument was made out of cast iron by the local Carron Ironworks and stands on the south east corner of the churchyard.

== Legacy ==
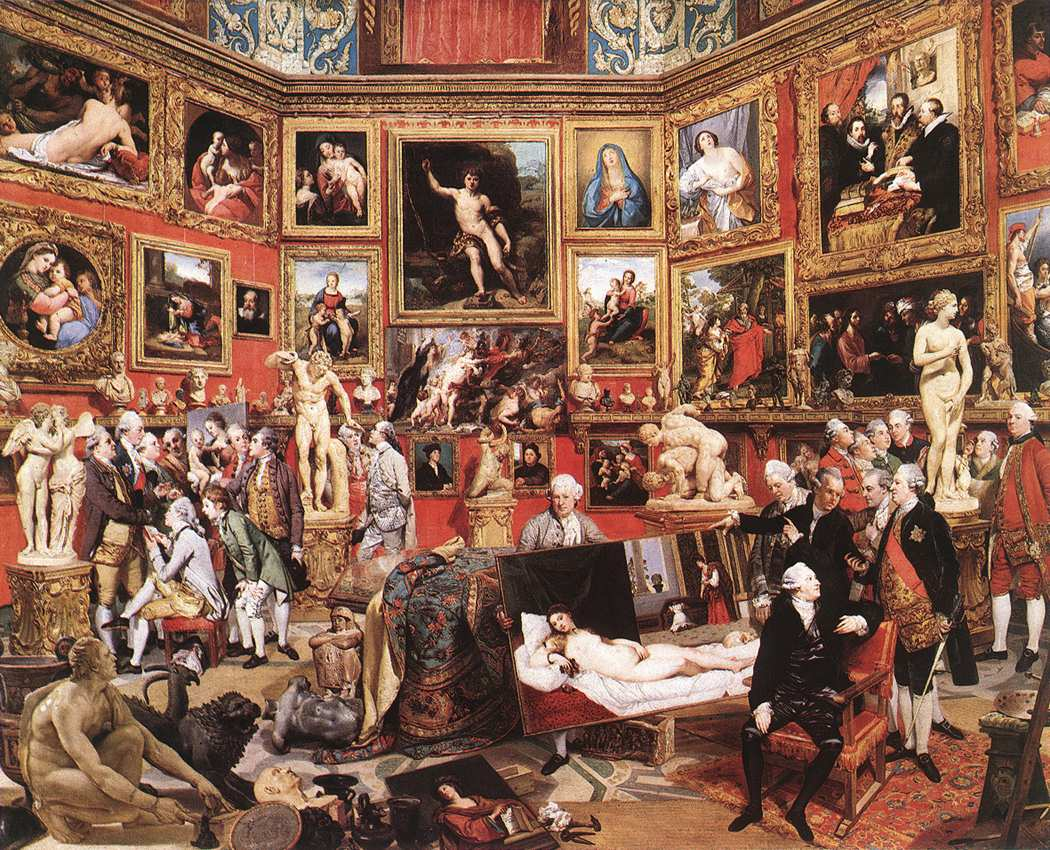
The Tribuna of the Uffizi by Johann Zoffany. Place cursor over artworks or persons to identify them.

- Bruce's Travels were published in a second edition (1804–05) and a third (1813), both edited from Bruce's papers by Alexander Murray, who also wrote a valuable contemporary biography of Bruce (1808).
- Several of Bruce's drawings were presented to King George III and are in the royal collection at Windsor Castle. According to Edward Ullendorff, "There is little doubt that those volumes contain the pick of Bruce's work, and when they were shown, in 1862, by permission of Queen Victoria, to the Society of Antiquaries, all who saw them were greatly impressed."
- Bruce also brought back to Europe a select collection of Ethiopian manuscripts. "They opened up entirely new vistas for the study of Ethiopian languages and placed this branch of Oriental scholarship on a much more secure basis," writes Ullendorff. "It is not known how many MSS. reached Europe through his endeavours, but the present writer is aware of at least twenty-seven, all of which are exquisite examples of Ethiopian manuscript art. Bruce presented a fine and specially prepared copy of the Book of Enoch to Louis XV in Paris." While most of these manuscripts are in Ge'ez, one notable exception is a version of the Song of Songs written in Gafat, a language which Ullendorff states "is known to us only from this manuscript."
- Among the Ethiopian manuscripts were three copies of the Book of Enoch. The apocryphal text had been lost in Europe since the Middle Ages, with the exception of a few quotations in the Church Fathers and some Greek fragments preserved in the work of the Byzantine chronicler George Synkellos (IX sec.) and first published by Joseph Justus Scaliger in 1606. Although it was known since the mid-16th century that the full text was preserved in Ethiopia, any attempt at acquiring the manuscript had failed. Of the three copies, Bruce presented one to King Louis XV on his arrival in Paris in 1773 for the French National Library. The second copy was given a year later to the Bodleian Library at Oxford University, while the third copy was kept by Bruce himself, to be also added to the Bodleian collections after his death in 1794. The three manuscripts brought by Bruce mark the beginning of modern studies on the Book of Enoch.
- Bruce also acquired rare Gnostic manuscripts in Coptic in the Bruce Codex, which contains the only surviving copy of the Books of Jeu.
- Bruce's travels and discoveries inspired the founders of the British African Association (1788) in their efforts to promote exploration to discover the course of the Niger and the city of Timbuktu.
- Some of Bruce's stories influenced the development of Rudolf Raspe's Surprising Adventures of Baron Munchausen.

== Editions of his book ==
- Travels to Discover the Source of the Nile, In the Years 1768, 1769, 1770, 1771, 1772 and 1773. Five Volumes, G.G.J. and J. Robinson, London, 1790.
- Travels, ed. Alexander Murray. Seven volumes, London: 1805 and 1813.
- Bruce, James, Travels. Abridged edition. Horizon Press, New York, 1964.
- Travels to discover the source of the Nile. 1 [fre]. 1790.
- Travels to discover the source of the Nile. 2 [fre]. 1790.
- Travels to discover the source of the Nile. 3 [fre]. 1790.
- Travels to discover the source of the Nile. 4 [fre]. 1791.
- Travels to discover the source of the Nile. 5 [fre]. 1791.
- Travels to discover the source of the Nile. 6 [fre]. 1791.
- Travels to discover the source of the Nile. 7 [fre]. 1791.
- Travels to discover the source of the Nile. 9 [fre]. 1791.
- Travels to discover the source of the Nile. 12 [fre]. 1791.
- Travels to discover the source of the Nile. 13 [fre]. 1792.
