= Travels to Discover the Source of the Nile =

18th-century book by James Bruce

Travels to Discover the Source of the Nile, In the Years 1768, 1769, 1770, 1771, 1772 and 1773 is a multi-volume account by the Scottish traveller James Bruce (1730–1794) of his journeys in the Horn of Africa, which includes an eye-witness account of Ethiopian history and culture, as well as a description of that country and the neighboring kingdom of Sennar and the Ottoman province of Habesh.

Bruce and his sensational stories were received with incredulity upon his return to London in 1774 after more than a dozen years of travel in North Africa and Abyssinia (Ethiopia) where he traced the Blue Nile.

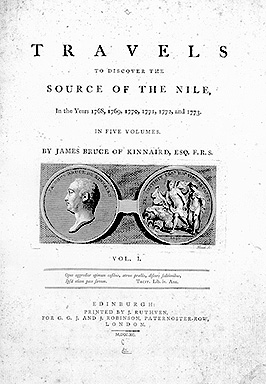
Title page Travels to Discover the Source of the Nile by James Bruce, 1790

His Travels was issued in 1790, after he retired to his home at Kinnaird, at the urging of his friend Daines Barrington. It was published in five octavo volumes, lavishly illustrated, but was ridiculed by scholars and other travellers as being exaggerated nonsense. An example of the criticism his account received would be the comments of Henry Salt, who after visiting Ethiopia and interviewing a number of inhabitants who knew him, wrote:

"The most material points (besides those noticed in a former part of this work) which affect Mr. Bruce's veracity, are those, of his never having received any district or command; his not having been engaged in the battles of Serbraxos – the overthrow of his pretensions to an almost intuitive knowledge of the languages of the country – his mis-statements respecting Guanguol, Amha Yasous, and the living feast, and the unpardonable concealment of the fact, that [the artist Luigi] Balugani attended him on his journey to the sources of the Nile."

However, the substantial accuracy of his Abyssinian travels was later confirmed by explorers who included William George Browne and E.D. Clarke, and it is considered that he made a real addition to the geographical knowledge of his day.

A new edition of the Travels was prepared by Alexander Murray in 1813, who added copious footnotes and appendices on Bruce's sources and accuracy, as well as a portion of Bruce's autobiography. Murray's most notable revision to Bruce's account was replacing his chapter on Emperor Bakaffa, removing the semi-legendary accounts of how Bakaffa met his future queen Mentewab and her important supporter Waragna with a factual drawn from the Royal Chronicles of the ruler.

Of the 19th century abridgments, the best is that of Major (afterwards Sir) Francis Head, the author of a well-informed Life of Bruce (London, 1830). Wrote Head of Bruce's descriptions:

Conscious of his own integrity, and not suspecting that, in a civilized country, the statements of a man of honour would be disbelieved, he did not think it necessary gradually and cautiously to prepare his hearers for a climate and scenery altogether different from their own, but he at once landed them in Abyssinia, and suddenly showed them a vivid picture to which he himself had been long accustomed. They had asked for novelty, and, in complying with their request, he gave them good measure, and told them of people who wore rings in their lips instead of their ears; who anointed themselves, not with bear's grease or pomatum, but with the blood of cows; who, instead of playing tunes upon them, wore the entrails of animals as ornaments; and who, instead of eating hot, putrid meat, licked their lips over bleeding, living flesh. He described debauchery dreadfully disgusting, because it was so different from their own. He told them of men who hunted each other; of mothers who had not seen ten winters; and he described crowds of human beings and huge animals retreating in terror before an army of little flies! In short, he told them the truth, the whole truth, and nothing but the truth.

— Francis Head (1840), The Life and Adventures of Bruce, the African Traveller, p. 370

== Selected editions ==
- Travels to Discover the Source of the Nile, In the Years 1768, 1769, 1770, 1771, 1772 and 1773. Five Volumes, G.G.J. and J. Robinson, London, 1790.
- Travels to Discover the Source of the Nile, In the Years 1768, 1769, 1770, 1771, 1772 and 1773, Second edition, Ed., Alexander Murray, 1805.
- Travels to Discover the Source of the Nile, In the Years 1768, 1769, 1770, 1771, 1772 and 1773, Third edition, 8 volumes; Ed., Alexander Murray; Edinburgh, 1813.
- Travels. Abridged edition, by Major Francis Head, 1830.
- Travels. Abridged edition, by C.F. Beckingham. Horizon Press, New York, 1964.
