= Pepromene =

Goddess in Greek mythology

Pepromene (Ancient Greek: Πεπρωμένη) is a goddess and being of fate/destiny in Greek mythology (a being of "the destined share", which implies a person's true calling and fate; in short, the idea that every man is tied to a destiny). The ancient perception of her being gives the name as belonging within other Greek ideas (or "seeings") for destiny and fate (such as Aesa, Moira, Moros, Ananke, Adrasteia and Heimarmene).

== Etymology ==
Pepromene's name is speculated to have numerous different origins; some postulate it is derived from the Greek πεπρῶσθαι, peprosthai, meaning "to be furnished, fulfilled or fated". However, others suggest that the same πεπερατοσθαι (pepratosthai) means "finite", implying finite nature; the fact that nothing in this life lasts forever.

== Sources ==
- Smith, Dictionary of Greek and Roman Biography and Mythology, v. 3, page 184
- Greek and Roman Religion: a source book
- http://bearsite.info/General/World_Literature/greek/plutarch/essays.txt (The Complete Works Volume 3, Essays and Miscellanies, by Plutarch)
