= Bruce Codex =

Codex containing Gnostic works

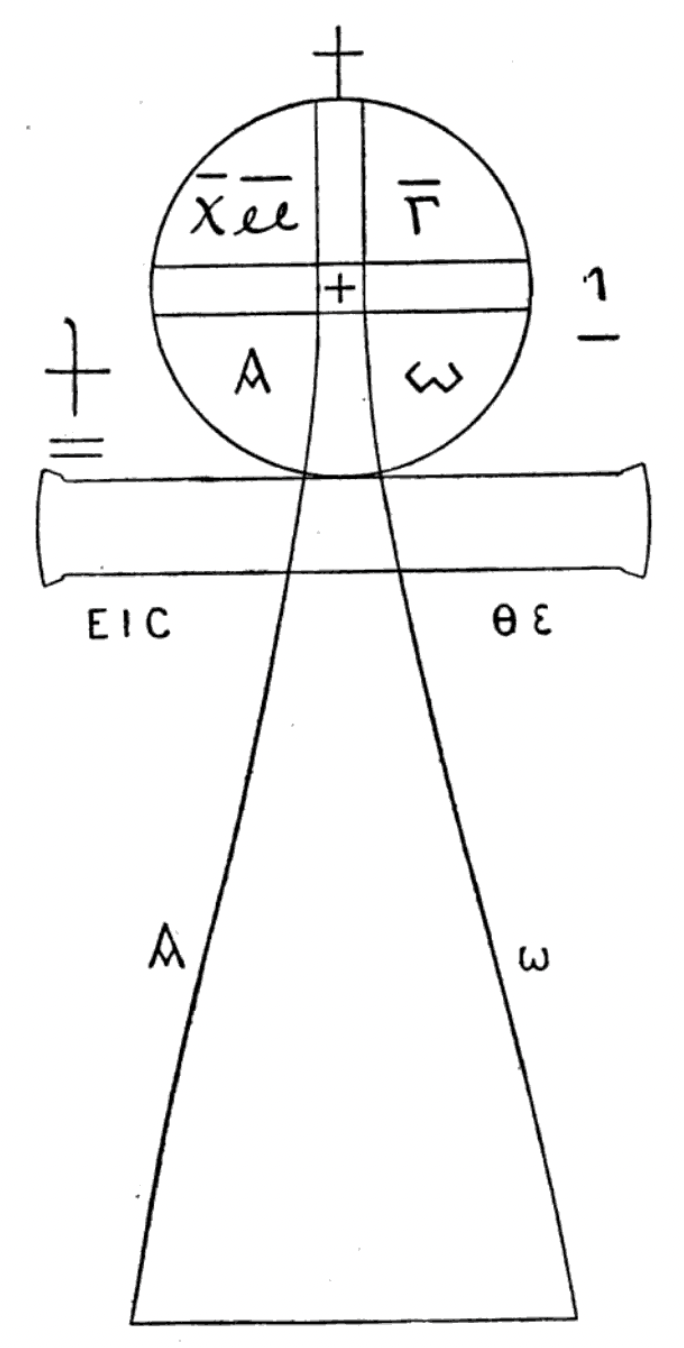
A reconstruction of an illustration in the Bruce Codex of a Gnostic cross that may have been intended as a frontispiece.

The Bruce Codex (Latin: Codex Brucianus) is a Coptic codex that contains rare Gnostic works; the Bruce Codex is the only known surviving copy of the Books of Jeu and another work simply called Untitled Text or the Untitled Apocalypse. In 1769, James Bruce purchased the codex in Upper Egypt. It is currently kept in the Bodleian Library in Oxford (Bruce 96), where it has been since 1848.

== History ==
The Scottish traveler James Bruce purchased the codex around 1769 while in Upper Egypt, near Medinet Habu. It had supposedly been found in the ruins of a building once inhabited by Egyptian monks. The codex came to the attention of Carl Gottfried Woide, who made a copy of the Coptic Gnostic texts within, as well as discussed the codex in a work on Egyptian copies of the Bible and other religious manuscripts. In 1848, both Woide's transcript of the text as well as the original codex were acquired by the Bodleian Library and classified as "Bruce 96". Möritz Gotthilf Schwartze took the next look at comparing the versions, but died in 1848 with his work unfinished. Coptologist Émile Amélineau began work on the text in 1882 and published a translation into French in 1891. At the recommendations of Adolf Erman and Adolf von Harnack, the German Coptologist Carl Schmidt was sent to Oxford to examine the codex. Building on Woide and Schwartze's work (and largely ignoring Amélineau's), Schmidt made a new edition, as well as proposed an ordering of the pages. He also associated the work with the "Books of Jeu" mentioned in the Pistis Sophia, another Gnostic work; the manuscript does not self-identify itself as the Books of Jeu, but instead titles itself "The Book of the Great Logos Corresponding to Mysteries." Schmidt's critical edition of the Books of Jeu was published in 1892, with both the original Coptic and his translation into German; he slightly updated his translation in a 1905 book that contained related Gnostic writings from other codices, such as the Pistis Sophia. In 1918, F. Lamplugh published The Gnosis of the Light, a translation of The Untitled Apocalypse into English largely based on Amélineau's French translation. Charlotte A. Baynes published a different English translation in 1933 based directly on Coptic, skipping an intervening step through French or German; she also differed from Schmidt's proposed ordering of the pages of the codex, and placed Schmidt's final five leaves at the beginning instead. Violet MacDermot published a new translation of both the Books of Jeu and the Untitled Text into English in 1978.

== Contents ==
The Bruce Codex, when it was purchased by Bruce, consisted of 78 loose unordered papyrus leaves. Each leaf was inscribed on both sides for 156 pages total. By the time the Bodleian acquired the Codex, 7 of the original leaves had gone missing, however. Knowledge of them is kept by the copies Woide made when all of the leaves were still there. The Bodleian bound the loose leaves together in 1886, but haphazardly and by someone who did not speak Coptic: pages were in a random order and sometimes upside-down. The Bodleian would later re-bind the text in Schmidt's suggested page order in 1928.

The Books of Jeu consist of 47 leaves, of which 3 are missing, and is written in a cursive style. The Untitled Apocalypse consists of 31 leaves, of which 4 are missing, and is written in an uncial style. Schmidt associated two small fragments (a hymn and a prose passage on the progress of a soul through the "Archons of the Midst") with the second Book of Jeu, which is incomplete, although hypothetically they could have been fragments of an unknown and lost third text. The Untitled Apocalypse is also incomplete, lacking both a beginning and an end.

Due to lack of modern knowledge and care on proper preservation of papyrus, the condition of the manuscript, already poor to begin with (considering a number of transcription errors Woide made), deteriorated further over the course of the 19th century. It is currently in "very poor" state, with dark spots covering text from mildew due to being in a more humid environment than optimal for too long; the reason the codex had survived as long as it did, when so much other literature of the period was lost, was due to Egypt's dry climate. The writing is so faded as to be almost illegible. As such, the photographs made when the codex was in better condition are a key resource in interpreting the manuscript itself.

== See also ==
- Setheus
