= Askew Codex =

Manuscript

The Askew Codex (a.k.a. Codex Askewianus) is a manuscript of parchment in quarto size, or 21 x 16,5 cm, held by the British Library (BL Additional MS 5114), that contains Coptic translations of a Gnostic text that is commonly referred to as Pistis Sophia, though Carl Schmidt suggests Τεύχη τοῦ Σωτῆρος "Books of the Saviour", based on a title found at the end of the same book.

The codex was originally purchased by Anthony Askew, a London doctor and collector of old manuscripts, from a bookseller in 1772. The codex was purchased from the heirs of Askew by the British Museum (now the British Library) in 1785. Its origin is most probably Egypt, but it is not known where it was found or how it ended up in England. The codex contains 178 leaves or 356 pages, and is in excellent condition, with the exception of two leaves (pp. 337–344), which are missing. The complete manuscript was written by two different hands. Both hands used different inks, different page numberings and a different way to mark corrections. Both writers seem to be of the same period.

Until the discovery of the Nag Hammadi library in 1945, the Askew Codex was one of three surviving codices containing full copies of all of the gnostic writings that have survived until recent times; the other two are the Bruce Codex and the Berlin Codex.

== Editions ==
- Moritz Gotthilf Schwartze; Pistis Sophia, opus gnosticum Valentino adiudicatum e codice manuscripto Coptico Londinensi, descripsit et latine vertit M. G. Schwartze, edidit J. H. Petermann, Berolini, 1851. First edition of the Coptic Text with a translation into Latin. The work of Schwartze was published postum by Petermann.
- Carl Schmidt; Koptisch-gnostische Schriften. Bd. I. Die Pistis Sophia. Die beiden Bücher des Jeû. Unbekanntes altgnostisches Werk (Leipzig), 1905.. First German translation, with numerous corrections of the edition of Schwartze.
- Pistis Sophia; A Gnostic Miscellany: Being for the most part extracts from the Books of the saviour, to which are added excerpts from a cognate literature; Englished by G. R. S. Mead. London: J. M. Watkins [1921]. English translation with an introduction and description of the manuscript.
