= Carl Schmidt (Coptologist) =

German Coptologist (1868-1938)

Carl Schmidt (26 August 1868, in Hagenow, Grand Duchy of Mecklenburg-Schwerin – 17 April 1938, in Cairo) was a German Coptologist. He made editions of various Coptic texts, and was active in Egypt in purchasing papyri for German universities. He also assisted Sir Chester Beatty in his papyri purchases.

In 1887 Carl Schmidt studied classical philology, Hebrew and comparative linguistics in Leipzig. After just one year he moved to the University of Berlin. Adolf Harnack introduced him to patristics and to the history of old Christian literature. The Egyptologists Adolf Erman and Georg Steindorff also had an impact. Steindorff taught him the Coptic language. His doctorate was on Codex Brucianus. Harnack recognised the special abilities of Schmidt and supported his pupil as much as he could, however Schmidt's career was uncertain for a long time. In 1899 he attained the habilitation in history of Christianity with "Plotins Stellung zum Gnostizismus und kirchlichen Christentum".

With the support of Harnack in 1900 he became "wissenschaftlicher Beamter der Kirchenväterkommission", a position, which secured his income. Harnack himself was part of the Kirchenväterkommission. The Kirchenväterkommission entrusted Schmidt with the publishing of the Codex Brucianus and the Pistis Sophia (Codex Askewianus). For the publishing of the meanwhile mutilated and partly destroyed Codex Brucianus, Schmidt was able to use the copies and notes of Karl Gottfried Woide and Moritz Gotthilf Schwartze, which were made, when the manuscript still was in better condition. He published the Acts of Peter and the Acts of Paul. In 1909, he became an Extraordinary Professor, in 1921 he was made Honorary Professor and in 1928 he was appointed as an Ordinary Professor of History of Christianity and for Coptic Language and Literature. Together with Harnack he was editor of Texte und Untersuchungen zur Geschichte der altchristlichen Literatur. Carl Schmidt was also occupied with Manichaean manuscripts and played an important role in purchasing Coptic manuscripts for the Berlin Papyrus Collection. Schmidt was a member of the Deutsche Morgenländische Gesellschaft and of the Gesellschaft für Kirchengeschichte. He died in 1938 in Cairo.

== Important works ==
- De codice Bruciano seu de libris gnosticis qui in lingua coptice exstant commentatio. Pars I A qua haeresi et quo tempre »Pistis Sophia« et »Duo libri de Jeû« sint conscripti. Leipzig 1892. (Latin)
- Gnostische Schriften in koptischer Sprache aus dem Codex Brucianus herausgegeben, übersetzt und bearbeitet von Carl Schmidt. Hinrichs´sche Buchhandlung, Leipzig 1892.
- Koptisch-gnostische Schriften. Band 1: Pistis Sophia, die beiden Bücher des Jeû, unbekanntes altgnostisches Werk, Hrsg. im Auftrage der Kirchenväter-Commission der Königl. preussischen Akademie der Wissenschaften. Hinrichs, Leipzig 1905. In: Die griechischen christlichen Schriftsteller der ersten drei Jahrhunderte; Koptisch-Gnostische Schriften. Band 1.
- Acta Pauli aus der Heidelberger koptischen Papyrushandschrift Nr. 1. Herausgegeben von Carl Schmidt, Übersetzungen, Untersuchungen und Koptischer Text, Hinrichs, Leipzig 1904.
- Acta Pauli. Übersetzung Untersuchungen und koptischer Text, zweite erweiterte Ausgabe ohne Tafeln, Hinrichs, Leipzig 1905.
- Der erste Clemensbrief in altkoptischer Übersetzung untersucht und herausgegeben von Carl Schmidt. Mit Lichtdruckfaksimile der Handschrift, Hinrichs, Leipzig 1908.
- Die alten Petrusakten. im Zusammenhang der apokryphen Apostellitteratur nebst einem neuentdeckten Fragment, untersucht von Carl Schmidt, Hinrichs, Leipzig 1903. In: Texte und Untersuchungen zur Geschichte der altchristlichen Literatur. herausgegeben von Oskar von Gebhardt und Adolf Harnack, Neue Folge Neunter Band, der ganzen Reihe XXIV Band. This translation refers to the papyrus manuscript P 8502 in the Berliner Papyrussammlung.
- Altchristliche Texte. bearbeitet von C. Schmidt und W. Schubart. Mit zwei Lichtdrucktafeln, Weidmannsche Buchhandlung in Berlin 1910. In: Berliner Klassikertexte herausgegeben von der Generalverwaltung der kgl. Museen zu Berlin, Heft VI Altchristliche Texte. Contains: Ignatius, Epistula ad Smyrnacos III-XII, 1.; Der Hirt des Hermas; Anthologie aus den Briefen des Basileios; Anthologie aus der Vita Mosis des Gregor von Nyssa; Osterfestbrief des Alexander, Patriarch von Alexandrien; Liturgische Stücke; Amulette.
- Gespräche Jesu mit seinen Jüngern nach der Auferstehung ein katholisch-apostolisches Sendschreiben des 2. Jahrhunderts nach einem koptischen Papyrus des Institut de la Mission archéol. française au Caire unter Mitarbeit von Herrn Pierre Lacau ... herausgegeben, übersetzt und untersucht, nebst drei Exkursen von Carl Schmidt. Übersetzung des äthiopischen Textes von Dr. Isaak Wajnberg, Hinrichs, Leipzig 1919.
- Neue Originalquellen des Manichäismus aus Ägypten, Vortrag gehalten auf der Jahreshauptversammlung der Gesellschaft für Kirchengeschichte in Berlin am 9. November 1932. Kohlhammer, Stuttgart 1933.
- Ein Mani-Fund in Ägypten: Originalschriften des Mani und seiner Schüler / von Carl Schmidt und Hans Jakob Polotsky. In: Sitzungsberichte der Preussischen Akademie der Wissenschaften : Phil.-Hist. Klasse; 1933,1. Verlag der Akadademie der Wissenschaften, Berlin 1933.
- Manichäische Handschriften der Staatlichen Museen zu Berlin. Kephalaia. Bd. 1. Hälfte 1. hrsg. unter der Leitung von Carl Schmidt, Stuttgart 1940.

== Literature ==
- Stefan Rebenich: Theodor Mommsen und Adolf Harnack. Wissenschaft und Politik im Berlin des ausgehenden 19. Jahrhunderts. Berlin 1997
- Christoph Markschies: Carl Schmidt und kein Ende. Aus großer Zeit der Koptologie an der Berliner Akademie und der Theologischen Fakultät der Universität. In: Zeitschrift für Antikes Christentum 13, 2009, pp. 5–28.
- Stefan Rebenich: "Da steht mir der Verstand still" (PDF; 360 kB), Adolf Harnack und Ulrich von Wilamowitz-Moellendorff über die Schmidt-Spiegelberg-Kontroverse. In: M. Mülke (Hrsg.), Wilamowitz und kein Ende, Hildesheim 2003, pp. 189–207.
- Peter Nagel (2007). "Carl Schmidt". Neue Deutsche Biographie (in German). Vol. 23. Berlin: Duncker & Humblot. pp. 200–201. (full text online).
