= Dean Askew =

New Zealand cricketer (born 1962)

Personal information
- Full name: Dean Newman Askew
- Born: 15 June 1962 (age 64); Hamilton, New Zealand
- Batting: Right-handed
- Bowling: Right-arm fast-medium

Domestic team information
- Years: Team
- 1982/83: Poverty Bay
- 1991/92–1994/95: Central Districts
- 1992/93–1994/95: Hawke's Bay
- 1997/98: Auckland

Dean Newman Askew (born 15 June 1962) is a former New Zealand cricketer who played first-class cricket for Central Districts, and Auckland and also first-class rugby for King County. He subsequently played several cricket seasons in the Netherlands and the UK.

In February 2020, he was named in New Zealand's squad for the over-50s Cricket World Cup in South Africa. However, the tournament was cancelled during the third round of matches due to the coronavirus pandemic.

Askew has also toured India with the New Zealand Over 60s side.
