= Janet Askew =

Janet Margaret Askew (died 10 May 2015) was a New Zealand nurse. In her work for the International Red Cross and Red Crescent Movement she worked in areas of armed conflict and natural disaster.

== Biography ==
Askew grew up in Wairoa in the North Island of New Zealand. After her initial nursing training she worked in a public health unit and decided in 2002 to join the Red Cross as a health aid worker. Her first mission was in 2003, to Sudan. She also served in Indonesia, Cambodia, Lebanon and Iraq. In 2007 and 2008, Askew worked in Darfur, Sudan, administering vaccinations in rural areas. She was the victim of three armed hold-ups during this time and returned to New Zealand on a year's leave to recover from the traumatic stress she experienced.

In 2013 the International Committee of the Red Cross awarded Askew the Florence Nightingale Medal. Later the same year Askew retired from active nursing as she had been diagnosed with cancer.

Askew died in May 2015.
