= HMS Shamrock =

Three ships of the Royal Navy have been named Shamrock, after the plant:

- HMS Shamrock (1808), a schooner built at Bermuda in 1808 and wrecked in 1811. She was the name-ship of her class of 10-gun schooners.
- HMS Shamrock (1812), an unrated brig-sloop transferred to HM Revenue Service in 1833 and sold in 1867.
- HMS Shamrock (1918), an S-class destroyer built in Sunderland, launched 1918 and scrapped in 1936.
