= Tosh Askew =

English rugby union coach

Barry Askew, known by most as Tosh, was coach of the England under 19's rugby union team. He lives in Stoke-on-Trent.

He led the England Under-19 team to a Grand Slam in 2005 and also guided the team to the semi-finals of the 2005 Under-19 Rugby World Championship.

He was previously a rugby coach and part-time English teacher at a Newcastle-under-Lyme School. During the 1980s Tosh was at St Mary's College Crosby, Merseyide where he was Games Master. During this period he played his rugby for Liverpool St. Helens at full back.

Tosh Ashkew is once again with Newcastle-under-Lyme School working as a part-time coach. He also coaches youth players in the Stoke-on-Trent area, including those at Eccleshall R.F.C.
