= Valerie Askew =

British modelling agent (1939–2020)

Valerie Askew (25 January 1939 – 27 August 2020) was a British modelling agent and the co-founder (with her younger sister, Gloria) of the Askew Team modelling agency in 1966.

== Early life ==
She was born in Epping, London on 25 January 1939, the daughter of William Askew, an opera singer turned music and drama teacher and Irene (née Molyneaux), a poet.

== Career ==
In 1966, together with her younger sister Gloria, she founded the Askew Team modelling agency at 22 Bruton Street, Mayfair, London. In 1973, they were the first London agency to open a branch in Milan.

Their models included Sue Nadkarni, Ika Hindley, Catherine Dyer, Lorraine Chase, Michael Edwards, Sadie Frost, and Naomi Campbell.

== Personal life ==
In 1960, she married Joe Joseph, an RAF engineer. They had five children. They divorced in 1978. She died of heart failure on 27 August 2020.
