= Books of Jeu =

Two 3rd-century Christian texts

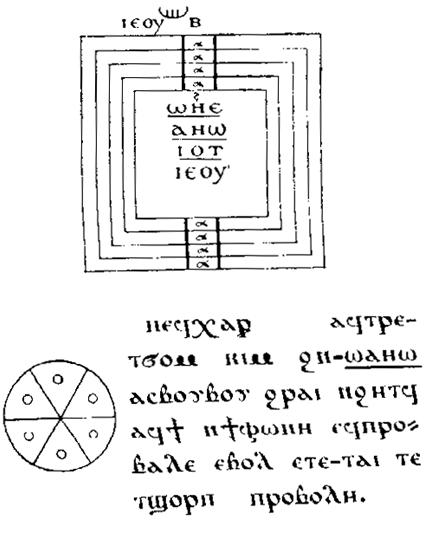
A page from the 1st book of Jeu

The Books of Jeu are two Gnostic texts. Though independent works, both the First Book of Jeu and the Second Book of Jeu appear, in Sahidic Coptic, in the Bruce Codex. They are a combination of a gospel and an esoteric revelation; the work professes to record conversations Jesus had with both the male apostles and his female disciples, and the secret knowledge (gnosis) revealed in these conversations.

== Authorship and date ==
The date of the Bruce Codex, which contains the sole surviving copy of the work, is unknown and disputed, with estimates ranging from the 3rd to the 10th century. It is believed that the Sahidic Coptic of the Codex version is a translation, however, and the original was written in Koine Greek in the early 3rd century. This estimate is because the Pistis Sophia mentions the two books of Jeu twice (158.18 and 228.35), suggesting that the Books of Jeu were written before it, and the Pistis Sophia is dated to the late 3rd or early 4th century.

The author is unknown, but was presumably a Gnostic Christian in Roman Egypt.

== Content ==
The work frequently refers to Jesus as "the living [one]" or "the life-giving", in reference to the resurrection. There are standard references to Gnostic theology: the disciples ask Jesus to "teach us the hidden knowledge". According to Jesus, the Father projected "Jeu" (Ίεου) from his bosom, and then 28 emanations formed over the Aeons, with each form, mystic name, and number spelled out with great precision. Jesus gives the "three baptisms" to those present of water, fire, and the Holy Spirit, and explains the Gnostic mystery that will save them from the Archons. Jesus says that after the disciples' souls were purified and saved, they will eventually transmit themselves through the Aeons to a transcendent realm in the place of the great invisible God, the great virginal Spirit, and 24 emanations of God. The work then discusses the secret names of the aeons, their numbers, their seals, their passwords, formula which allow free passage through the celestial spheres, and other esoteric details. Jesus closes with a warning to only share such information with those worthy to receive the true knowledge. Much of the work is illustrated with detailed diagrams, rather than being solely text.

One of the unusual features of the Books of Jeu are that they predominantly consist of mystic incantations and similarly esoteric diagrams, often including concentric circles and squares. The text was perhaps used as a sort of prayer book or spell book for Gnostic rituals. The text also includes Gnostic hymns of praise.

== Analysis ==
The work is somewhat similar to the Gnostic Apocryphon of John.

M. R. James was unimpressed with the work; he wrote that its "mystic diagrams, and numbers, and meaningless collections of letters (...) require a vast deal of historical imagination and sympathy to put oneself in the place of anybody who could tolerate, let alone reverence, the dreary stuff."

== See also ==
- Grimoire
