= Anthony Askew =

English physician and book collector (1722–1774)

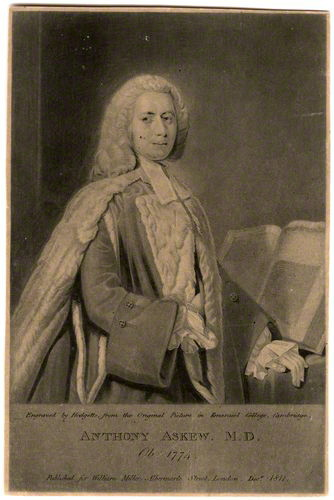
Portrait of Anthony Askew, M.D., by Thomas Hodgetts (active 1801–1846), National Portrait Gallery.

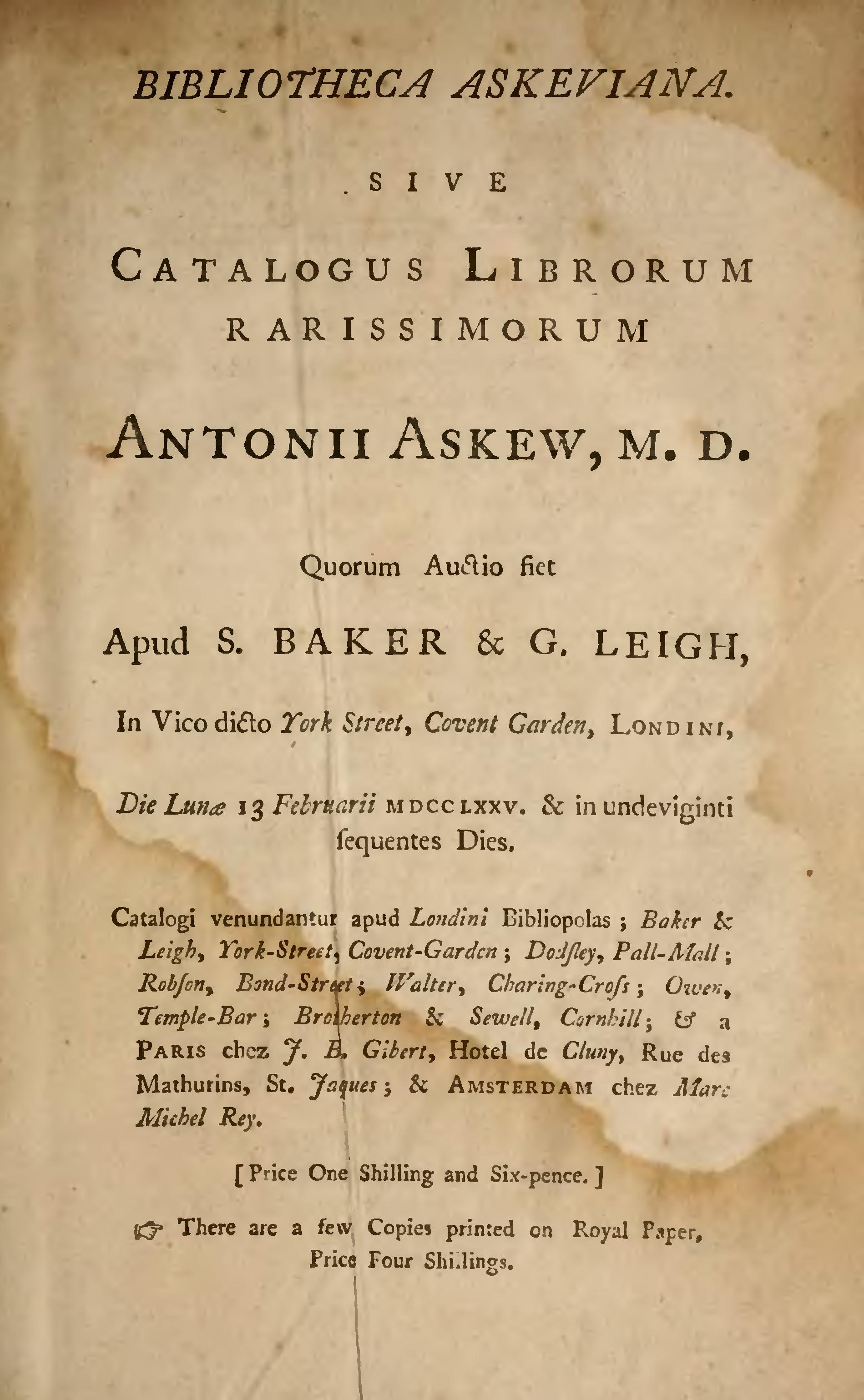
Image of Biblioteca Askeviana, 1775, Dr. Anthony Askew

Anthony Askew (1722–1774) was an English physician and is best known for having been a book collector. His collection was purchased by the British Museum and books purchased by George III of Great Britain were added to the King's Library.

== Life and work ==
Askew was born in 1722 in Kendal, Westmorland, the son of Dr. Adam Askew, a well-known physician of Newcastle (Note: In 1748, his father purchased a historic manor near Gateshead called Redheaugh Hall.) and Ann Crackenthorp. (Note: Her father was Richard Crackenthorp, Esquire of Newbiggin, County Westmorland. Ann was co-heiress to his estate.) He was baptised in Kendal on 7 May 1722. The family moved to Newcastle in 1725.

His early education was at Sedbergh School and The Royal Free Grammar School in Newcastle upon Tyne. According to a fellow physician, he was terrified of the formidable Head Master, Richard Dawes. (Note: In those days the birch was allowed, and the father of Anthony is said to have stipulated with Dawes that his son should be only liable to strictly limited castigation.)

He was married twice. He first married Margaret Swinburn; they had no children. (Note: Margaret was the daughter of Cuthbert Swinburn, Esquire of Long Witton and the Westgate in Northumberland.) The second time to Elizabeth Holford, by whom he had twelve children, six girls and six boys. (Note: Elizabeth was the daughter of Robert Holford, Esquire, a master in chancery.) Elizabeth was born in 1734 and died on 2 August 1773.

== Medical education and career ==
He took the degree of Bachelor of Medicine, Bachelor of Surgery (M.B.) at Emmanuel College, Cambridge in December 1745.

Initially intended for the medical profession, Askew studied for one year at Leiden University in Holland. He then travelled to Hungary, Athens, Constantinople, Italy, and other countries. He began to collect valuable books and manuscripts he laid the foundation of the extensive library, the Bibliotheca Askeviana.

He started medical practice at Cambridge in 1750, in which year he took his degree of Doctor of Medicine (M.D.), and afterwards established himself in London. He was physician to St. Bartholomew's and Christ's Hospital, and Registrar of the College of Physicians from 1767 until 1774.

On 8 February 1749 he became a member of the Royal Society. On 25 June 1752 he became a candidate of the Royal College of Physicians and one year later became a fellow of the organisation. In 1758 he delivered the Harveian Oration at the Royal College of Physicians.

== Book collector ==
Askew is best known today as a classical scholar and bibliophile. Aeschylus was his favourite author. He assembled an extensive library, (Note: In 1832 it was said that Askew had owned the best private collection of Latin and Greek manuscripts and books sold in England.) the Bibliotheca Askeviana, helping to develop the taste for curious manuscripts, scarce editions, and fine copies. Askew's house was crowded with books from the cellar up to the garrets. The collection was chiefly classical, and it was its possessor's aim to have every edition of every Greek author. (Note: According to Seymour de Ricci, Askew purchased Maffei family classical codices, Greek manuscripts from R. Mead and Dr. Taylor's papers in an attempt to purchase all of the published Greek classics.)

In Thornton's Medical Books, Libraries and Collectors, Alain Besson wrote that Askew's library was full of "rare manuscripts and choice editions in exquisite bindings", and that Askew made "bibliomania fashionable".

== Death ==
Askew died 28 February 1774 at Hampstead, London, England. (Note: The Dictionary of National Biographies (1904) stated that Askew died 27 February 1772. His gravestone, however, states that he died 28 February 1774. Myers Literary Guide and Jeremy Norman's HistoryofScience.com both show Askew's year of death as 1774, with no date or month of death.)

He was buried at Hampstead church. Henry Askew, Anthony's brother, became the caregiver for the orphaned children.

After the death of Askew, the library of nearly 7,000 books, was sold at an auction which lasted from 13 February to 7 March 1775. William Munk stated that the library collection was sold beginning 19 February 1775 by Baker and Leigh; the sale continued for 19 days. The catalogue of the collection was sold at one shilling and sixpence, with a few copies on royal paper at four shillings... Over 80% of the sale consisted of classical texts in Latin and Greek. The purchasers of Askew's books at the auction included the anatomist William Hunter, the British Museum and the kings of England and France. Books purchased by George III of England in 1762, and the Second Folio of Shakespeare bought in 1800, were added to the King's Library.

Askew's extensive collection of transcribed inscriptions is at the British Museum. One codex of his collection is named Askew Codex.
