= Egeon Askew =

English divine

Egeon Acton Askew (born 1576), was an English divine.

== Early life ==
Askew was from Lancashire. His family was originally of Mulcaster Crescent, Carlisle, Cumberland, and subsequently of Kirkby Ireleth, in North Lancashire, at which latter place one Thomas Askew, M.A., was instituted vicar in 1606. At the age of seventeen Egeon Askew became a student of the University of Oxford; he was B.A. April 1597, chaplain of Queen's College 1598, and M.A. June 1600.

== Career ==
About the time of the accession of James I, having the reputation of a noted preacher, he was minister of Greenwich, Kent. He was the author of one book only, which was entered by George Bishop on the registers of Stationers' Hall 27 March 1605, said to be by Egeon Acton Askew, of Queen's College. This work is made up of college sermons. When Dr. Bliss edited Wood, there was no copy in the Bodleian Library; and the copy which Wood saw is wrongly described, being made into two books, after his manner.

== Brotherly Reconcilement ==
Brotherly Reconcilement was the title of his work. He preached in Oxford for the union of some, and now published with larger meditations for the unity of all in this church and common-wealth. With an apology of the use of the Fathers and secular learning in sermons.' Lond. 4to, 1605. The dedication to King James is dated from Greenwich, 27 April that year.

The book shows traces of very wide reading, the margins being filled with references to ancient authorities. Hence Wood described him as 'a person as well read in the fathers, commentators, and schoolmen, as any man of his age in the university.' The second portion of the book is in strict keeping with the style of composition in which he indulged; it is a discussion 'whether Humanitie, i.e. anything beside the words of scripture, be lawful quoad esse or quoad gradum at all, as some deny, or only against adversaries, as some hold, in sermons academical or popular.' It is not known when or where Askew died. Evelyn assured Wood that he did not die at Greenwich.
