= Edward Ayscu =

English historian

Edward Ayscu, Ayscough or Askew (1550–1616/17), was an English historian.

Ayscu was educated at Christ's College, Cambridge, where he graduated B.A. in 1586-1587. He afterward resided at Cotham, in Lincolnshire, from which place he dates the preface to his only work, A Historie contayning the Warres, Treaties, Marriages, and other occurrents betweene England and Scotland, from King William the Conqueror until the happy Union of them both in our gratious King James. With a briefe declaration of the first Inhabitants of this Island: And what severall Nations have sithence settled them-selves therein one after an other, London, 1607, 4to.

Ayscu has sometimes been confused with his cousin Sir Edward Ayscu (1596–1654?) of South Kelsey.
