= Henry Askew =

Lieutenant-General Sir Henry Askew KCB
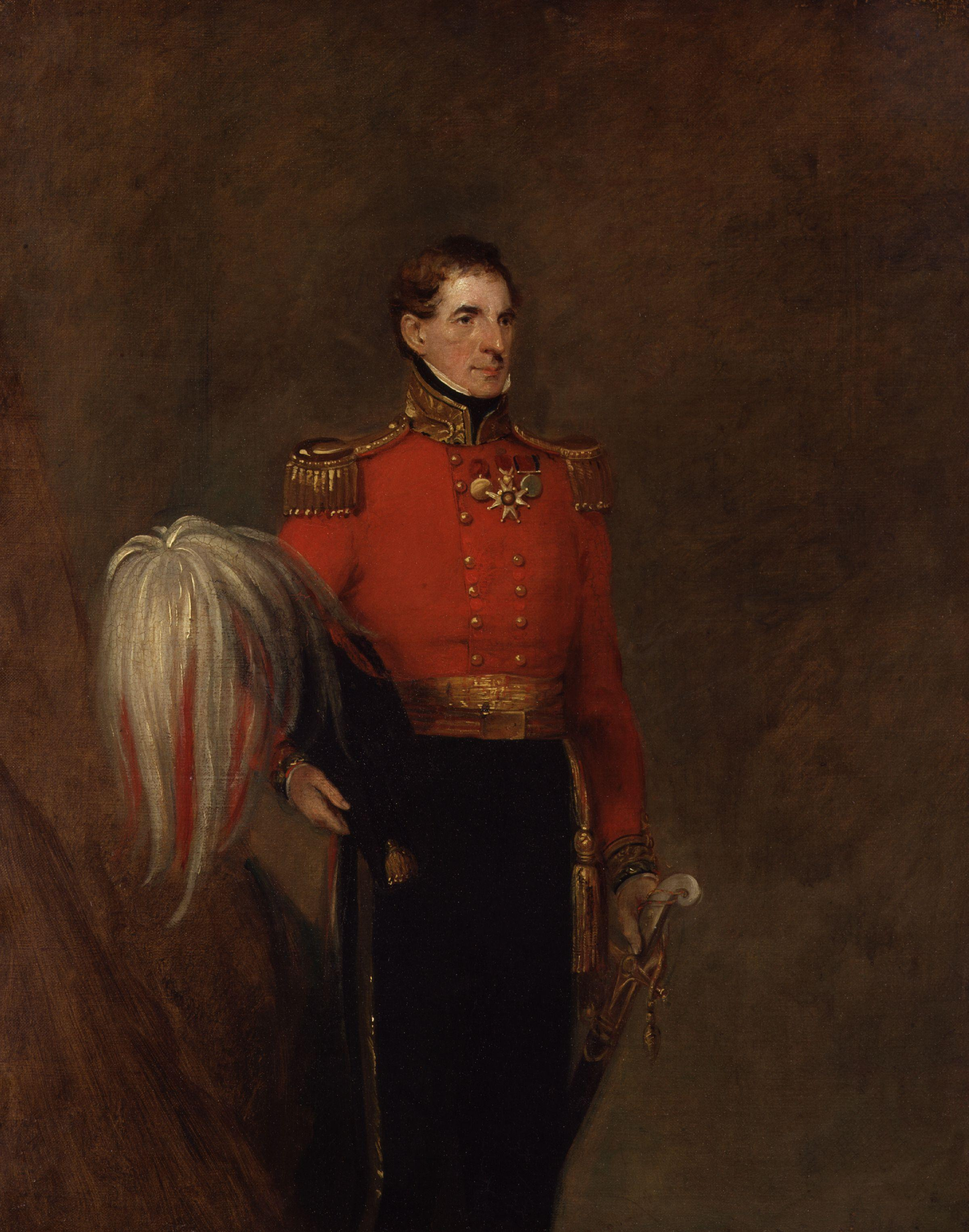
- Born: 7 May 1775
- Died: 25 June 1847 (aged 72)
- Military career
- Allegiance: United Kingdom of Great Britain and Ireland
- Branch: British Army
- Service years: 1793–1847
- Rank: Lieutenant-General
- Unit: 1st Regiment of Foot
- Conflicts: French Revolutionary Wars; Anglo-Russian invasion of Holland; Napoleonic Wars; Walcheren Campaign; Peninsular War; Battle of the Nive; Battle of Quatre Bras
- Awards: Waterloo Medal; Knight Bachelor

Sir Henry Askew KCB (7 May 1775 – 25 June 1847) was an officer of the British Army. He served during the Napoleonic Wars and fought at the Battle of Waterloo. He rose to the rank of lieutenant-general during his career.

== Biography ==
Askew was born in 1775, the third son of John Askew of Pallinsburn House, Ford, Northumberland.

He joined the army in 1793 as an ensign in the 1st Foot. He served in the campaigns in Holland and Flanders in 1799, and then in the Walcheren Campaign in 1809. Askew took part in the Peninsular War and operations in the south of France, being commended with a medal for his part in the Battle of the Nive.

He was wounded at the Battle of Quatre Bras and received the Waterloo Medal. He was knighted in 1821 and became a lieutenant-general in 1837.

Askew died in 1847.
