= Carl Gottfried Woide =

Carl Gottfried Woide FRS
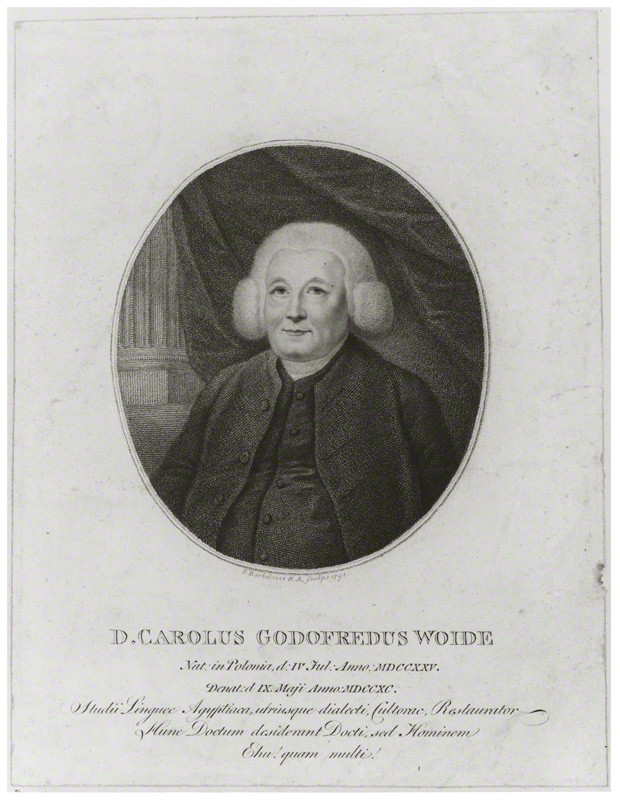
- Born: July 4, 1725; Leszno, Polish–Lithuanian Commonwealth
- Died: May 9, 1790; British Museum, London
- Other name: Charles Godfrey Woide
- Occupations: pastor and scholar

Carl Gottfried Woide (German: Karl Gottfried Woide, Polish: Karol Gotfryd Woide; 4 July 1725 – 9 May 1790), also known in England as Charles Godfrey Woide, was an Orientalist, a biblical scholar, political envoy, and a pastor. He was born into a patrician family of Leszno (Lissa) belonging to the Unity of the Brethren, whose principal Polish congregation there had by then merged with the Reformed church.

== Early life and education ==
Woide's grandfather, Peter Woide, was a jurist, royal Polish secretary, town councillor and church elder in Leszno. His father, Martin Gottlieb Woide, was the town's postmaster and a councillor. As an elder of the Reformed congregation, he represented it in its disputes with the Lutheran Kreuzkirche and went to Berlin on its behalf to see the court preacher Daniel Ernst Jablonski.

Woide attended the Gymnasium in Leszno. From 1734 he held a scholarship from the congregation's Schoenaich Foundation, which in 1745 awarded him one of its larger academic grants. Following the custom of the Unity, he studied at the University of Frankfurt an der Oder and then, from 1748 to 1750, at Leiden. At Frankfurt his teacher was Paul Ernst Jablonski, Daniel Ernst Jablonski's son and a great-grandson of Comenius. Jablonski, an Egyptologist and a pupil of Mathurin Veyssière de La Croze, introduced Woide to Coptic. As a student Woide copied every Coptic manuscript that La Croze and Jablonski owned, in the original or in copy. At Leiden he transcribed La Croze's manuscript Coptic lexicon. He also corresponded with the Berlin court preacher Christian Scholtz, whom he later called his master in Coptic.

== Ministry in Leszno ==
Woide returned to Leszno in 1750. In December of that year he became subrector (third master) of the Reformed gymnasium. On 24 October 1751 he was installed as chaplain (second minister) of the congregation, and on 9 March 1760 he was elected its pastor, although he was the youngest of the three candidates. He compiled a register of all the clergy of the Unity, Ministri Unitatis, which is held in the congregation's archive.

His years as pastor coincided with the Seven Years' War and with financial difficulties for the congregation. They were also marked by conflict with his colleague Samuel Ernst Musonius (1728–1793), who was elected chaplain in 1760. In April 1765 Musonius accused Woide of laxity in church discipline before the presbytery, which examined the charge and cleared him.

== Mission to England ==
Soon after April 1765 Woide went to England on a commission from the seniors of the Unity. Its stated purpose was to raise a collection among English Protestants. According to Bickerich, who draws on the records of the German Reformed congregation in London, Woide was in fact also acting as envoy of the Polish dissident nobility associated with the Confederation of Thorn, to seek British support for Protestants in Poland. He is reported to have presented a memorandum on the situation of the dissidents to the Prime Minister, Lord North.

Letters to Leszno dated November 1765 and February 1766 show that he was already in London. The salary from his congregation and the support promised by his noble patrons both stopped, so he looked for a post in London, and his wife joined him there in May 1769. He did not formally resign his Leszno pastorate for about another decade. His successor there was elected in July 1778, after letters from Woide asking to be released had been read to the congregation. Six of his children died young. A memorial tablet to them, which he ordered from England in 1769, is set into the outer wall of the Reformed church in Leszno.

== Life in London & Scholarly Networks ==
Woide acted as an intermediary between German and English scholarship. His 55 surviving letters to Johann David Michaelis (1772–1790), now at the Göttingen State and University Library, show him promoting German oriental and theological work in England, gathering subscriptions and arranging translations. He also put Michaelis in touch with English bishops and statesmen. His correspondents ranged from Zurich to Stockholm and from Madrid to St Petersburg. Besides Coptic, he wrote on Samaritan and Phoenician coins. He was a close friend of the naturalist Johann Reinhold Forster. They first corresponded while Woide was in Leszno, when Forster was pastor at Nassenhuben near Danzig and borrowed Woide's copy of La Croze's lexicon.

In February 1768 the German Reformed congregation in the Savoy appointed Woide its second minister and resolved to build its own church. The church was completed, and its building debt was repaid by 1776. Woide later became the congregation's first, and then its sole, pastor. In 1772, while both pastorates were vacant, he also served the Dutch Chapel Royal at St James's Palace for about a year.

He later become a librarian at the British Museum, first in the Department of Natural History, then in the Department of Printed Books, in charge of its Oriental manuscripts. He was one of the first scholars to work on the Egyptian Sahidic texts. He examined the Codex Alexandrinus and the published text of the New Testament from this codex in 1786. He was elected a fellow of the Royal Society in 1785, created D.C.L. by the University of Oxford in 1786, and appointed a fellow of many foreign societies.

Woide possessed some leaves of a Greek-Coptic diglot manuscript of the New Testament known as the Fragmentum Woideanum. These cover a portion of the Book of Luke. Woide suggested that the fragment was created in the 7th century. The leaves belong to Uncial 070 and other leaves of this manuscript are kept in different locations. According to Bickerich, the fragment contains Luke 12:15–13:32 and John 8:33–42.

== Personal Life and Death ==
Woide was described in 1782 by C. P. Moritz as living "not far from Paddington, in a very salubrious quarter on the edge of the town, where he breathes cleaner and fresher air than in the city. Although well known as a learned authority on Oriental languages, he is nevertheless a sociable and not unworldly man."

Woide suffered a stroke while at a party given at the house of Sir Joseph Banks, and later died in his rooms at the British Museum. After his death, Henry Ford edited material from Woide's papers, including his copy of the Codex Vaticanus collation (1799). Woide is reported to have bequeathed his handwritten transcript of the Codex Alexandrinus to the University of Kraków. An oil portrait of him belonged to the German Reformed St Paul's Church in London. A stipple engraving by Francesco Bartolozzi was published in 1791.

Woide's papers and diaries are held at the British Library. The Fragmentum Woideanum is kept at the Clarendon Press in Oxford.

== Works ==
- Lexicon Ægyptiaco-Latinum, 1775.
- Grammatica aegyptiaca utriusque dialecti (1778)
- Novum Testamentum Graecum e codice ms. alexandrino, London 1786.
- Appendix ad editionem Novi Testamenti graeci… in qua continentur fragmenta Novi Testamenti juxta interpretationem dialecti superioris Aegypti quae thebaica vel sahidica appellatur, Oxford 1799.
